= Stanwood =

Stanwood may refer to:

== People ==
- Stanwood Baumgartner (1894–1955), American Major League Baseball pitcher and sportswriter
- Stanwood Cobb (1881–1982), American educator, author and prominent Baháʼí member
- Stanwood Duval (born 1942), United States District Judge
- Cordelia Stanwood (1865–1958), American ornithologist and wildlife photographer
- Franklin Stanwood (1852–1888), American artist

== Places ==
- Stanwood, Ontario, Canada

=== United States ===
- Stanwood, Iowa
- Stanwood, Michigan
- Stanwood, Washington
  - Stanwood-Camano School District
  - Stanwood High School
  - Stanwood IOOF Public Hall
  - Stanwood station

== Other uses ==
- Stanwood (automobile)
- SS Stanwood, British collier
