= Stanwood, Washington =

Stanwood
- City
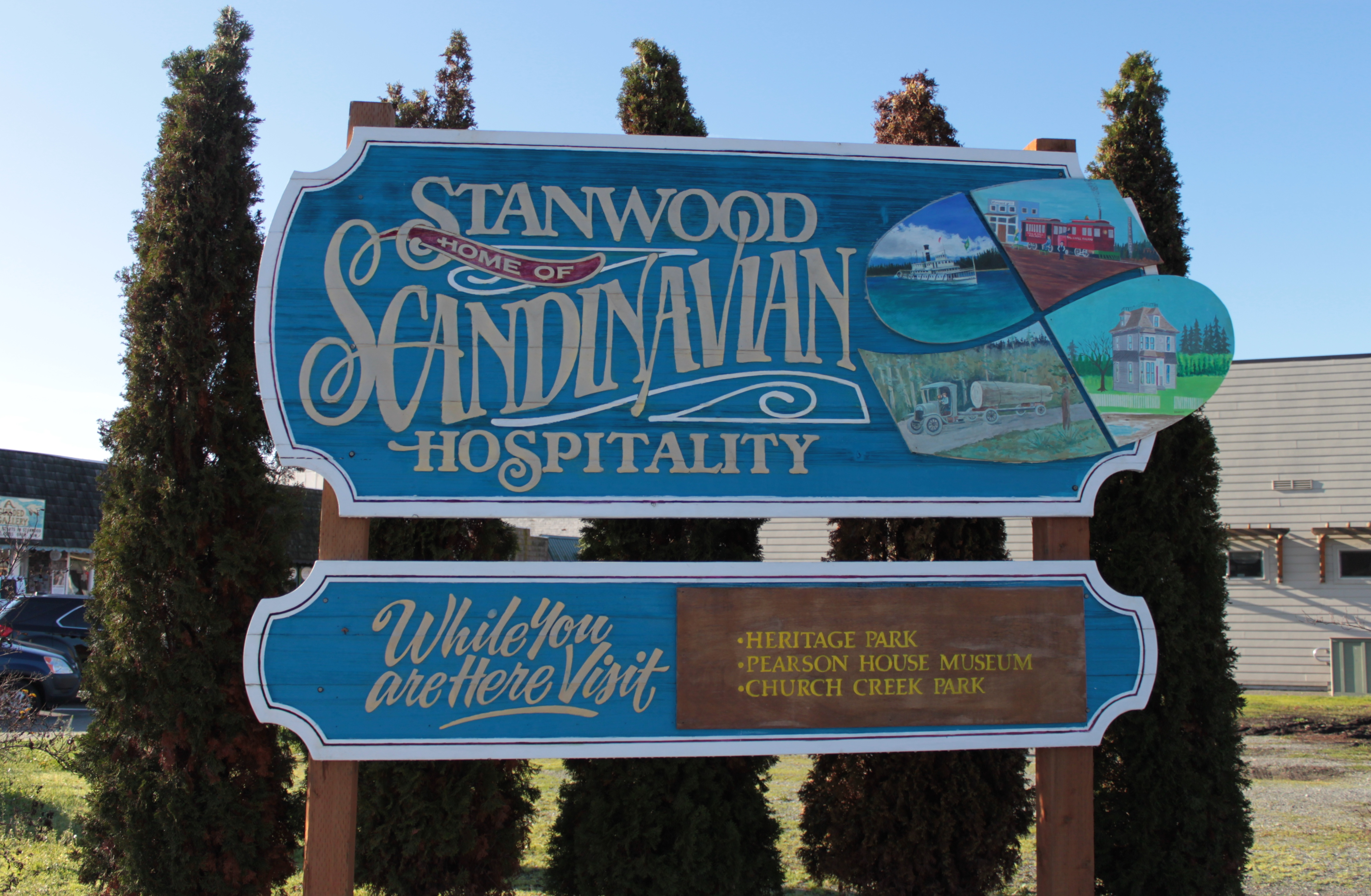
- Welcome sign in eastern Stanwood

- Seal
- Nickname: Twin City
- Interactive map of Stanwood
- Coordinates: 48°14′32″N 122°21′4″W
- Country: United States
- State: Washington
- County: Snohomish
- Incorporated: October 19, 1903
- Named for: Clara Stanwood Pearson

Government
  - Type: Mayor–council
  - Mayor: Sid Roberts

Area
  - Total: 2.94 sq mi (7.62 km^{2})
  - Land: 2.93 sq mi (7.59 km^{2})
  - Water: 0.012 sq mi (0.03 km^{2})
- Elevation: 6.6 ft (2 m)

Population (2020)
  - Total: 7,705
  - Estimate (2022): 8,804
  - Density: 2,629.2/sq mi (1,015.15/km^{2})
- Time zone: UTC-8 (Pacific (PST))
  - Summer (DST): UTC-7 (PDT)
- ZIP Code: 98292
- Area code: 360, 564
- FIPS code: 53-67455
- GNIS feature ID: 1512690
- Website: stanwoodwa.org

Stanwood is a city in Snohomish County, Washington, United States. The city is located 50 miles (80 km) north of Seattle, at the mouth of the Stillaguamish River near Camano Island. As of the 2020 census, its population is 7,705.

The Stanwood area has been home to the Stillaguamish people for thousands of years, who originally had a village at the present site of Stanwood. The modern city of Stanwood was later founded in 1866 as Centerville, adopting its current name in 1877 after the arrival of postmaster Daniel O. Pearson. It was platted in 1888 and incorporated as a city in 1903. The city was bypassed by the Great Northern Railway, which built a depot one mile (1.6 km) east that grew into its own separate town, incorporated in 1922 as East Stanwood. The two Stanwoods were civic rivals for several decades, until their governments were consolidated after a 1960 referendum was approved by voters.

The city was historically home to several food processing plants, which were its largest employers, and was mainly populated by Scandinavians. Since the 1990s, Stanwood has grown into a bedroom community for Seattle and Everett and has annexed uphill areas that were developed into suburban subdivisions. Stanwood is primarily served by State Route 532, which connects Camano Island to Interstate 5, and also has a train station that opened in 2009.

== History ==
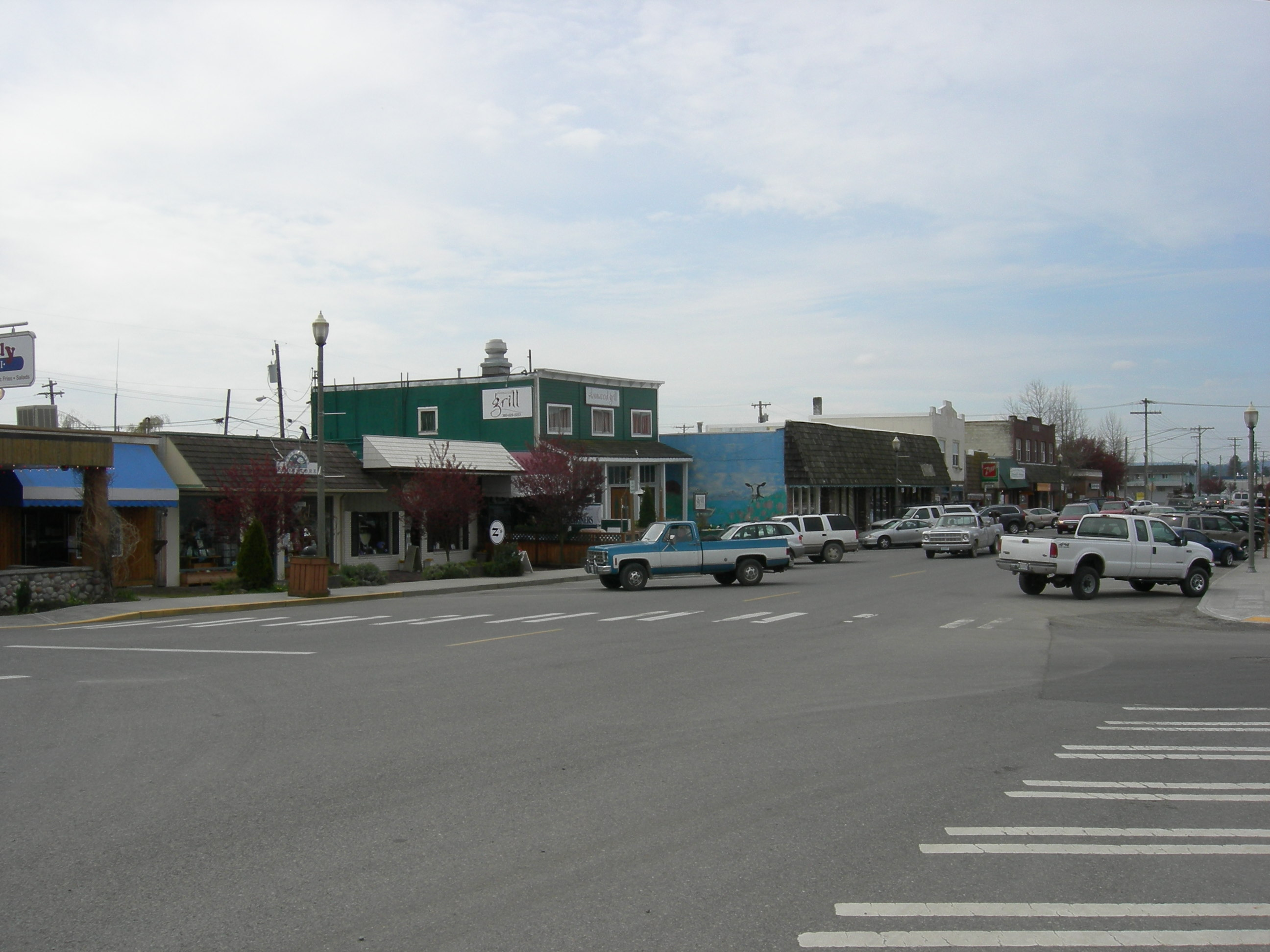
Looking west on 271st Street Northwest, formerly the main street of East Stanwood

The Stillaguamish, a Coast Salish tribe, have inhabited the area around the Stillaguamish River delta for several thousand years. At the time of the Point Elliott Treaty in 1855 there was a Stillaguamish village at the mouth of the river consisting of three large potlatch houses with an estimated population of 250 people. There were several other villages around the delta that totaled approximately 800 people, as well as graveyards that were later destroyed by settlers. The area at the mouth of the river is known as sdᶻəlgʷas, meaning strait or slough in Lushootseed.

The area's first American expedition was led by George O. and G. L. Wilson, who were led by Snohomish guides on a canoe expedition up the Stillaguamish River in 1851 and reported on its economic potential. The first permanent American settlement at the mouth of the Stillaguamish River was Centerville, a trading post established in 1866 by Robert Fulton on the south side of the river. Centerville gained a post office in 1870, and the settlement was moved to the north side of the river three years later. The post office was renamed to Stanwood in 1877 by its sixth postmaster Daniel O. Pearson, after his wife Clara's maiden name; Pearson also ran a general store and built a new steamboat wharf on the Stillaguamish River shortly after arriving. Pearson had arrived from Lowell, Massachusetts, in 1866; two of his sisters were among the original "Mercer Girls".

The surrounding area was cleared by loggers and managed using a series of levees along the Stillaguamish River before being opened for settlement by farmers and ranchers. The establishment of a Norwegian Lutheran church in 1876, the first to be built in the Pacific Northwest, brought the area's first wave of Scandinavian immigrants. The townsite's plat was filed by W. R. Stockbridge in 1888, ahead of a failed attempt to petition the county commission for incorporation as a city. Stanwood suffered from a major fire on June 2, 1892, which destroyed the church and thirteen buildings and caused damages of approximately $26,100 (equivalent to $813,000 in 2024 dollars); several businesses and the town's liquor supply were saved by volunteers from the town's Good Templars lodge, who had been at a regular meeting. By the end of the decade, the town had rebuilt its main street and gained a weekly newspaper, cannery, horse racing track, creamery, and a shingle mill. Stanwood was officially incorporated on October 19, 1903, a month after the town's men voted 74–16 in favor of becoming a city. Stanwood's businesses relocated a block away from the riverfront in the 1920s and 1930s after the main flow of the Stillaguamish River shifted to another slough. The change in the river rendered the wharf too shallow for steamboats and damaged dikes after several major floods.

The Seattle and Montana Railroad (later absorbed into the Great Northern Railway) was constructed through the Stanwood area in 1891, but bypassed the town one mile (1.6 km) to the east, where it built a depot on ground that was less prone to flooding. Several businesses relocated to the area around the depot, including a bank and Washington state's first cooperative general store. Merchants in the old town boycotted the railroad and acquired a steamboat, the City of Stanwood, in 1893; the ship was lost after catching fire on Port Susan the following year.

A short railroad, known as the Hall and Hall Railway, was constructed in 1904 between the depot and downtown Stanwood and would operate until 1938. The community around the depot was platted in 1906 as "East Stanwood", but initially relied on a commercial club to govern in lieu of a formal town government. East Stanwood was incorporated on February 7, 1922, after a series of civic disputes highlighted the need for a city government. East Stanwood was eventually bisected by the Pacific Highway in the 1920s and connected to Stanwood and Camano Island by paved roads constructed a decade earlier.

The "Twin City" maintained separate government facilities, schools, banks, sawmills, creameries, and frozen food plants. The school systems for the two cities were merged in 1944, ending a decades-long football rivalry between the two high schools. By the early 1950s, the competitiveness between merchants and citizens of both Stanwoods had softened and groups cooperated on events and various initiatives. A formal merger of the two cities was proposed in 1954 and placed on the April 30 ballot; Stanwood voted in favor of the merger, but it failed to reach a majority in East Stanwood. The high cost of a modern sewage treatment system, required by the state government before further expansion could occur, spurred leaders in both cities to place a second consolidation referendum before voters on March 8, 1960. The referendum was passed by an overwhelming majority of voters in both cities and the merged government immediately approved a $520,000 sewer installation contract.

Development of a new suburban commercial center east of the city began in the 1980s, centered around the relocated Stanwood High School campus. A 55-acre (22 ha) farm at the intersection of State Route 532 and 72nd Avenue Northwest was redeveloped into a $50 million shopping and entertainment center. The commercial center opened in 1995 and has 50 businesses, 10 restaurants, office buildings, a movie theater, and an arcade. The development was later expanded to include multi-story condominiums and upscale apartments with ground-floor retail space. The area surrounding the center was developed into suburban subdivisions, contributing to a doubling of the city's population to nearly 4,000 people by 2000. The subdivisions were annexed by the city government in the early 2000s, despite testimony from citizens against further growth. In 2005, the city rejected a bid by Wal-Mart to build a store in Stanwood after public outcry from supporters of downtown businesses.

The high school campus was replaced with a new building in 2021 that cost $147.5 million to construct. An adjacent 22-acre (8.9 ha) site is planned to be developed into a large residential complex with 444 apartments and 72 townhomes. The complex is also planned to incorporate retail, amenity spaces, and expanded wetlands.

== Geography ==
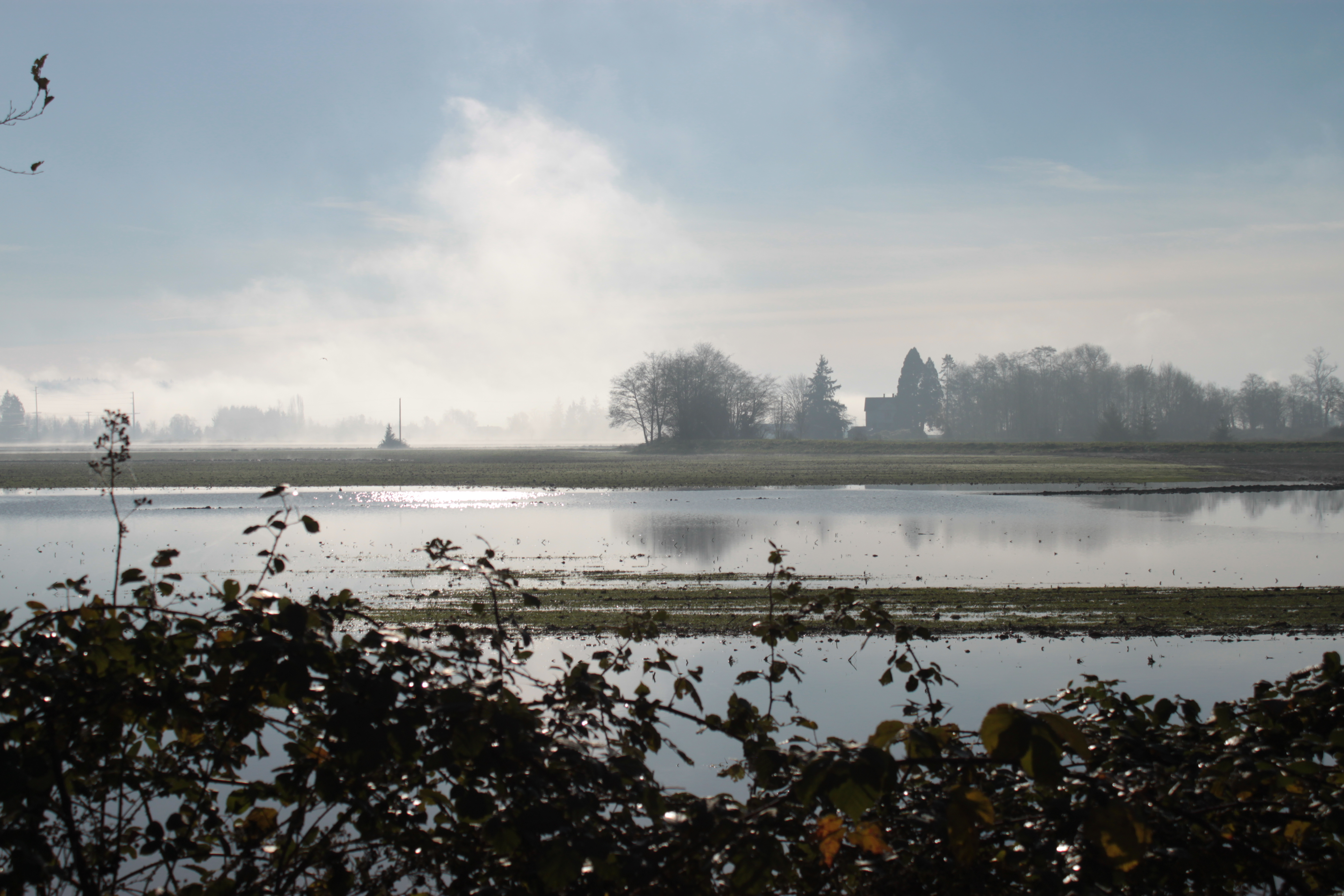
A section of the Stillaguamish River delta south of downtown Stanwood during a flood in 2015

According to the United States Census Bureau, the city of Stanwood has a total area of 2.84 square miles (7.36 km^{2}), of which 2.82 square miles (7.30 km^{2}) is land and 0.02 square miles (0.05 km^{2}) is water. The city is at the northwestern corner of Snohomish County, and is considered part of the Seattle metropolitan area. It is 13 miles (21 km) west of its nearest neighboring town, Arlington, and 20 miles (32 km) north of Everett, the county seat. The city is also 50 miles (80 km) north of Seattle and 17 miles (27 km) south of Mount Vernon.

Stanwood's city limits are generally defined to the south by the Stillaguamish River; to the west by 104th Drive Northwest; to the north by 276th Street Northwest and 290th Street Northwest; and to the east by 68th Avenue Northwest. Approximately 59 percent of land within Stanwood city limits is used for housing, while 10 percent is zoned for commercial use and 7 percent for industrial uses. The urban growth area of Stanwood consists of an additional 425 acres (172 ha) outside city limits, including the unincorporated area of Northwest Stanwood.

The city is located at the mouth of the Stillaguamish River, where it flows into Port Susan, an arm of the Puget Sound, and Skagit Bay, the mouth of the Skagit River. To the west is Davis Slough, which separates Stanwood from Camano Island and forms the border between Snohomish and Island counties. Elevations in Stanwood range from 2 feet (0.61 m) above sea level near the Stillaguamish River to 190 feet (58 m) in the northeastern hills. The city is home to five creeks and drainage basins that flow into the Stillaguamish River and Puget Sound: Church Creek, Douglas Creek, Irvine Slough, the Skagit River, and the Stillaguamish River. The Stanwood area was formed during the Pleistocene glaciation and was further shaped through the rise and fall of the sea level as well as sedimentary deposits from the Skagit and Stillaguamish rivers.

Much of downtown Stanwood is located in a 100-year flood zone and is at risk of flooding from the Stillaguamish River, as well as the Skagit River. Much of the Stillaguamish delta was reclaimed using a series of levees and dikes that were built in the 1870s and improved by the Works Progress Administration in the 1930s and the city government in the 1990s. Some of the failure-prone dikes were later removed in the 2010s and 2020s to restore habitat areas for native wildlife, including a 230-acre (93 ha) wetland owned by the Stillaguamish Tribe of Indians. Several civic buildings have also been relocated uphill from the downtown area to prevent floods from hampering the city's vital functions. In 2020, the city government began construction of flood controls to redirect stormwater into the Stillaguamish River rather than the sloughs to prevent flooding. The project is expected to cost $11 million and take 10 years to complete over six phases. A deployable flood barrier at Marine Drive is scheduled to be completed in 2025 and is planned to be supplemented by a new pump and another gate over the BNSF Railway tracks.

== Economy ==
As of 2015, Stanwood has an estimated workforce population of 4,644 and an unemployment rate of 4.1 percent. The most common occupations for Stanwood residents are in the education and health care sector, which employs 24.1 percent, followed by manufacturing (17.5%), retail (13.3%), and entertainment and food services (11.2%). Only 14 percent of employed residents work within Stanwood city limits, while the rest commute to other cities for work. The most common commuting destinations for Stanwood residents include Everett, with 15 percent of traffic, Seattle (8.5%), Mount Vernon (5%), Arlington (4.6%), and Marysville (4.5%). The average one-way commute for the city's workers was approximately 27.5 minutes; 83.5 percent of commuters drove alone to their workplace, while 7.4 percent carpooled and 2.8 percent used public transit.

The city's largest employers are the Stanwood-Camano School District and the Josephine Sunset Home, which provide approximately 550 and 303 jobs, respectively. One of the city's other large employers was the Twin City Foods frozen food processing plant, which packaged frozen vegetables and fruits until it ceased operations in 2017. The original plant was destroyed in an accidental fire on April 28, 1996, causing $50 million in damage and leaving 111 full-time workers unemployed until a new plant opened the following July.

== Demographics ==
Historical population
| Census | Pop. | Note | %± |
|---|---|---|---|
| 1910 | 544 | | — |
| 1920 | 704 | | 29.4% |
| 1930 | 715 | | 1.6% |
| 1940 | 600 | | −16.1% |
| 1950 | 710 | | 18.3% |
| 1960 | 646 | | −9.0% |
| 1970 | 1,347 | | 108.5% |
| 1980 | 1,646 | | 22.2% |
| 1990 | 1,961 | | 19.1% |
| 2000 | 3,923 | | 100.1% |
| 2010 | 6,231 | | 58.8% |
| 2020 | 7,705 | | 23.7% |
| 2022 (est.) | 8,804 | | 14.3% |
U.S. Decennial Census

Stanwood is among the smallest cities in Snohomish County by population. By 2035, the city and its surrounding urban growth area are expected to have a population of 11,085. The greater Stanwood area, which includes Camano Island and other nearby communities, has a total population of 33,000 people.

Stanwood was noted for its historically large Scandinavian population, particularly Norwegians, who settled in the region in the early 20th century. As late as 1949, over 60 percent of Stanwood residents were of Norwegian, Swedish, or Danish descent. By 2000, however, only 17.6 percent of residents identified themselves as having Scandinavian ancestry.

=== 2020 census ===
As of the 2020 census, there were 7,705 people and 2,789 households living in Stanwood, which had a population density of 2,628.8 inhabitants per square mile (1,015.0/km^{2}). There were 2,979 total housing units, of which 93.6% were occupied and 6.4% were vacant or for occasional use. The racial makeup of the city was 82.5% White, 1.1% Native American and Alaskan Native, 1.1% Black or African American, 2.1% Asian, and 0.5% Native Hawaiian and Pacific Islander. Residents who listed another race were 3.7% of the population and those who identified as more than one race were 9.0% of the population. Hispanic or Latino residents of any race were 8.7% of the population.

Of the 2,789 households in Stanwood, 50.8% were married couples living together and 7.3% were cohabitating but unmarried. Households with a male householder with no spouse or partner were 14.5% of the population, while households with a female householder with no spouse or partner were 27.4% of the population. Out of all households, 38.4% had children under the age of 18 living with them and 30.2% had residents who were 65 years of age or older. There were 2,789 occupied housing units in Stanwood, of which 67.6% were owner-occupied and 32.4% were occupied by renters.

The median age in the city was 36.9 years old for all sexes, 34.8 years old for males, and 38.9 years old for females. Of the total population, 29.4% of residents were under the age of 19; 25.2% were between the ages of 20 and 39; 28.4% were between the ages of 40 and 64; and 17.1% were 65 years of age or older. The gender makeup of the city was 47.4% male and 52.6% female.

=== 2010 census ===
As of the 2010 census, there were 6,231 people, 2,388 households, and 1,541 families residing in the city. The population density was 2,209.6 inhabitants per square mile (853.1/km^{2}). There were 2,584 housing units at an average density of 916.3 per square mile (353.8/km^{2}). The racial makeup of the city was 89.7% White, 1.0% African American, 0.8% Native American, 1.7% Asian, 0.3% Pacific Islander, 2.6% from other races, and 3.9% from two or more races. Hispanic or Latino persons of any race were 7.0% of the population.

There were 2,388 households, of which 38.0% had children under the age of 18 living with them, 47.7% were married couples living together, 12.1% had a female householder with no husband present, 4.7% had a male householder with no wife present, and 35.5% were non-families. 29.6% of all households were made up of individuals, and 16.2% had someone living alone who was 65 years of age or older. The average household size was 2.55 and the average family size was 3.18.

The median age in the city was 35.9 years. 28.1% of residents were under the age of 18; 8% were between the ages of 18 and 24; 27.2% were from 25 to 44; 21.3% were from 45 to 64; and 15.3% were 65 years of age or older. The gender makeup of the city was 47.3% male and 52.7% female.

== Government and politics ==
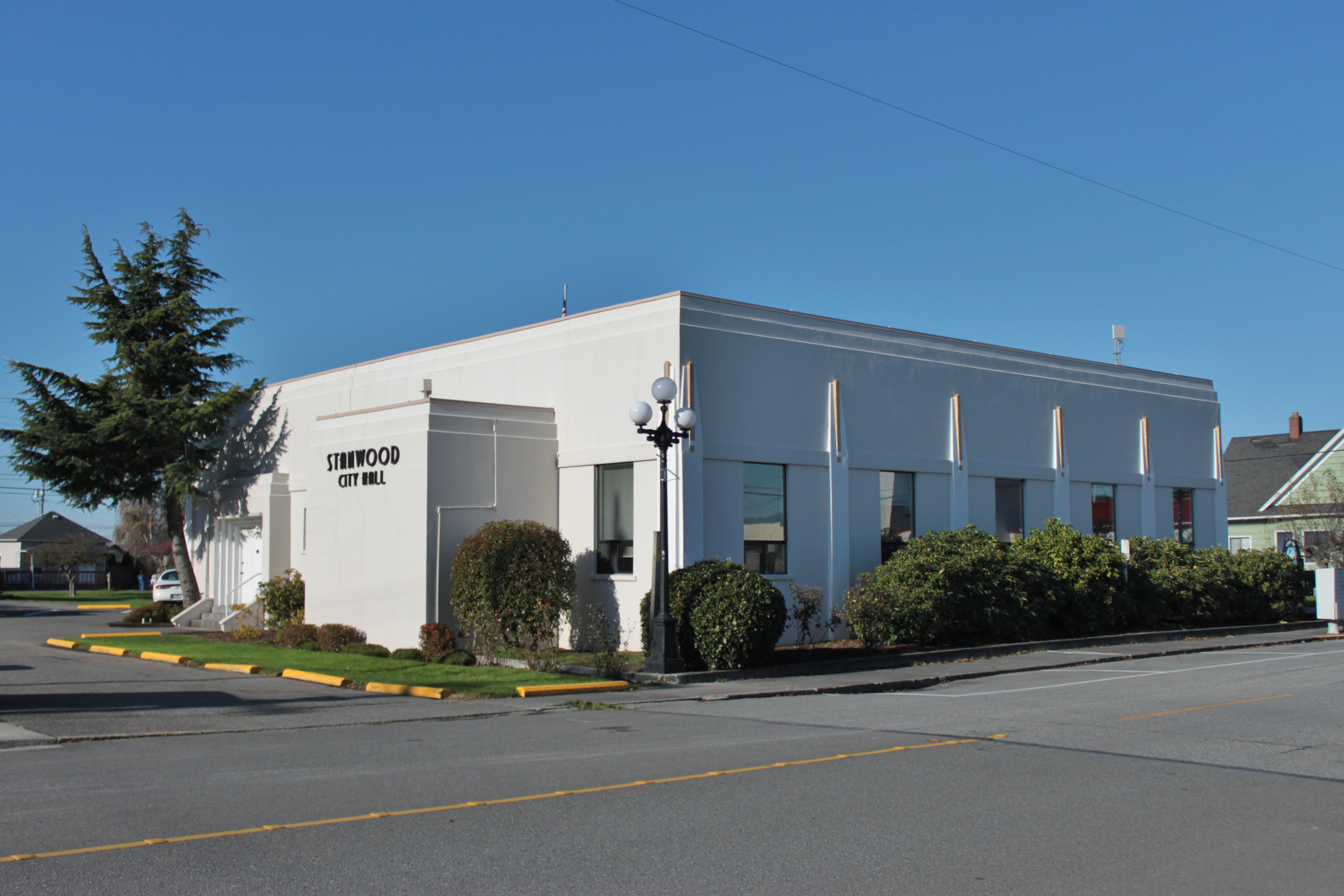
Stanwood's city hall, built in 1939

Stanwood is a non-charter code city that operates under a mayor–council government. The city council's seven members and the mayor are elected to four-year terms in non-partisan elections. City councilmember Sid Roberts was elected mayor in 2021, replacing interim mayor Elizabeth Callaghan. The council conducts regular meetings twice per month at the Stanwood-Camano School District administrative offices. The city hall was built in 1939 and renovated in the 1960s and 2013, but remains too small to host city council meetings. The city has long-term plans to relocate the city hall out of the downtown flood zone to a property near Church Creek Park.

The city government employs 28 people full-time and operates on a biennial budget with annual expenses of $16.2 million. The budget funds various departments run by the government, including water utilities, parks and recreation, development planning, and clerks. Stanwood also outsources its policing services to the county sheriff's office and its fire and emergency services to the North County Regional Fire Authority. The sheriff's office provides several deputies and officers, while the vehicles and uniforms are marked with the city logo.

At the federal level, Stanwood is part of the 2nd congressional district, which is represented by Democrat Rick Larsen. At the state level, Stanwood is part of the 10th legislative district along with Arlington, southwestern Skagit County, and the entirety of Island County. Stanwood is wholly part of the Snohomish County Council's 1st district, which covers northern areas of the county.

== Culture ==
=== Arts and events ===
Stanwood's arts community is centered around the Stanwood–Camano Arts Guild, which organizes an annual spring art show and the Art by the Bay festival in the summer. The guild also programs public art at local businesses and public venues. Stanwood is also a center for glass artwork due to its proximity to the Pilchuck Glass School, founded in 1971 by a group of glassblowing artists led by Dale Chihuly.

Stanwood also hosts several annual festivals and events that are organized by community groups and the city government. In February, the area hosts a glass treasure hunt and a birding festival to coincide with the migration of snow geese and other winter flocks. During the summer months, the city organizes weekend concerts at various venues around downtown and hosts a farmers' market on Fridays from June to October. Stanwood's two late summer festivals, the Community Fair and Harvest Jubilee, are focused around the region's agricultural tradition. The Community Fair, held since 1932 in early August and billed as the "Best Lil' Fair in the West", draws 12,000 visitors annually and features 4-H presentations, livestock exhibitions, a parade, and carnival rides. The Harvest Jubilee, held since 2007 in late September, includes fine art exhibitions, produce contests, and self-guided tours of local farms.

=== Parks and recreation ===
Stanwood has eight public parks that have a combined 86 acres (35 ha) of public open and preserved space. The parks range from nature sanctuaries to neighborhood parks, playgrounds, sports fields, and boat launches. The city's largest park is Heritage Park, located in downtown and covering 44 acres (18 ha); it is shared with the school district and includes sports fields, walking trails, picnic areas, a dog park, and a skate park. Stanwood's nearest regional parks are Kayak Point County Park, which also includes an adjacent golf course, and Wenberg County Park on Lake Goodwin.

In 2014, the city began development of new multi-million dollar parks at the former Hamilton lumber mill and Ovenell dairy farm, both located along the Stillaguamish River near downtown. The Hamilton site includes an iconic smokestack that is decorated during the holiday season and will be incorporated into the new park, which will include a boat launch and public dock. The 15-acre (6.1 ha) Ovenell site was cleared of its historic barn in 2017 and will include a boat launch, natural habitats, and a demonstration farm when fully completed in the 2020s.

=== Media ===
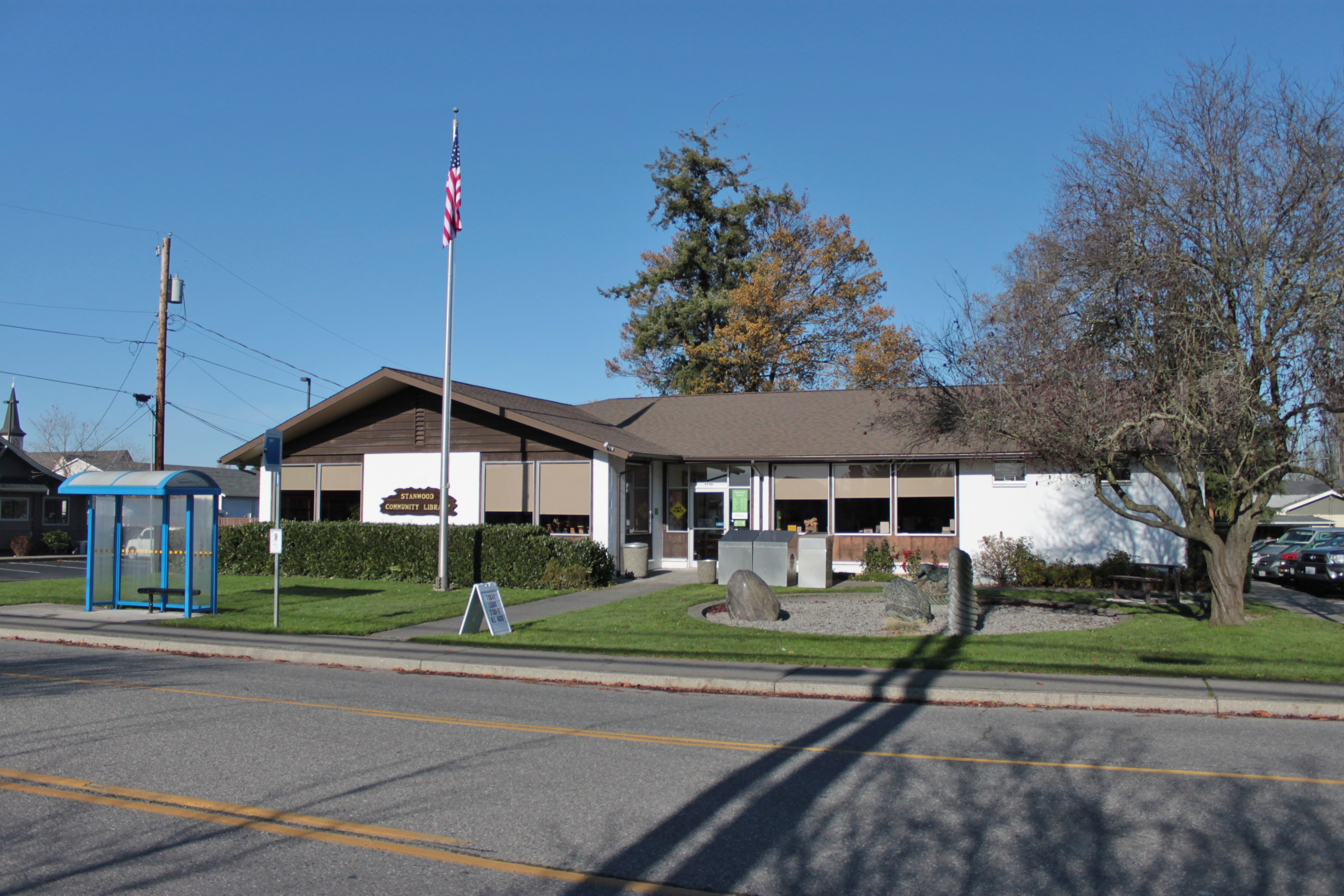
The Stanwood Community Library, operated by the Sno-Isle Libraries system

Stanwood has one weekly newspaper, the Stanwood Camano News, which originated in 1903 as the Stanwood Tidings and later ran under the name of the Twin City News. The newspaper was acquired by the Pioneer News Group, publishers of the Mount Vernon-based Skagit Valley Herald, in 2015. At the time, the News had a weekly circulation of 2,200.

Stanwood's public library is operated by the countywide Sno-Isle Libraries system and is housed in a 5,400-square-foot (500 m^{2}) building. The city's first library was built in 1922 and replaced in 1970 with the modern building, which was expanded in 1986.

=== Historic buildings ===
The twin downtowns of Stanwood and East Stanwood have several blocks of historic buildings that date back to the early 20th century and were preserved by the city's residents. A portion of the eastern downtown was nearly destroyed in a two-alarm fire on August 27, 1997, which burned through three shops.

Stanwood has two buildings listed on the National Register of Historic Places (NRHP), which evaluates historic sites under private ownership. The D. O. Pearson House, was built in 1890 as the home of the founding Pearson family and was listed in 1973. It was acquired by the Stanwood Area Historical Society in 1975 and now serves as a pioneer museum. The city's other NRHP listing, the three-story Stanwood IOOF Public Hall, was built in 1903 for use by various fraternal organizations (including the International Order of Odd Fellows) until it was acquired by the historical society in 1996. The IOOF building was reopened in 2003 as the Floyd Norgaard Cultural Center and now serves as a museum, community center, and events venue.

=== Notable people ===
- Nels Bruseth, forest ranger, painter, and naturalist
- Bundle of Hiss, grunge band
- Fanny Cory, cartoonist and illustrator
- Sarah Jones, Olympic rower
- T. J. Oshie, professional hockey player
- Eugene H. Peterson, clergyman and author
- Ted Richards, American football player
- Zakarias Martin Toftezen, first Norwegian settler on the Puget Sound
- Zoë Marieh Urness, photographer
- Francesca Woodman, photographer

== Education ==
Public schools in Stanwood are operated by the Stanwood-Camano School District, which covers the city and neighboring communities, including Camano Island, Lake Ketchum, and Warm Beach. The district had an enrollment of approximately 4,554 students in 2014 and has eleven total schools, including one comprehensive high school. The old high school, opened in 1971, was replaced in 2021 by a new, three-story building on the existing campus to accommodate the area's growing population.

The zoned elementary schools in Stanwood, which each take a piece of the city in their attendance zones, are Cedarhome, Stanwood, and Twin City. There is a portion of the city that is in an exclave of the attendance zone of Utsalady Elementary School in Camano. The city is divided between two zoned middle schools, both in Stanwood: Port Susan and Stanwood Middle. The Stanwood-Camano district's sole comprehensive high school is Stanwood High School. The district operates alternative middle and high schools (Lincoln Academy and Lincoln Hill High), as well as a homeschool partnership program, Saratoga School, all based in Stanwood.

Stanwood's nearest post-secondary education institutions are Skagit Valley College, located in Mount Vernon, and Everett Community College, located in northern Everett. In 2006, the city offered 480 acres (190 ha) near Interstate 5 to the state government for a potential four-year university campus. The university project was eventually awarded to other bids in Everett before being cancelled entirely in 2008.

== Infrastructure ==
=== Transportation ===
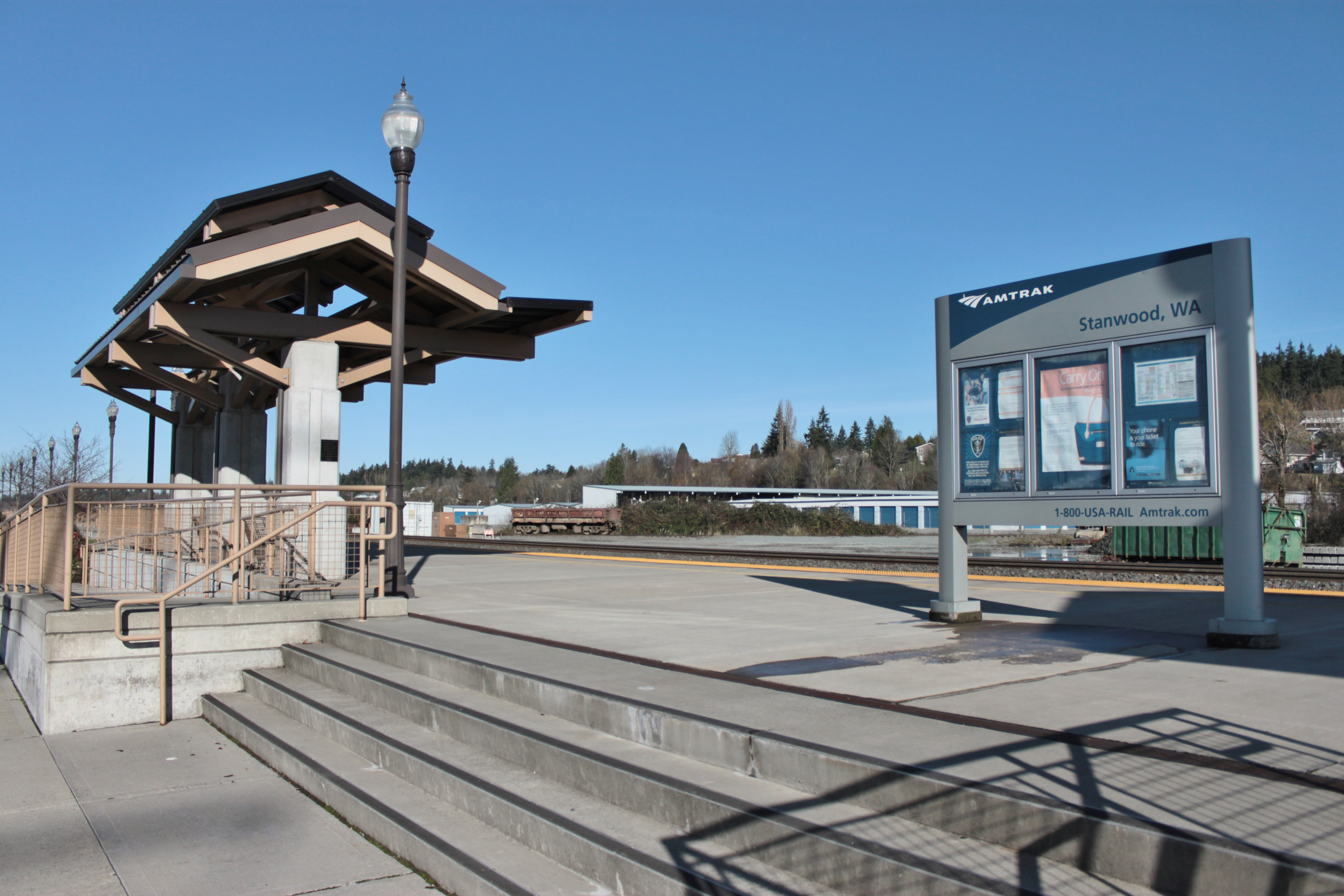
Stanwood's Amtrak station, opened in 2009 and served by Cascades

Stanwood is located on State Route 532, an east–west highway connecting Camano Island to Interstate 5 east of Stanwood. The city is also served by two other major highways: Pioneer Highway, historically part of State Route 530 and the Pacific Highway (U.S. Route 99), which continues north to Conway and east towards Silvana and Arlington; and Marine Drive, which continues south to Florence, Warm Beach, the Tulalip Indian Reservation, and Marysville. Due to significant traffic congestion on State Route 532, the city government studied a local bypass route on the west side of Stanwood in 2021.

Public transportation in Stanwood is provided by Community Transit and Island Transit, the transit authorities of Snohomish and Island counties, respectively. Community Transit runs local bus service from Stanwood to Warm Beach, North Lakewood, and Smokey Point. On weekdays, it also runs express buses to Lynnwood City Center station, the northern terminus of the Link light rail system, and peak-only service to the Boeing Everett Factory from a park-and-ride near Interstate 5. Island Transit provides service to Camano Island on two routes, as well as commuter service to Mount Vernon and Everett. A separate service, named Snow Goose Transit, debuted in 2022 and provides minibus service in Stanwood and parts of Camano Island. It is operated by a local retirement home and was funded by the Washington State Department of Transportation.

Stanwood is served by a north–south railroad owned by BNSF Railway, which operates freight and passenger rail service to the city. Amtrak's Cascades provides daily passenger rail service at Stanwood station in downtown Stanwood, continuing south to Seattle and north to Vancouver, British Columbia. The train station opened on November 21, 2009, restoring passenger rail service that had been discontinued in 1971.

=== Utilities ===
Electric power in Stanwood is provided by the Snohomish County Public Utility District (PUD), a consumer-owned public utility that serves all of Snohomish County and neighboring Camano Island. Cascade Natural Gas provides natural gas service to the city's residents and businesses, as part of its service area in northwestern Washington. Stanwood has two major broadband internet providers: Frontier and Wave Broadband; the latter also offers cable television.

The city government provides water and water treatment to residents and businesses within a 10-square-mile (26 km^{2}) service area that includes the entire city and some surrounding unincorporated areas. The city's water supply is sourced primarily from several wells that draw from an underground aquifer. Wastewater and stormwater are collected and treated at two treatment plants, built in 1963 and 2004. Solid waste and recycling collection within Stanwood is contracted by the city government to Waste Management.

=== Health care ===
Stanwood's nearest general hospital is the Cascade Valley Hospital in Arlington. The city has two medical clinics operated by The Everett Clinic and Skagit Valley Hospital. The Stanwood General Hospital operated until 1943, and a replacement was planned in the late 1950s, but never built.
