= Kayak Point, Washington =

- CDP
- Location within Washington (state)
- Coordinates: 48°08′33″N 122°20′32″W
- Country: United States
- State: Washington
- County: Snohomish

Area
  - Total: 5.485 sq mi (14.21 km^{2})
  - Land: 5.474 sq mi (14.18 km^{2})
  - Water: 0.011 sq mi (0.028 km^{2})

Population (2013)
  - Total: 1,737
  - Density: 317.3/sq mi (122.5/km^{2})
- Time zone: Pacific
- ZIP Code: 98292
- Area code(s): 360, 564

Kayak Point is a census-designated place (CDP) located in Snohomish County, Washington, United States. The CDP was newly defined by the United States Census Bureau in 2013. As of the 2020 census, Kayak Point had a population of 1,883.

It is home to Kayak Point County Park as well as a golf course.

== Geography ==
Kayak Point is located at coordinates 48°08′33″N 122°20′32″W (48.142508, -122.342276).

According to the United States Census Bureau, the CDP has a total area of 5.485 square miles (14.2 km²), of which, 5.474 square miles (14.2 km²) is land and 0.011 square miles (0.03 km²) of it (0.20%) is water.

== Demographics ==
Historical population
Census	Pop.	Note	%±
2020	1,883		—
U.S. Decennial Census; 2010

Kayak Point first appeared as a census designated place in the 2020 U.S. census.

=== Racial and ethnic composition ===
Kayak Point CDP, Washington – Racial and ethnic composition Note: the US Census treats Hispanic/Latino as an ethnic category. This table excludes Latinos from the racial categories and assigns them to a separate category. Hispanics/Latinos may be of any race.
Race / Ethnicity (NH = Non-Hispanic)	Pop 2020	2020
White alone (NH)	1,582	84.01%
Black or African American alone (NH)	8	0.42%
Native American or Alaska Native alone (NH)	20	1.06%
Asian alone (NH)	37	1.96%
Native Hawaiian or Pacific Islander alone (NH)	4	0.21%
Other race alone (NH)	12	0.64%
Mixed race or Multiracial (NH)	114	6.05%
Hispanic or Latino (any race)	106	5.63%
Total	1,883	100.00%

=== 2020 census ===
As of the 2020 census, Kayak Point had a population of 1,883. The median age was 46.1 years. 18.3% of residents were under the age of 18 and 15.1% of residents were 65 years of age or older. For every 100 females there were 107.4 males, and for every 100 females age 18 and over there were 108.7 males age 18 and over.

0.0% of residents lived in urban areas, while 100.0% lived in rural areas.

There were 679 households in Kayak Point, of which 28.4% had children under the age of 18 living in them. Of all households, 76.6% were married-couple households, 9.3% were households with a male householder and no spouse or partner present, and 9.9% were households with a female householder and no spouse or partner present. About 8.3% of all households were made up of individuals and 3.5% had someone living alone who was 65 years of age or older.

There were 754 housing units, of which 9.9% were vacant. The homeowner vacancy rate was 1.8% and the rental vacancy rate was 0.0%.

Racial composition as of the 2020 census
Race	Number	Percent
White	1,610	85.5%
Black or African American	8	0.4%
American Indian and Alaska Native	25	1.3%
Asian	38	2.0%
Native Hawaiian and Other Pacific Islander	5	0.3%
Some other race	41	2.2%
Two or more races	156	8.3%

== Education ==
Most of it is in the Stanwood-Camano School District. An eastern part is in the Lakewood School District.

The zoned elementary school and middle school for the Stanwood-Camano area are Stanwood Elementary School and Port Susan Middle School. The Stanwood-Camano district's sole comprehensive high school is Stanwood High School.
