= Sunday Lake, Washington =

- CDP
- Location of Sunday Lake, Washington.
- Coordinates: 48°13′49″N 122°16′4″W
- Country: United States
- State: Washington
- County: Snohomish

Area
  - Total: 1.80 sq mi (4.65 km^{2})
  - Land: 1.73 sq mi (4.48 km^{2})
  - Water: 0.066 sq mi (0.17 km^{2})

Population (2010)
  - Total: 640
  - Density: 370/sq mi (142.8/km^{2})
- Time zone: UTC-8 (Pacific (PST))
  - Summer (DST): UTC-7 (PDT)
- GNIS feature ID: 2585044

Sunday Lake is a census-designated place (CDP) in Snohomish County, Washington, United States. As of the 2020 census, Sunday Lake had a population of 1,184.

== Geography ==
According to the United States Census Bureau, the CDP has a total area of 1.79 square miles (4.65 km^{2}), of which, 1.73 square miles (4.48 km^{2}) is land and 0.06 square miles (0.17 km^{2}; 3.57%) is water.

== Demographics ==
Historical population
Census	Pop.	Note	%±
2010	640		—
2020	1,184		85.0%
U.S. Decennial Census; 2000 2010

Sunday Lake first appeared as a census designated place in the 2010 U.S. census.

=== Racial and ethnic composition ===
Sunday Lake CDP, Washington – Racial and ethnic composition Note: the US Census treats Hispanic/Latino as an ethnic category. This table excludes Latinos from the racial categories and assigns them to a separate category. Hispanics/Latinos may be of any race.
Race / Ethnicity (NH = Non-Hispanic)	Pop 2010	Pop 2020	% 2010	% 2020
White alone (NH)	570	985	89.06%	83.19%
Black or African American alone (NH)	8	14	1.25%	1.18%
Native American or Alaska Native alone (NH)	6	5	0.94%	0.42%
Asian alone (NH)	10	26	1.56%	2.20%
Native Hawaiian or Pacific Islander alone (NH)	5	0	0.78%	0.00%
Other race alone (NH)	0	3	0.00%	0.25%
Mixed race or Multiracial (NH)	19	88	2.97%	7.43%
Hispanic or Latino (any race)	22	63	3.44%	5.32%
Total	640	1,184	100.00%	100.00%

== Education ==
The community is served by two public education systems: the Stanwood-Camano School District and the Arlington School District.

The zoned elementary school and middle school for the Stanwood-Camano area are Twin City Elementary School and Port Susan Middle School. The Stanwood-Camano district's sole comprehensive high school is Stanwood High School.
