= Stillaguamish =

Stillaguamish can refer to:

- Stillaguamish people, a Coast Salish people of Washington

- Stillaguamish Tribe of Indians of Washington, a federally recognized tribe

== Places ==
- Stillaguamish River
- Stillaguamish Reservation, Washington
