= Stanley Wood =

Stanley Wood may refer to:

- Stan Wood (footballer) (1905–1967), English footballer
- Stanley L. Wood (1866–1928), Victorian English illustrator
- Stan Wood (fossil hunter) (1939–2012)

== See also ==
- Stanwood (disambiguation)
