= Warm Beach, Washington =

Warm Beach, Washington dxʷtux̌ʷub
- CDP
- Location of Warm Beach, Washington
- Coordinates: 48°9′35″N 122°21′13″W
- Country: United States
- State: Washington
- County: Snohomish

Area
  - Total: 4.0 sq mi (10.4 km^{2})
  - Land: 3.9 sq mi (10.1 km^{2})
  - Water: 0.12 sq mi (0.3 km^{2})
- Elevation: 59 ft (18 m)

Population (2020)
  - Total: 2,990
  - Density: 767/sq mi (296/km^{2})
- Time zone: UTC-8 (Pacific (PST))
  - Summer (DST): UTC-7 (PDT)
- ZIP Code: 98292
- Area code(s): 360, 564
- FIPS code: 53-76195
- GNIS feature ID: 1512777

Warm Beach (Lushootseed: dxʷtux̌ʷub) is a census-designated place (CDP) in Snohomish County, Washington, United States. The population was 2,990 at the 2020 census.

== History ==
What is now Warm Beach was the site of a village of the Stillaguamish and Snohomish peoples. The village had one longhouse and several smaller cedar houses. According to James Dorsey, the chief of the Stillaguamish Tribe in 1927, it was a gathering place for members of the Stillaguamish and other neighboring tribes. In their language, Lushootseed, Warm Beach is called dxʷtux̌ʷub.

Seattle real estate developer Clarence Dayton Hillman acquired 12,000 acres (4,900 ha) along Port Susan in 1906 and began to sell property for a future seaport city named "Birmingham" for his Michigan hometown. By 1910, he had sold plots and ran an excursion steamer to the site, where paid actors were used to create the illusion of a thriving city. The scheme was later uncovered and Hillman was sentenced to 2.5 years in prison for mail fraud. A community at the site was established and renamed to Warm Beach in 1924.

A Christian summer camp was established at Warm Beach in 1956 by the Free Methodist Church and opened two years later. It hosts an annual Christmas lights festival in December that was inspired by the Opryland Themepark in Tennessee. The Free Methodist Church also operates a senior living center in Warm Beach that includes nursing home and assisted living units.

== Geography ==
According to the United States Census Bureau, the CDP has a total area of 4.0 square miles (10.4 km^{2}), of which, 3.9 square miles (10.1 km^{2}) of it is land and 0.1 square miles (0.3 km^{2}) of it (3.23%) is water.

== Demographics ==
Historical population
Census	Pop.	Note	%±
2000	2,040		—
2010	2,437		19.5%
2020	2,990		22.7%
U.S. Decennial Census; 1970 1980 1990; 2000 2010

Warm Beach first appeared as a census designated place in the 2000 U.S. census.

=== 2000 census ===
As of the census of 2000, there were 2,040 people, 768 households, and 595 families residing in the CDP. The population density was 523.1 people per square mile (202.0/km^{2}). There were 866 housing units at an average density of 222.1/sq mi (85.7/km^{2}). The racial makeup of the CDP was 95.74% White, 0.15% African American, 0.64% Native American, 0.69% Asian, 0.15% Pacific Islander, 0.64% from other races, and 2.01% from two or more races. Hispanic or Latino of any race were 1.52% of the population.

There were 768 households, out of which 33.3% had children under the age of 18 living with them, 68.8% were married couples living together, 5.9% had a female householder with no husband present, and 22.5% were non-families. 17.1% of all households were made up of individuals, and 5.9% had someone living alone who was 65 years of age or older. The average household size was 2.66 and the average family size was 2.97.

In the CDP, the age distribution of the population shows 25.1% under the age of 18, 6.0% from 18 to 24, 27.9% from 25 to 44, 26.7% from 45 to 64, and 14.3% who were 65 years of age or older. The median age was 40 years. For every 100 females, there were 99.6 males. For every 100 females age 18 and over, there were 98.6 males.

The median income for a household in the CDP was $51,420, and the median income for a family was $53,611. Males had a median income of $50,240 versus $28,482 for females. The per capita income for the CDP was $26,783. About 4.1% of families and 8.9% of the population were below the poverty line, including 23.1% of those under age 18 and none of those age 65 or over.

== Education ==
The community is served by the Stanwood-Camano School District.

The zoned elementary school and middle school for this area are Stanwood Elementary School and Port Susan Middle School. The district's sole comprehensive high school is Stanwood High School.

== Notable people ==
- Graham Kerr, former television chef
