= H and H Railroad =

Short railroad in Washington state, U.S.

H & H Railroad
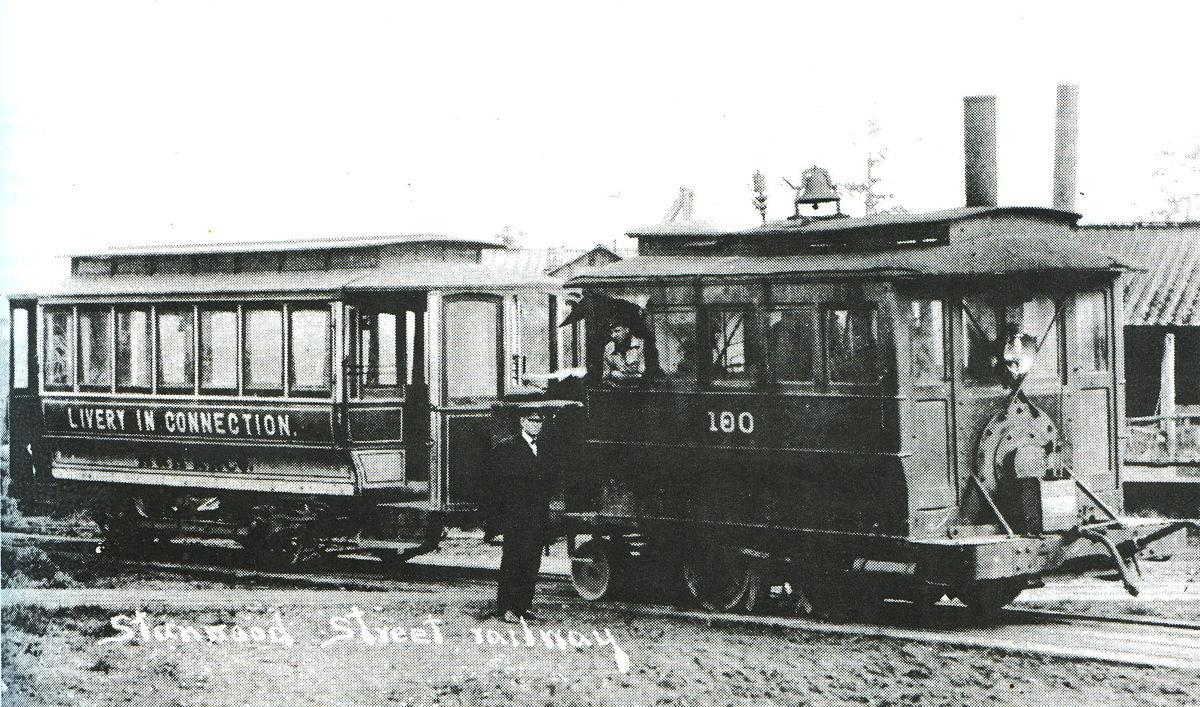
- Stanwood Street Railway – Livery in Connection

History
- Opened: October 25, 1904

Technical
- Line length: 1 mi (1.6 km)
- Track gauge: 4 ft 8 1/2 in (1,435 mm)

The H & H Railroad, also known as Hall & Hall, Stanwood Street Railway or colloquially Dinky, was a short street railway in Snohomish County, Washington, United States. It ran over a 1 mile (1.6 km) long track from East Stanwood to Stanwood in the early 20th century. It was proclaimed "the shortest railroad in the world".

== Route ==
The short, one-mile-long (1.6 km) rail line connected the newly built Stanwood depot on the Great Northern Railway with downtown Stanwood. The railroad tracks ran along 271st Street from 102nd Avenue to the depot in East Stanwood on the south side of the street, roughly where the sidewalks are today. It was nicknamed "Dinky" for its small size.

== History ==
Stanwood was settled in the 1870s and in 1891 received its first station on the Seattle and Montana Railroad, which later merged into the Great Northern Railway. The station was located in the less flood-prone area one mile (1.6 km) east of the town, which was on the bank of the Stillaguamish River. A new railway was constructed between the depot and Stanwood in 1904 by local businessman John W. Hall.

The railway was operated by John W. Hall (1870–1931), his wife Alice and later their son Jesse. He ordered a crew to demolish one corner of his stable on Market Street and Saratoga Street to lay the tracks of the H & H Railroad to East Stanwood. From 1904, the "Dinky" transported passengers and cargo between the town and depot.

HC Anderson (1865–1914) was the main investor and the Stanwood Lumber Company was initially the main client of the railway. Occasionally, it was used by children on the way to and from school. By the 1920s, passenger service was eliminated due to competition from automobiles. The railroad ceased operations in 1938 because of the low traffic and the completion of new highways between the two towns.

The H & H was famous for being "the shortest railroad in the world". In 1932 this fact was featured in the syndicated cartoon Strange as It Seems.
