= Lake Ketchum, Washington =

- CDP
- Location of Lake Ketchum, Washington
- Coordinates: 48°17′5″N 122°20′33″W
- Country: United States
- State: Washington
- County: Snohomish

Area
  - Total: 3.1 sq mi (8.1 km^{2})
  - Land: 3.1 sq mi (8.1 km^{2})
  - Water: 0.039 sq mi (0.1 km^{2})
- Elevation: 230 ft (70 m)

Population (2020)
  - Total: 1,268
  - Density: 410/sq mi (160/km^{2})
- Time zone: UTC-8 (Pacific (PST))
  - Summer (DST): UTC-7 (PDT)
- ZIP Code: 98292
- Area code(s): 360, 564
- FIPS code: 53-37415
- GNIS feature ID: 1852945

Lake Ketchum is a census-designated place (CDP) in Snohomish County, Washington, United States. The population was 1,268 at the 2020 census, up from 930 at the 2010 census.

== Geography ==
Lake Ketchum is located at 48°17′5″N 122°20′33″W (48.284778, -122.342511).

According to the United States Census Bureau, the CDP has a total area of 3.1 square miles (8.0 km^{2}), of which, 3.1 square miles (8.0 km^{2}) of it is land and 0.04 square miles (0.10 km^{2}) of it (0.96%) is water.

== Demographics ==
Historical population
Census	Pop.	Note	%±
2000	1,173		—
2010	930		−20.7%
2020	1,268		36.3%
U.S. Decennial Census; 1970 1980 1990; 2000 2010

Lake Ketchum first appeared as a census designated place in the 2000 U.S. census.

=== Racial and ethnic composition ===
Lake Ketchum CDP, Washington – Racial and ethnic composition Note: the US Census treats Hispanic/Latino as an ethnic category. This table excludes Latinos from the racial categories and assigns them to a separate category. Hispanics/Latinos may be of any race.
Race / Ethnicity (NH = Non-Hispanic)	Pop 2000	Pop 2010	Pop 2020	% 2000	% 2010	% 2020
White alone (NH)	1,103	854	1,071	94.03%	91.83%	84.46%
Black or African American alone (NH)	2	4	9	0.17%	0.43%	0.71%
Native American or Alaska Native alone (NH)	11	10	6	0.94%	1.08%	0.47%
Asian alone (NH)	3	14	14	0.26%	1.51%	1.10%
Native Hawaiian or Pacific Islander alone (NH)	0	0	0	0.00%	0.00%	0.00%
Other race alone (NH)	0	4	11	0.00%	0.43%	0.87%
Mixed race or Multiracial (NH)	13	27	67	1.11%	2.90%	5.28%
Hispanic or Latino (any race)	41	17	90	3.50%	1.83%	7.10%
Total	1,173	930	1,268	100.00%	100.00%	100.00%

=== 2000 census ===
As of the census of 2000, there were 1,173 people, 406 households, and 310 families living in the CDP. The population density was 377.4 people per square mile (145.7 people/km^{2}). There were 431 housing units at an average density of 138.7 units per square mile (53.6 units/km^{2}). The racial makeup of the CDP was 95.65% White, 0.17% African American, 1.28% Native American, 0.34% Asian, 1.36% from other races, and 1.19% from two or more races. Hispanic or Latino of any race were 3.50% of the population.

There were 406 households, out of which 39.4% had children under the age of 18 living with them, 63.8% were married couples living together, 8.4% had a female householder with no husband present, and 23.6% were non-families. 17.7% of all households were made up of individuals, and 4.7% had someone living alone who was 65 years of age or older. The average household size was 2.89 and the average family size was 3.27.

In the CDP, the age distribution of the population shows 29.5% under the age of 18, 7.4% from 18 to 24, 31.2% from 25 to 44, 23.6% from 45 to 64, and 8.3% who were 65 years of age or older. The median age was 36 years. For every 100 females, there were 106.5 males. For every 100 females age 18 and over, there were 99.3 males.

The median income for a household in the CDP was $60,029, and the median income for a family was $62,148. Males had a median income of $38,235 versus $28,047 for females. The per capita income for the CDP was $19,538. About 3.2% of families and 10.2% of the population were below the poverty line, including 7.7% of those under age 18 and 6.8% of those age 65 or over.

== Education ==
The community is served by the Stanwood-Camano School District.

The zoned elementary school and middle school are Stanwood Elementary School and Stanwood Middle School. The Stanwood-Camano district's sole comprehensive high school is Stanwood High School.
