= Zakarias Martin Toftezen =

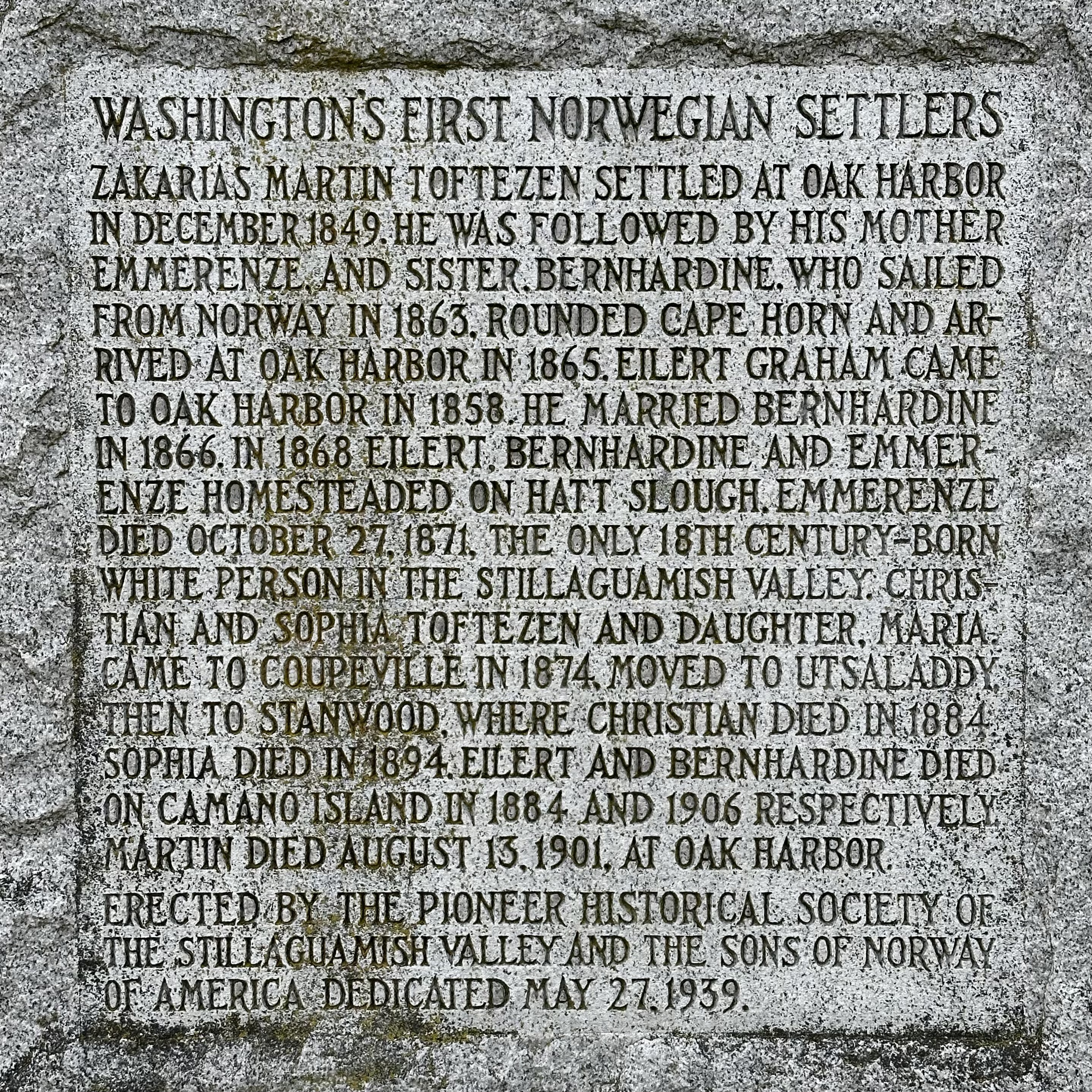
Toftezen Memorial, Stanwood

Zakarias Martin Toftezen (September 17, 1821 – August 13, 1901) was an early pioneer in the Oregon Territory and the first Norwegian immigrant to settle in the area which would later become the State of Washington.

Toftezen was from Levanger in Nordre Trondheim county, Norway. In late 1849, he first arrived on Whidbey Island. He filed his land claim in 1851, taking 320 acres in what is now Oak Harbor. He was joined by his mother Emmerence (1792–1871) and sister Bernhardine (1822–1906) in 1865. His brother Ole Christian Toftezen (1816–1884) and family arrived in the area during 1874.

Toftezen died in 1901 and was buried at the Our Saviour's Lutheran Church Cemetery in Stanwood, Washington. A monument was erected by the Pioneer Historical Society of the Stillaguamish Valley and the Sons of Norway of America on May 27, 1939. The memorial dedication was attended by Crown Prince Olav of Norway.
