= Clara Stanwood Pearson =

American pioneer in the Washington Territory

- Born: Clara Jane Stanwood; March 18, 1849; Lowell, Massachusetts
- Died: June 3, 1910 (aged 61); Stanwood, Washington
- Spouse: D. O. Pearson

Clara Stanwood Pearson (March 18, 1849 – July 3, 1910) was an American pioneer in the Washington Territory and the eponym of the town of Stanwood.

== Early life ==
Clara Jane Stanwood was born on March 18, 1849, in Lowell, Massachusetts.

== Mercer Expeditions ==
Clara's home town of Lowell, and her husband and in-laws the Pearsons, are closely associated with Asa Mercer's expeditions to bring young women and settlers to the Puget Sound.

Among the "Mercer Girls" on the first expedition in 1864 were Georgia and Josephine Pearson, sisters, accompanied by their father Daniel Pearson. Mercer returned to Lowell in 1865. On his second expedition, arriving in Washington Territory in 1866, were Daniel's wife Mrs. Pearson, their son Daniel O., and daughter Flora.

Clara Stanwood joined her beau Daniel (D. O.) Pearson in 1868, and they were married that year. D. O. and Clara farmed on Whidby Island until 1877.

Daniel the elder served as lightkeeper at the nearby Admiralty Head lighthouse with daughter Flora as his assistant.

== Stanwood ==
In 1877, D. O. and Clara moved to Centerville at the mouth of the Stillaguamish River, where the Pearsons built a wharf, warehouse, and store. D. O. also began serving as the postmaster of the latent community.

"Centerville" was found to be too common of a place name, so it fell upon the postmaster to pick a new designation that would result in less misdelivered mail.

The new name "Stanwood" was chosen in honor of Clara's maiden name.

The Pearsons later built the D. O. Pearson House, now listed on the National Register of Historic Places and home to the Stanwood Area Historical Society.
