= Kayak Point County Park =

County park in Snohomish County, Washington, United States

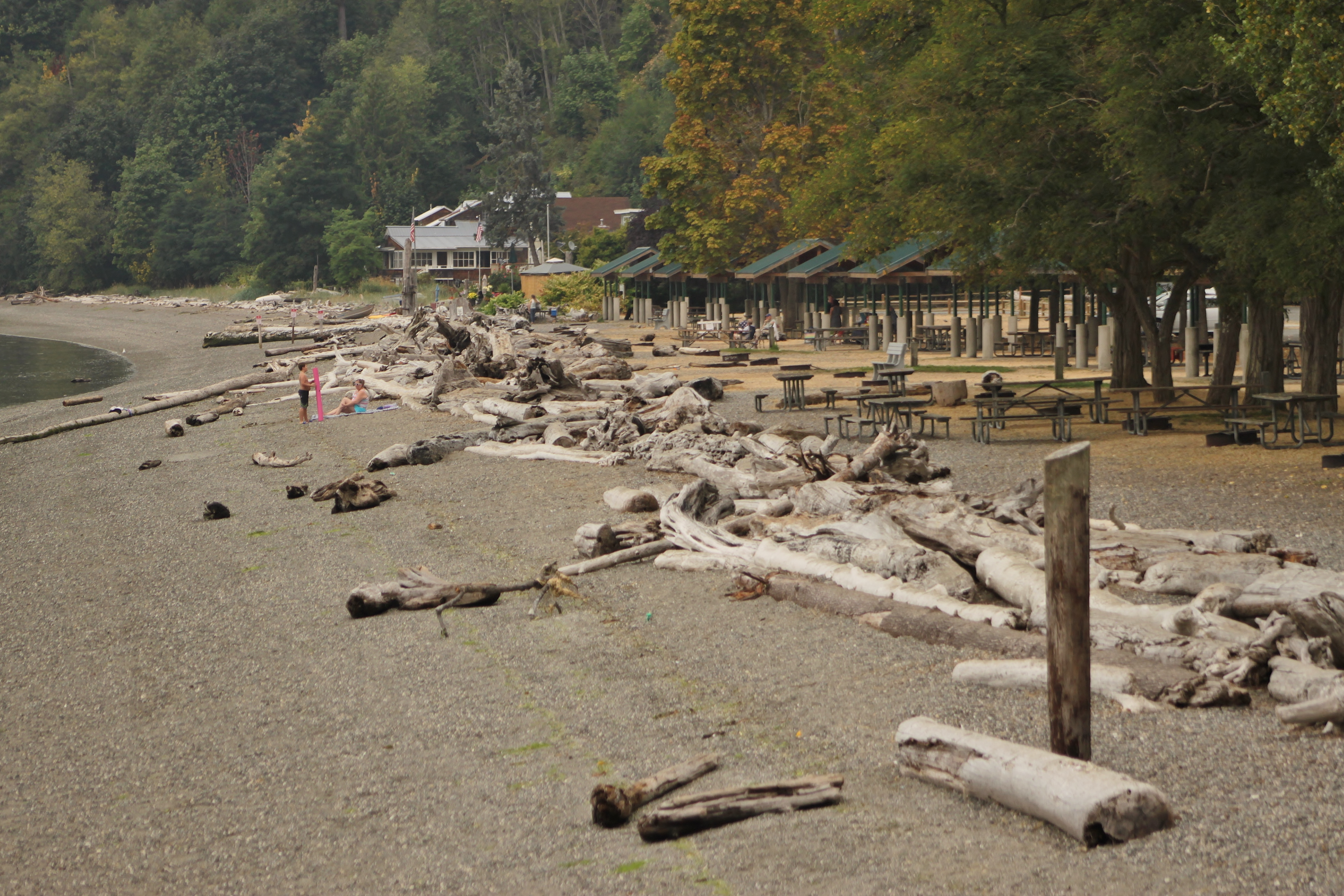
- The beach at Kayak Point County Park, pictured in 2017

- Location within Washington (state) Location within the United States
- Location: Snohomish County, Washington, U.S.
- Coordinates: 48.135°N 122.368°W
- Area: 670 acres (270 ha)
- Elevation: 3 ft (0.9 m)
- Established: 1972
- Governing body: Snohomish County Parks and Recreation

Kayak Point County Park is a county park near Warm Beach, in Snohomish County, Washington. The 670-acre (270 ha) park is located along Port Susan and includes a saltwater beach, a boat launch, a disc golf course, and public campgrounds. Kayak Point is the most popular county park in Snohomish County and is mainly visited for recreational fishing, crabbing, and birdwatching.

Kayak Point was home to a private, locally-run seaside resort from the 1920s to 1950s, named after a pair of Inuit (King Island style) kayaks brought to the resort from Alaska. In the 1960s, Atlantic Richfield proposed construction of an oil refinery at Kayak Point, purchasing 1,200 acres (490 ha) of land, and received approval from the county to re-zone the area for industrial use. During public hearings, local residents opposed the refinery and later filed a lawsuit against the county over its re-zoning decision, which was voided by the Washington Supreme Court in 1979 as an inequitable use of "spot zoning". Atlantic Richfield later attempted to develop some of its land holdings into a master-planned residential community in the 1970s, but failed to receive county approval due to a lack of good roads and sewers.

The county park was established in 1972, using waterfront property bought by the county government from Atlantic Richfield. It was dedicated in 1976 and underwent major renovations starting in 2023.

== History ==
Originally part of the ancestral territory of the Snohomish people, the Kayak Point area was settled by American loggers from the 1850s to 1890s. After the near-shore timber had been logged away, Seattle real estate developer Clarence Dayton Hillman bought 12,000 acres (4,900 ha) along Port Susan, from Kayak Point to modern-day Warm Beach, from 1907 to 1909. Hillman platted the area, naming it "Birmingham", and sold five-acre (2.0 ha) parcels for $75 each (equivalent to $2,000 in 2025 dollars), advertising in Seattle-area newspapers during the 1909 Alaska–Yukon–Pacific Exposition to prospective buyers. Heinrich F.W. Kilian (b.1864-d.1920) -- a teacher at Broadway High School in Seattle -- and his family purchased 62 of these lots and settled at the south end of Birmingham. Starting in 1927, Bruno 'Art' Kilian (b.1898-d.1984) developed the family's properties into a seaside resort, building roads, cabins, and a boat launch. The resort was named "Kayak Point", after a pair of Inuit kayaks brought from the King Island, Alaska area by Martin Kilian (b.1897-d.1977), and displayed in front of the resort store.

=== Atlantic Richfield proposals ===
The Atlantic Richfield Company purchased the resort and surrounding properties in the late 1950s, with the intent of building an oil refinery on the site. In the interim, the resort was leased to a Tacoma businessman and would continue operating until the refinery was approved for construction. Atlantic Richfield formally unveiled their proposed 2,200-acre (3.4 sq mi; 8.9 km^{2}) oil refinery in 1967, requesting that the county government issue permits to allow for the refinery's construction and operation as an exception to the area's rural residential zoning. Atlantic Richfield selected Kayak Point due to its protected deep water location, road access, available workforce, and proximity to Canada, where crude oil would be delivered via pipeline. The $100 million (equivalent to $736 million in 2025 dollars) refinery would employ 400 workers and create an additional 800 jobs in supporting industries.

The plans angered local residents, who organized the Save Port Susan Committee and testified against the zoning exception during a public hearing on November 30, 1967. Despite the testimony, the county planning commission and the county board of commissioners approved a change in the comprehensive plan to rezone Kayak Point for the oil refinery. As part of the rezoning plan, Atlantic Richfield agreed to allocate 240 acres (0.97 km^{2}) to public recreation, as well as clean up any oil spills in the area regardless of fault. Opponents of the refinery, while pleased with the spill provision, sought penalties and damages in the event of a spill and feared that further petrochemical development could follow the refinery's opening.

In response to the rezoning, 19 members of the Save Port Susan Bay Committee filed a lawsuit against the county commissioners and planning commission on June 24, 1968. An additional legal challenge, coming in the form of a complaint for declaratory judgment, was filed in September by the committee questioning enforcement of the rezoning agreement's conditions on pollution control and its effects on Port Susan residents. On October 28, 1968, Atlantic Richfield announced that it was dropping plans for the refinery at Kayak Point, instead choosing to build it at Cherry Point near Bellingham, due to the delays from litigation and the immediate needs for a new refinery. A similar proposal from Union Oil for a nearby site on Port Susan was defeated by the county planning commission in 1971, despite support from the Tulalip Tribes.

The Save Port Susan Bay Committee nonetheless continued its legal challenge, seeking to revert the rezoning decision and return the area to low-density residential zoning. After denying Atlantic Richfield's motion to dismiss the lawsuit, a visiting judge from the King County Superior Court ruled that the county's rezone be held void over the denial of due process for local residents. The case was taken to the Washington Supreme Court, who ruled that the county's use of "spot zoning" was not in the area's best interest and thus void.

Atlantic Richfield, left with 1,200 acres (1.9 sq mi; 4.9 km^{2}) of remaining Kayak Point property, began design work for a master-planned community in the early 1970s. The planned development, consisting of 4,720 residential units housing nearly 15,000 people, hinged on the improvement on nearby roads. In 1979, the Snohomish County planning commission voted against the first phase of development, consisting of 109 homes, due to the inadequate states of local roads and sewer service. Atlantic Richfield decided to abandon its Kayak Point plans after the rejection and ultimately left its holdings undeveloped.

=== County park ===
The Snohomish County government began purchasing waterfront property near Kayak Point in 1968, intending to establish the county's first saltwater park. After Atlantic Richfield pulled its plans for a Kayak Point oil refinery, the county began negotiating a buyout of the company's waterfront property. The county purchased 670 acres (270 ha) from Atlantic Richfield in 1972 for $1.4 million (equivalent to $8 million in 2025 dollars), using federal and state funds; Atlantic Richfield also donated $250,000 towards development of the $3.3 million (equivalent to $18 million in 2025 dollars) county park and golf course. Kayak Point County Park was dedicated in 1976 by Art Kilian, the former owner of the resort.

In the late 2010s, the county began preparing for future renovations to Kayak Point County Park to support new developed areas and replace aging equipment. Proposals for the beachside area include additional camping areas, a community center, and environmental education exhibits; upland areas could receive new camping yurts, permanent cabins, and a ranger station. The renovation project, estimated to cost $20 million, was approved by the county council in June 2023 and is planned to include a new boat launch, removal of the seawall, and a new berm. The park closed on July 5, 2023, with work originally scheduled to be completed before a fish window that begins October 15. The reopening was later delayed to mid-2024 after work on the fishing pier was unable to be completed before the fish window closed. Kayak Point County Park reopened on June 14, 2024, with a reconstructed boat launch and part of the new berm to replace the former seawall. Construction of the second phase, which comprises a new entry road and improvements to amenities around the playground, began construction in February 2026.

== Facilities and activities ==
Kayak Point is a cuspate foreland on Port Susan, with a sandy beach that was derived from erosion of nearby bluffs. The 660-acre (270 ha) park is largely undeveloped, with only 40 acres (16 ha) dedicated solely to recreational uses. Kayak Point County Park features a 3,300-foot-long (1,000 m) sandy beach along Port Susan with picnic shelters and parking. The beach is interrupted by a boat launch and a 300-foot-long (90 m) pier. An open field is located adjacent to the beach and pier, featuring larger shelters and a playground. The park also offers overnight campsites, yurts, and cabins for rent. The park, the most popular in the county system, supports a variety of activities, including fishing, crabbing, windsurfing, hiking, and birdwatching.

To the east of Kayak Point County Park was an 18-hole public golf course that occupied 250 acres (100 ha) of the county park's lands. The golf course was designed by Ronald Fream and opened in 1977. It closed in October 2018 due to declining revenues and was replaced with a disc golf course that opened in February 2020. The course hosted the Kayak Point Open, an event sanctioned by the Professional Disc Golf Association, in 2021.
