= Stanwood station =

Train station in Stanwood, Washington

Stanwood, WA
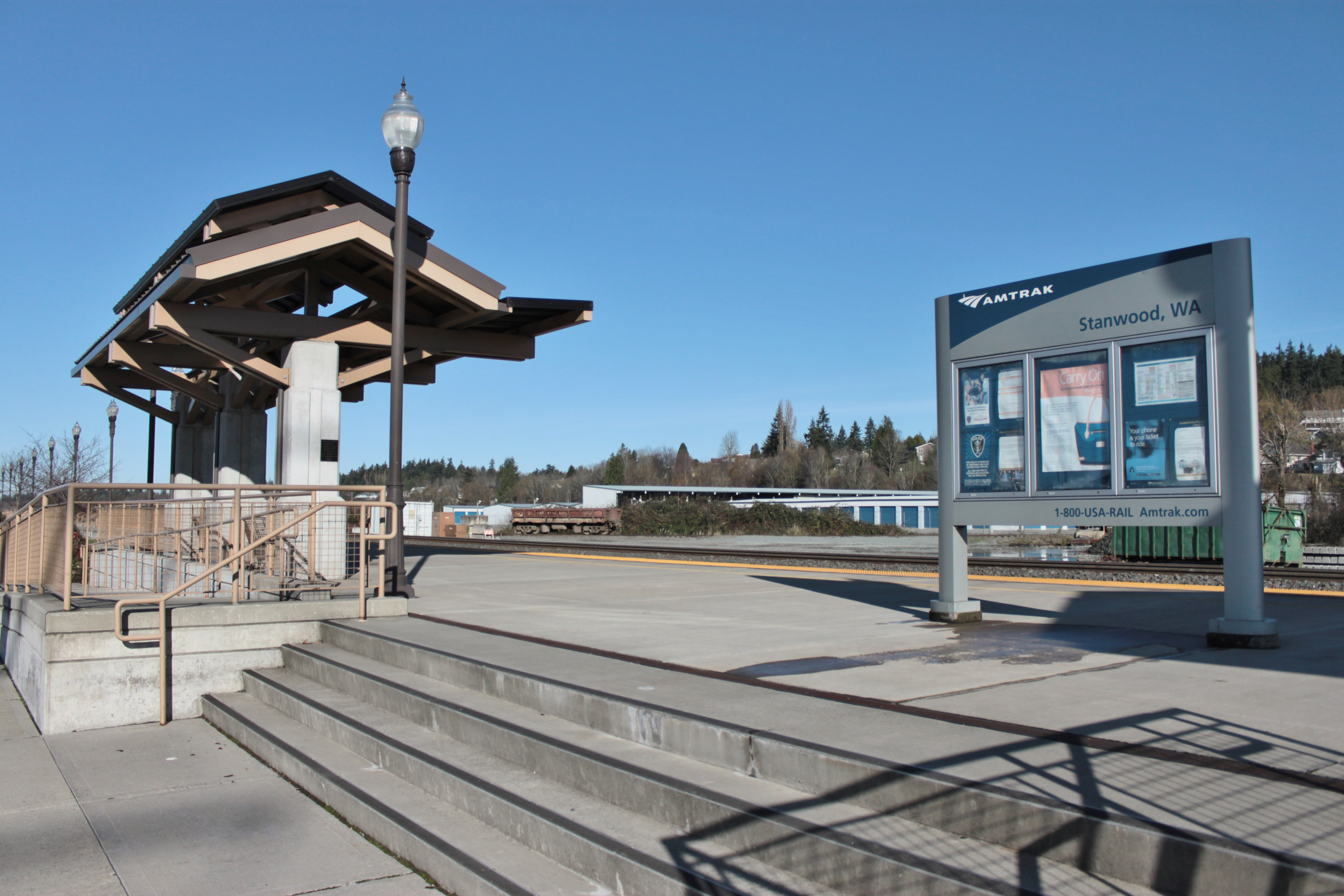

General information
- Location: 27111 Florence Way; Stanwood, Washington; United States
- Coordinates: 48°14′34″N 122°21′01″W
- Owner: Washington State Department of Transportation
- Line: BNSF Railway Bellingham Subdivision
- Platforms: 1 side platform
- Tracks: 2
- Connections: Community Transit, Island Transit

Construction
- Parking: 20 spaces
- Accessible: Yes

Other information
- Station code: Amtrak: STW

History
- Opened: November 21, 2009

Passengers
- FY 2025: 4,984 (Amtrak)

Services
Preceding station	Amtrak	Following station
Everett toward Eugene	Amtrak Cascades	Mount Vernon toward Vancouver, British Columbia
Former services
Preceding station	Great Northern Railway	Following station
Silvana toward Seattle	Vancouver, BC – Seattle	Fir toward Vancouver, BC
Preceding station	H and H Railroad	Following station
Terminus	The Dinky	East Stanwood toward Stanwood
Location

Stanwood is an Amtrak train station in the city of Stanwood, Washington, United States. It is served by intercity Amtrak Cascades trains and consists of a single platform and an adjacent parking lot. The station is in downtown Stanwood, near the intersection of State Route 532 and the Pioneer Highway, and is also served by Community Transit and Island Transit buses.

Stanwood station opened on November 21, 2009, as an infill station on the Cascades route after several delays in design and construction. The $5 million project to build the station was approved in 2006 and began construction in March 2009 alongside a siding expansion. Stanwood was previously served by intercity passenger trains on the Great Northern Railway until 1971.

== Description ==
Stanwood station has a single side platform, which runs northwest–southeast and measures 600 feet (180 m) long. The platform has two covered shelters (designed to resemble barns), lighting, and ramps from street level. The unstaffed station lacks a ticket vending machine and baggage services, requiring passengers to buy their ticket online, on the phone, or at another station. The station is located a block north of 271st Street Northwest, the main street through downtown Stanwood, and is adjacent to a public parking lot with 20 stalls reserved for Amtrak customers.

== History ==
Stanwood was settled in the 1870s and received its first train depot on the Seattle and Montana Railroad (later absorbed into the Great Northern Railway) in October 1891. The depot was constructed one mile (1.6 km) east of the city's downtown, which was located on the Stillaguamish River, and necessitated the construction of the short H & H Railroad in 1904 to connect the two; it was nicknamed the "Dinky" and claimed to be the shortest steam railroad in the world, but suspended operations in 1938 due to low patronage and competition from automobiles. The city of East Stanwood was later established around the depot in 1906 and remained separate from Stanwood until the two communities were merged into one city in 1960. The Stanwood depot was rebuilt in 1922 and was served by passenger trains until April 30, 1971, when all Seattle–Vancouver service was suspended after Amtrak took over passenger operations from Great Northern (by then part of Burlington Northern). The depot was later demolished in the late 1970s.

Vancouver's selection as host city of the 2010 Winter Olympics accelerated several long-term projects along the Amtrak Cascades corridor to improve train operations. The $3 million expansion of a siding through Stanwood was named as a high priority and was sent to the state legislature for funding. Downtown boosters in Stanwood began pushing for a new train station in the early 2000s, hoping to piggyback off the siding expansion project, and appealed to state senator Mary Margaret Haugen for support. Senator Haugen, chairwoman of the Senate transportation committee, introduced a bill to fund the project's $5 million design and construction cost. The bill was passed by the state legislature in 2006, also approving $15 million for the original siding expansion. The legislature also considered an earlier plan that would have included provisions for commuter rail service, which was later removed from the bill.

Stanwood station when planned in 2006 was "intended to serve as an interim facility" that could be replaced by a larger multi-modal transportation facility at a later date.

Construction on the station was scheduled to begin in 2007, but was delayed by a year due to design changes requested by BNSF and a disagreement between state and federal officials over the height of the platform. The Washington State Department of Transportation (WSDOT) began work on the siding expansion in May 2008 and on the station in April 2009. The station's construction was further delayed after the discovery of lead contamination at the platform site, which cost $100,000 to cleanup and caused the removal of a public restroom from design plans. Stanwood station opened on November 21, 2009, with a town celebration and ribbon-cutting after the arrival of the first northbound train.

== Services ==
The station is served by four daily trips on Amtrak Cascades, which travels south to Seattle via Everett and north to Vancouver, British Columbia, via Mount Vernon and Bellingham. Stanwood has fairly low ridership compared to other Cascades stops, with only 5,856 passenger boardings in fiscal year 2019—the fourth-lowest in the state, with the others being Empire Builder stops. In addition to Cascades, Stanwood station is adjacent to bus stops served by Community Transit and Island Transit routes to Camano Island and Arlington.
