= Floyd Norgaard Cultural Center =

- Stanwood IOOF Public Hall
- U.S. National Register of Historic Places
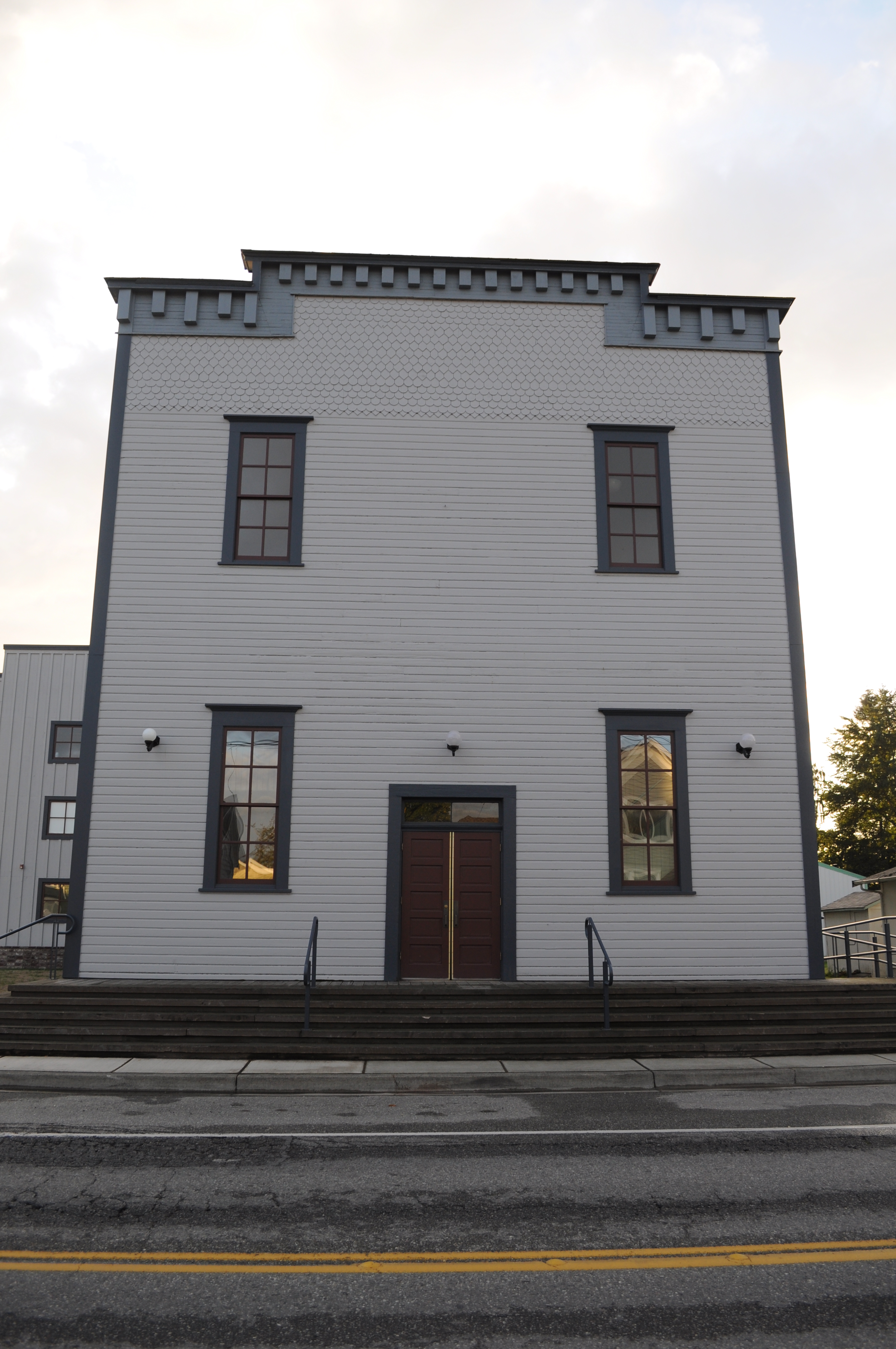
- The building's present incarnation as the Floyd Norgaard Cultural Center

- Location within Washington (state)
- Location: 27128 102nd Avenue NW, Stanwood, Washington
- Coordinates: 48°14′35″N 122°22′15″W
- Area: Less than one acre
- Built: 1902
- Architectural style: Vernacular: western falsefront
- NRHP reference No.: 02000087
- Added to NRHP: February 21, 2002

The Floyd Norgaard Cultural Center, previously known as the Stanwood IOOF Public Hall, is a building in Stanwood, Washington, United States, that was constructed in 1902. It served historically as a meeting hall. It was listed on the National Register of Historic Places in 2002.

The building was constructed by the Stanwood Fraternal Association, which took possession of the site in 1902. The Stanwood I.O.O.F. Lodge #249 purchased the building in 1909. It was originally topped with a gable roof, which was replaced with the present flat roof, possibly during a remodelling that took place in 1922.

The building served as a performance and meeting hall from the time of its construction until about 1939. The wide-ranging public presentations seen at the building included boxing matches, musical concerts, political lectures, farm shows, and high school dances. The building was used for storage from 1939 until 2000.

The building was purchased in 2000 by the Stanwood Area Historical Society when it was found to be in a heavily deteriorated state. With its rehabilitation the hall was transformed into the Floyd Norgaard Cultural Center, named in honor of Floyd L. Norgaard, who spent his childhood in Stanwood and returned to live there in retirement.

In 2014, the building saw further repairs with the replacement of siding on the south wall.
