= Stanwood-Camano School District =

School district in Washington state

Stanwood-Camano School District No. 401 is a public school district in the U.S. state of Washington, serving Stanwood and Camano Island. As of 2015, the school district enrolls 4,554 students and employs 225 teachers.

The district includes a portion of Snohomish County. In that county, the district covers the municipality of Stanwood, the census-designated places of Lake Ketchum, Northwest Stanwood, and Warm Beach. It also has the majority of Kayak Point CDP and most of Sunday Lake CDP. A portion is in Island County, where the district covers Camano.

Separate school districts had been established in Stanwood, East Stanwood, and Camano. The Stanwood, Camano Island, Florence, Norman, and Silvana school districts consolidated into one district in 1937. That district in turn consolidated with the East Stanwood and Warm Beach districts in 1944, forming the Twin City School District. The district changed its name to the Stanwood School District after Stanwood and East Stanwood merged into a single municipality. The district began using its current name in 1999.

== Schools ==
All secondary (middle and high) schools are in Stanwood.

High schools

- Stanwood High School
- Lincoln Hill High School (alternative school)

Middle schools

- Port Susan Middle School
- Stanwood Middle School

Elementary schools

- Cedarhome Elementary School - Stanwood
- Elger Bay Elementary School - Camano - Opened in 2000.
- Stanwood Elementary School - Stanwood
- Twin City Elementary School - Stanwood
- Utsalady Elementary School - Camano - Opened in 2000.

K-12 schools

- Saratoga School (homeschool partnership program)
