= Stanwood (automobile) =

Defunct American motor vehicle manufacturer

The Stanwood was an American automobile manufactured by the Stanwood Motor Company from 1920 until 1922 in St Louis, Missouri.

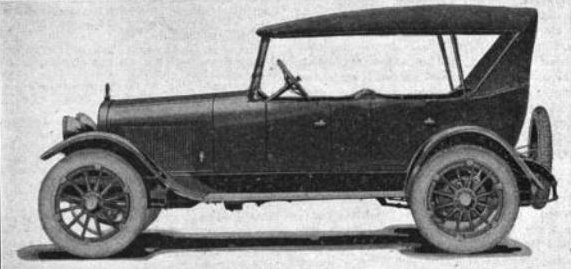
Stanwood Six

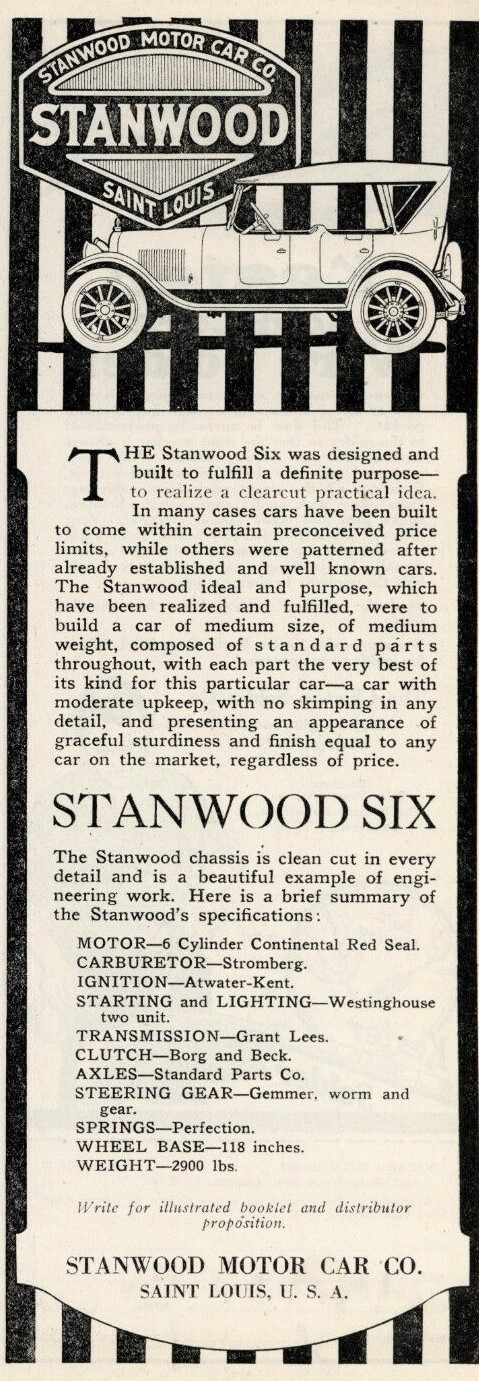
1920 Stanwood advertisement in Motor Age

== History ==
Fred H. Berger was the chief engineer of the Stanwood Motor Car Company. The Stanwood Six was an "assembled car" with Continental 7R six-cylinder engine. Parts advertised as fitted included Stromberg Carburetor, Westinghouse starting and lighting, Grant-Lees transmission, Borg & Beck clutch, Standard Parts rear axle, Bock roller bearings, Stewart-Warner vacuum feed fuel system, Gemmer steering gear, Atwater-Kent ignition, Perfection springs and Alemite chassis lubrication system.

Offered in the first year only as a Touring car, on a 118-inch wheelbase at $2,050 (equivalent to $32,946 in 2025), a roadster and closed sedan were added for 1922. Production was approximately 200 to 300 cars before closing in 1922.
