= Boat ramp =

Man-made entry point for watercraft

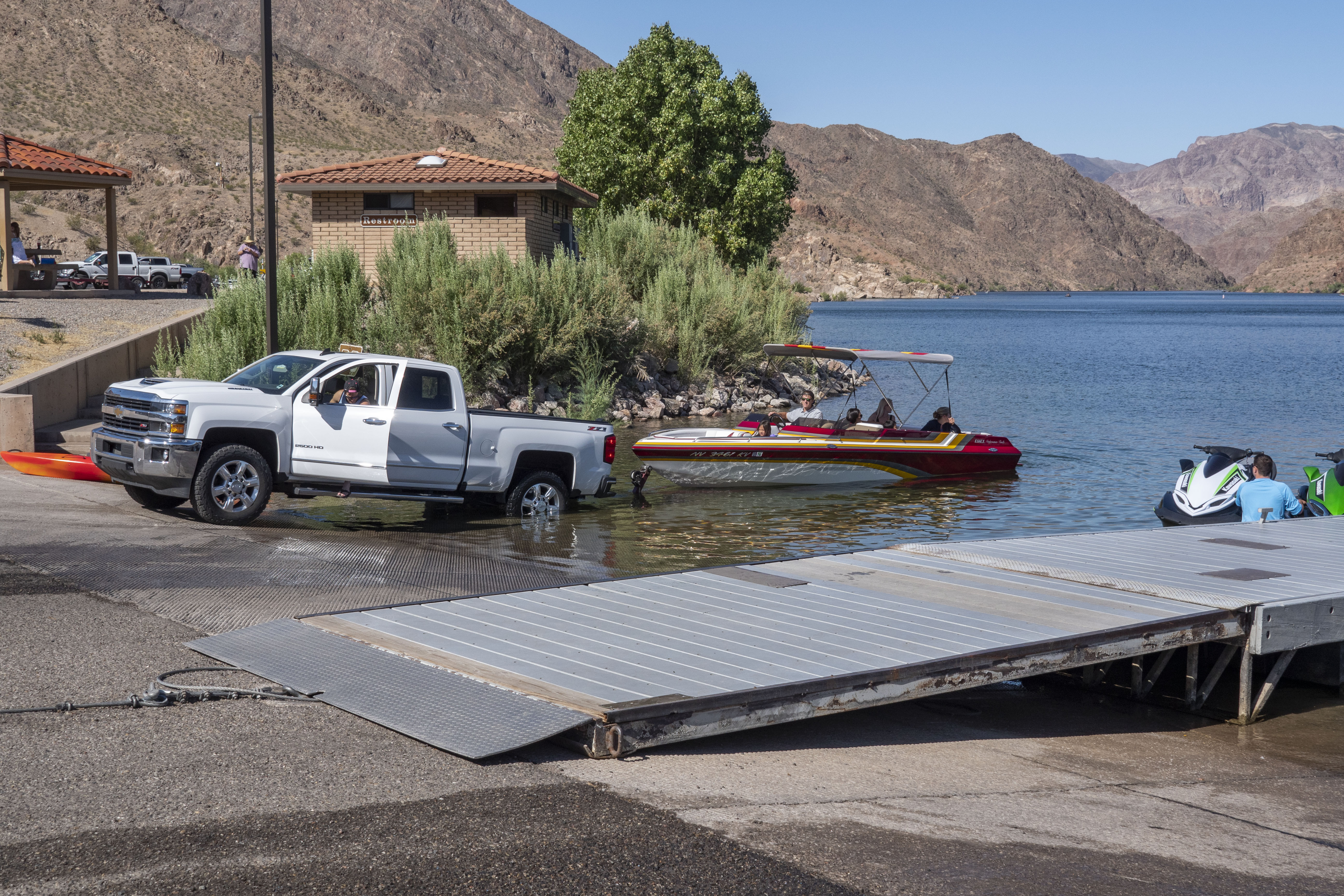
Willow Beach Launch Ramp in Arizona in 2019

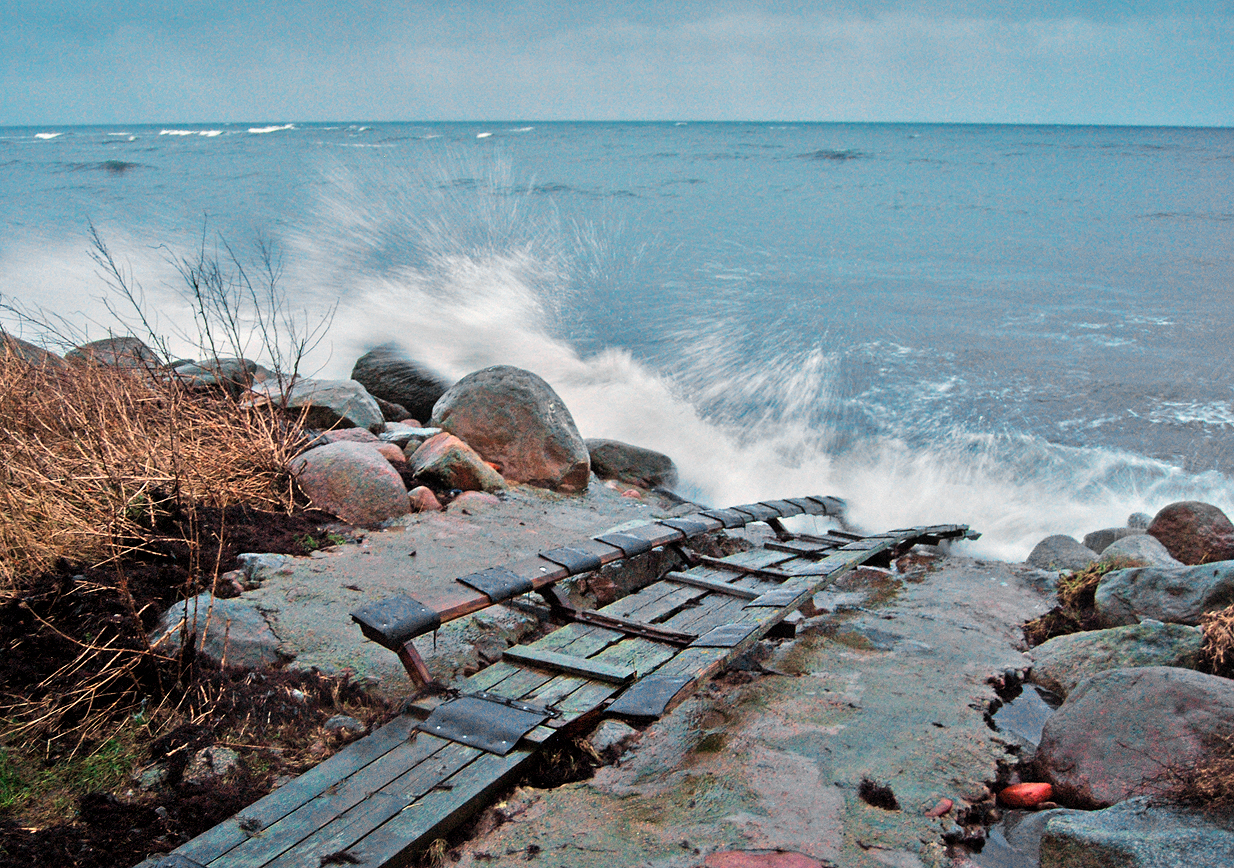
Boat ramp at Ystad, Sweden

A boat ramp, also known as a boat launch, is a reinforced ramp on shore by which boats can be moved to and from the water.

Typical use of a boat ramp is launching and retrieving small boats on trailers towed by automobiles. A boat launch can also be used for flying boats on their undercarriage.

Boat ramps are steeper than slipways. They generally consist of a slab of reinforced concrete on a foundation without piling. In some circumstances, beaches can function as boat ramps.

A boat ramp has a significant environmental impact. This is primarily caused by the parking space that is required for cars and boat trailers.

== Purpose and use ==
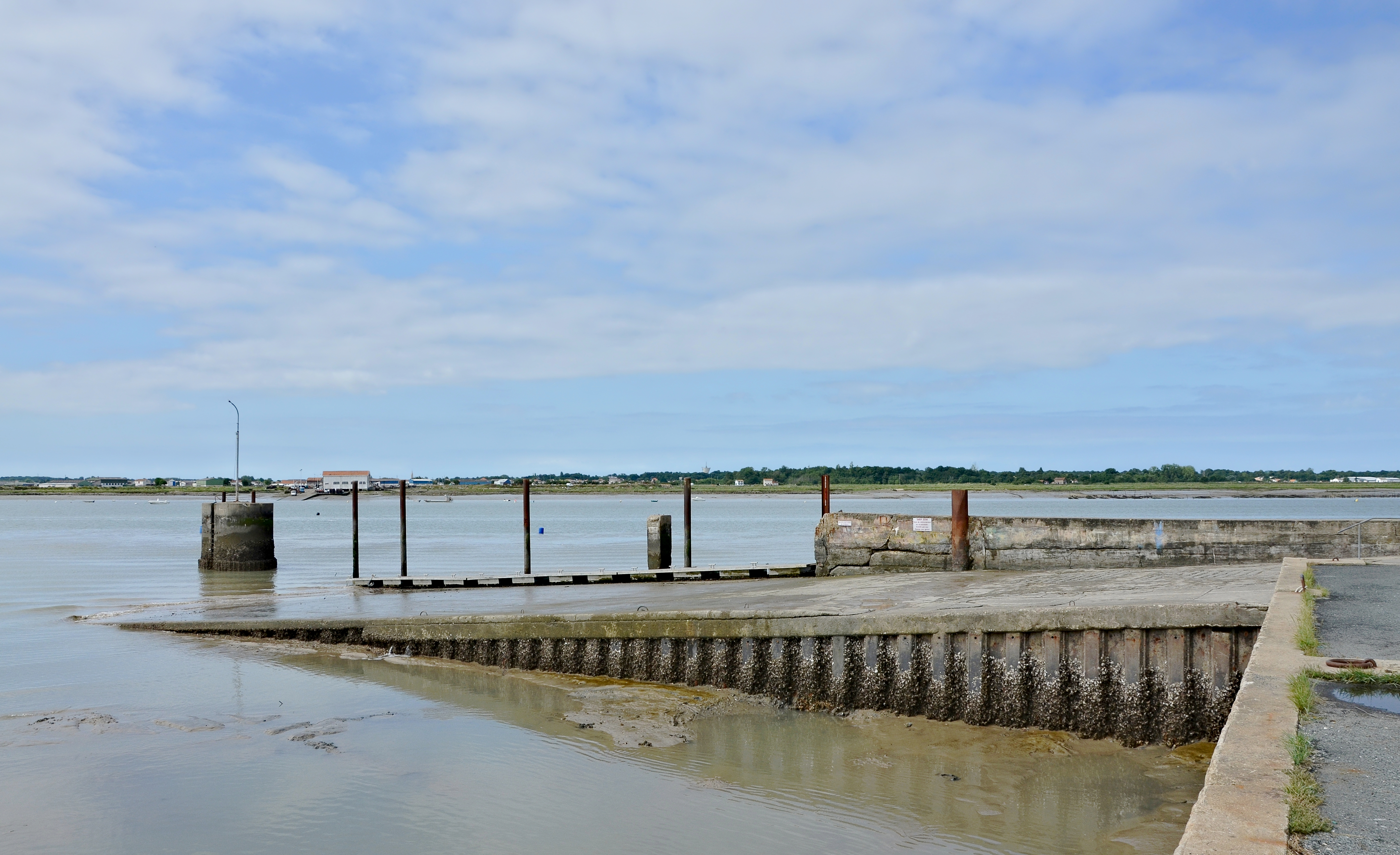
Boat ramp in Marennes, Charente-Maritime, France

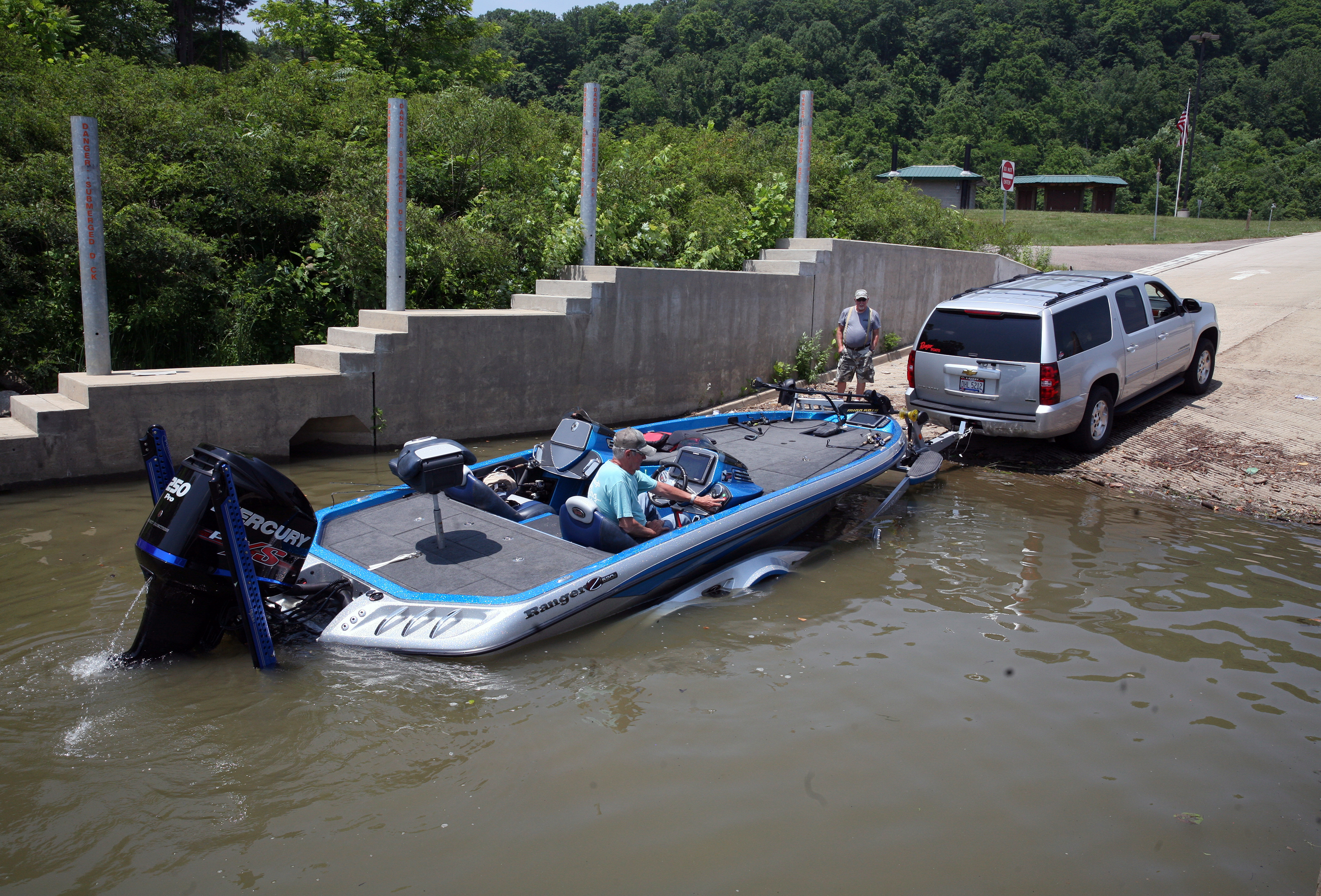
Using drive off/on in 2015

A boat ramp or launch is a sloping, stabilized roadway or entry point constructed on the shoreline for launching boats from vehicular trailers or by hand. They are therefore typically oriented perpendicular to the shoreline.

Typical use of a boat ramp by a car and boat trailer is as follows: First preparations like closing lens plugs, removing the light bar from the trailer, tilting up any outboard motor etc. are done. Car and trailer then reverse down the ramp, preferably till the trailer axles stay just above the water. The boat is then carefully lowered into the water by using the winch. When the boat is taken out of the water, it is precisely positioned so the keel will be on the keel rollers. The winch is then used to pull it up.

As an alternative, a drive off/drive on trailer can be used. This means that the boat will move off and back on to the trailer by its own power instead of being moved by the winch. Some prefer to use a drive off/drive on trailer to float the boat off. Modern drive off/drive on trailers seem to submerge further than traditional trailers.

== Characteristics ==
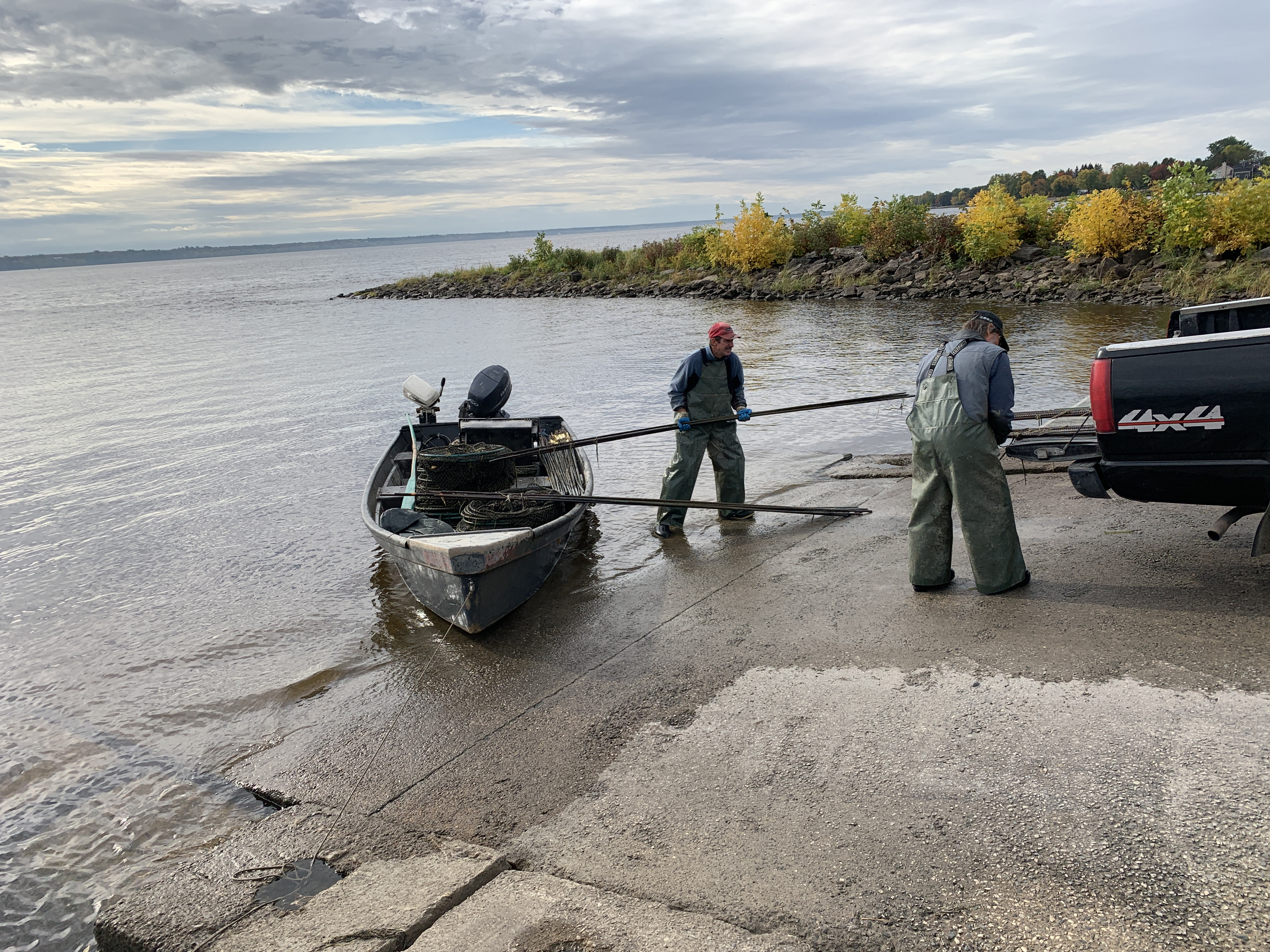
Boat launch of concrete slabs in Batiscan, Canada

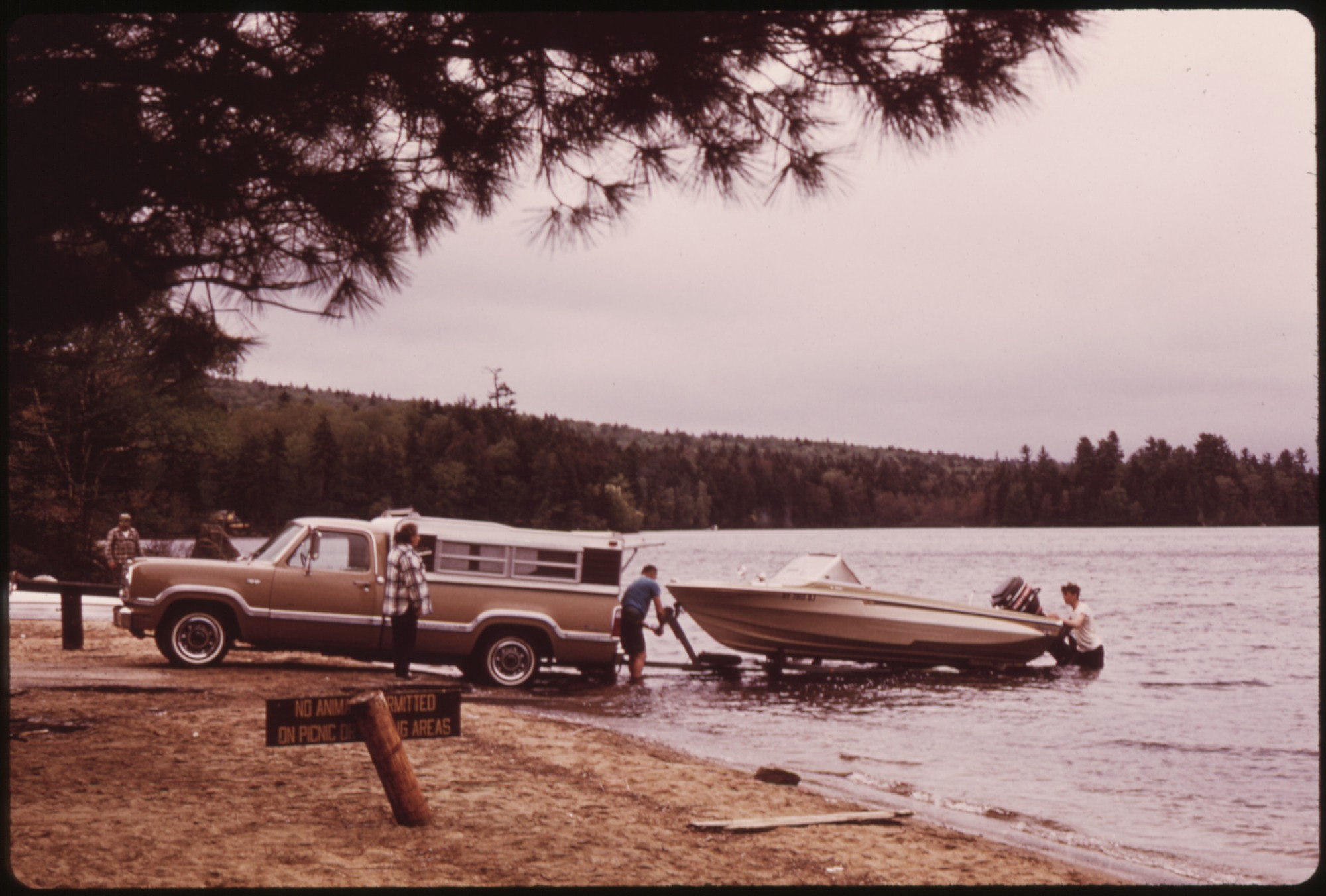
Winching up a boat at Raquette Lake, NY, 1973

Boat launches are usually located in areas protected from wind and waves with access to deep water close to shore. They are often part of marinas and parking lots. Ideally, they are connected to a maintained road.

The length and width of the ramp vary with intended use. The length also depends on the slope of the shoreline and seasonal and tidal water levels. Boat launches extend into the water at a slope of typically 12 to 15 percent. This is steeper than a stern-first slipway, which inclines at about 5 percent, one in twenty. While slipway slope is related to size, even the smallest slipways do not decline more than 10 percent.

The ramp should extend into at least three feet of water, preferably four feet. If boats are launched from a drive off/on trailer (see above), the ramp should extend into at least five feet of water. Otherwise, the propeller will wash out and undermine the ramp, creating a drop-off on which trailers can get stuck. Many older boat ramps are vulnerable to this effect.

In fresh water, the preferred way of boat ramp construction starts with building a coffer dam to make the construction area dry. Next the bed of the ramp is made by placing a minimum of 8 in (20.32 cm) of crushed stone on the form of the ramp. Concrete is then poured in the dry over the bed. This is reinforced by steel bars and should be finished somewhat roughly so it provides traction.

If the ramp does not have to be that sturdy, the ramp can be formed and poured on shore on a thin layer of sand called a crusher run. After the concrete has dried, it is then shoved into the water. Of course, the crusher run has to be at the same angle as the boat ramp. Other alternatives are to pour concrete through the water, or to use prefabricated slabs of concrete. Gravel can also be used in construction.

Many boat ramps feature a pier to assist with launching and retrieving boats. Most piers use piling for foundation, but most boat ramps do not.

== The beach as a boat ramp ==
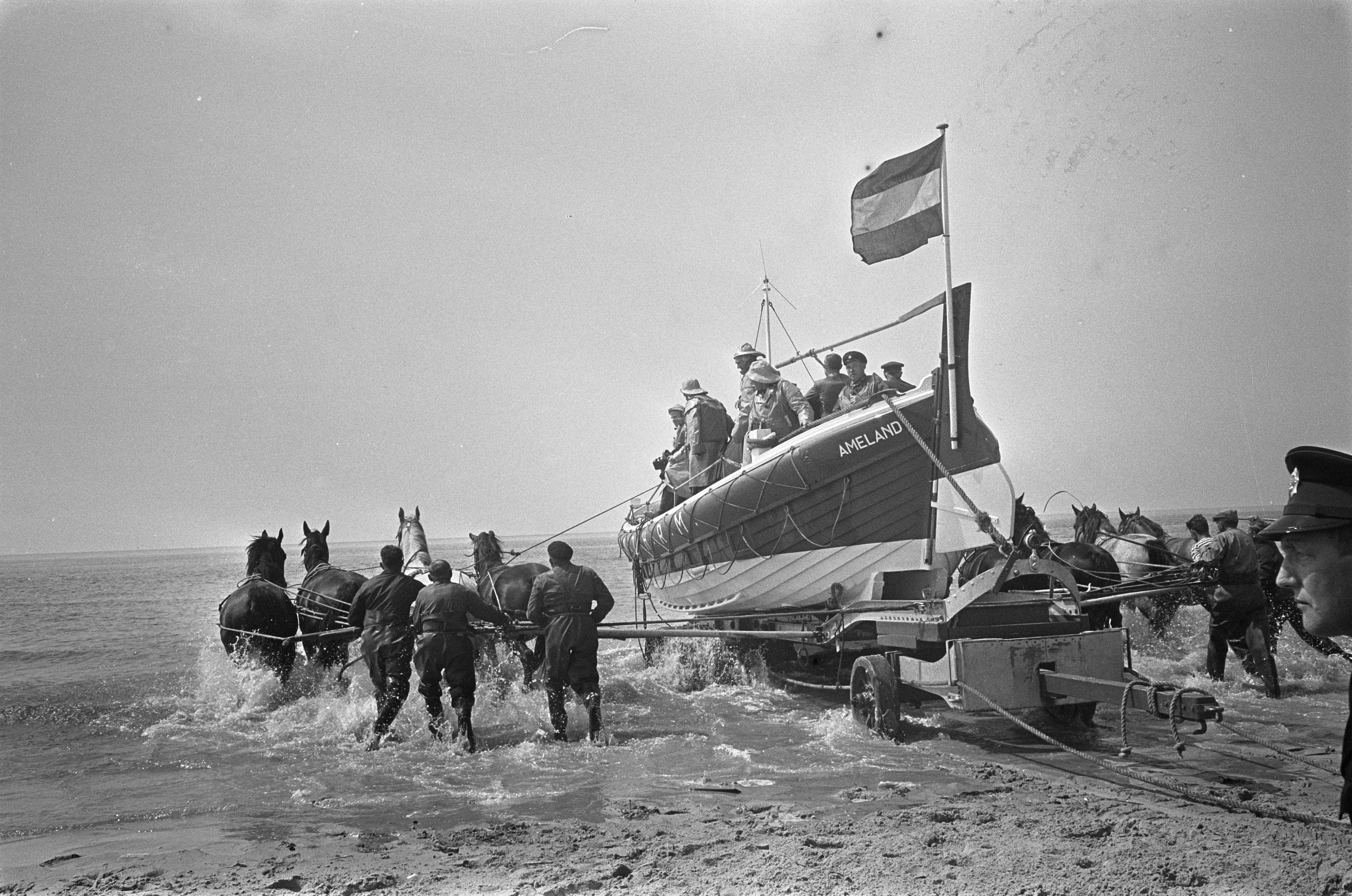
The historic Ameland rescue boat uses a tracked trailer

A gently sloping beach kind of forms a natural boat ramp. In the 1950s, boats were launched by car and trailer on freshwater beaches, without a special boat ramp having been constructed.

On sea beaches, such a practice is more difficult. In good circumstances, smaller rigid inflatable boats can indeed be launched from the beach by using a trailer as if the beach was a boat ramp. However, waves, bad weather, bad roads, or a somewhat heavier boat make that in general, special equipment is required to use a sea beach as a boat ramp.

Special equipment for moving the trailer over the beach and into the water used to consist of tracked vehicles or horses. Nowadays a special tractor like the Talus MB-4H amphibious tractor is more usual. The carriage itself will also be different. More sizable boats used to require tracked trailers. In difficult weather even a small boat will need a special trailer. The Talus Atlantic 85 DO-DO launch carriage is an example.

== Environmental impact ==
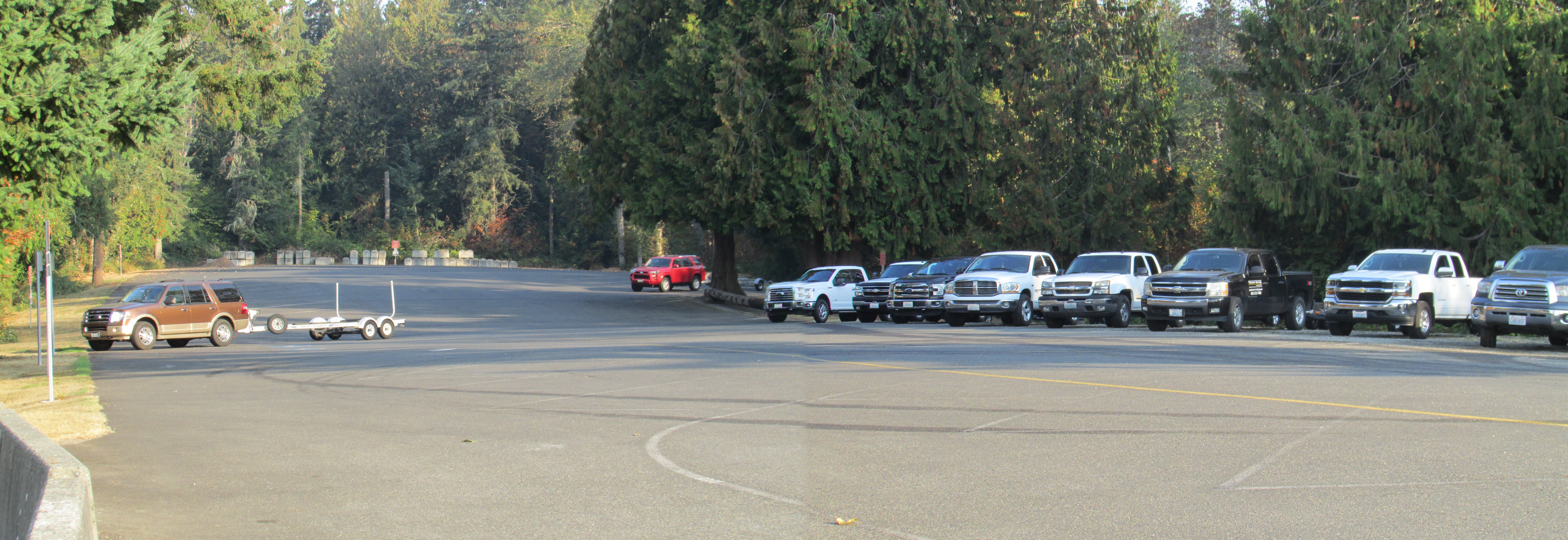
Parking at Lake Tapps, Wa.

Construction of a recreational boat ramp can have a significant environmental impact. On lakes and rivers, construction that involves concrete is likely to pollute the water if no measures are taken to isolate the construction site from contact with the surrounding water. Furthermore, every boat launch with a hard surface is likely to cause a harmful alternation, disruption or destruction of fish habitat. In many areas, authorities will therefore make construction dependent on a permit.

Even if boat launches are carefully planned, environmental impact will still be significant. In Virginia for example, most of the Virginia Department of Wildlife Resources's boat ramps see about 80 launches a day. This requires about 30-35 car-trailer parking spaces that each measure about 40 ft (12.19 m) by 10 ft (3.05 m). More land is required for the lanes to reach these parking space as well as a staging and turning area.
