= Stillaguamish Tribe of Indians =

Federally recognized tribe in Washington

Coordinates: 48.2233765°N 122.218185°W

Stillaguamish Tribe of Indians stuləgʷabš
- Federally-recognized Indian Tribe
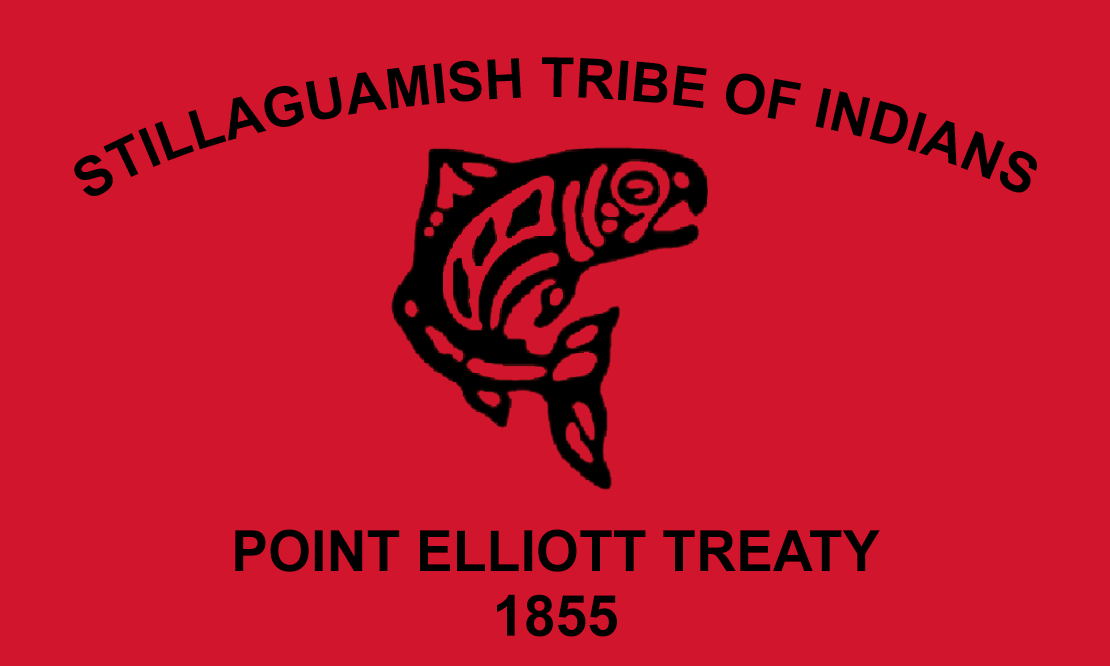
- Flag

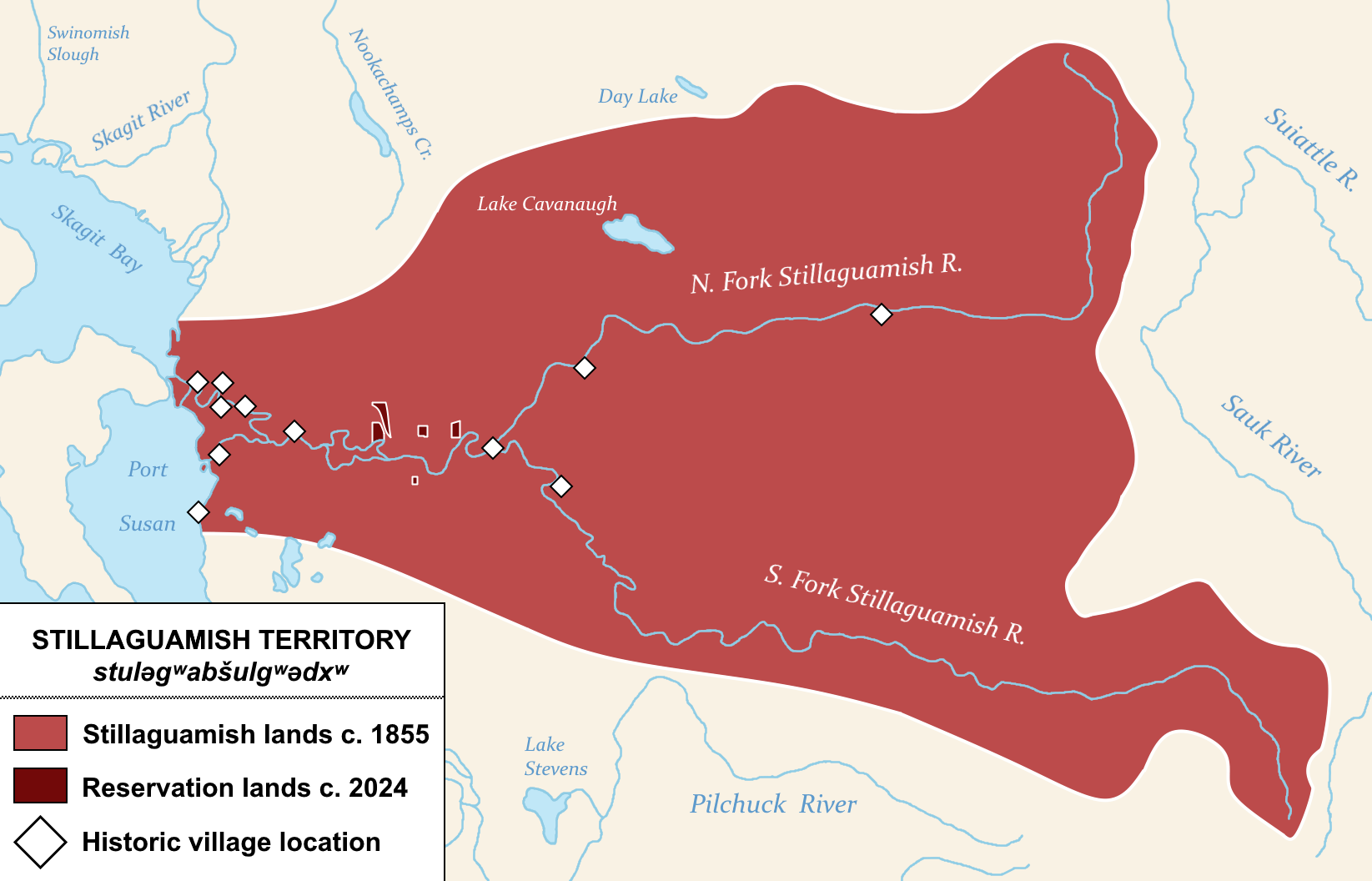
- A map of the Stillaguamish reservation overlaid the traditional territory of the Stillaguamish
- Founded: 1953
- Recognized: 1976
- Reservation established: 2014

Government
  - Body: Tribal Council/Board of Directors
  - Chairman: Eric White
  - Vice-Chairman: Kadi Bizyaye

Population (2026)
  - Total: 400

The Stillaguamish Tribe of Indians (Lushootseed: stuləgʷabš), formerly known as the Stillaguamish Tribe of Washington, is a federally recognized tribe of Stillaguamish people located in Snohomish County, Washington, United States. They are descended from the aboriginal Stillaguamish, listed on the Treaty of Point Elliot as the Stoluck-wa-mish River Tribe.

Although the Stillaguamish had existed for thousands of years prior, the Stillaguamish Tribe of Indians was founded on January 31, 1953, when the tribe ratified its constitution. The tribe petitioned for federal recognition in 1974, which they received two years later in 1976. In 2014, the tribe was granted a reservation.

The Stillaguamish Tribe is governed by the Stillaguamish Tribal Council, which carries out the administrative duties of the tribe. The tribe operates several businesses and services, both on and off the reservation.

== Name ==
The name "Stillaguamish" is an anglicization of their Lushootseed endonym, stuləgʷabš. The Lushootseed name means "people of the river," from the root word stuləkʷ meaning "river" and the suffix =abš meaning "people." The name stuləgʷabš is a drainage term, referring not to a central village but to all the people living along the Stillaguamish River.

== History ==
In 1855, the Stillaguamish were party to the Treaty of Point Elliott, alongside many other Puget Sound peoples. The Stillaguamish were listed on the treaty as the Stoluck-wa-mish River Tribe. Although the treaty promised the establishment of a Stillaguamish reservation, one was not established until 2014. For this reason, many Stillaguamish remained in their traditional homelands, unrecognized and off reservation lands.

On January 31, 1953, the Stillaguamish Tribe of Washington wrote and approved their constitution, which established a democratically elected six-member tribal council.

In 1974, the tribe petitioned for federal recognition, which was achieved on October 27, 1976.

The Stillaguamish Reservation was established in 2014 and was composed of 64 acres (26 ha) of land. From 2011 to 2026, the tribe purchased 2,000 acres (810 ha) of land along the Stillaguamish River to restore tidal habitats.

== Government ==
The administrative duties of the Stillaguamish Tribe are performed by the Stillaguamish Tribal Council, also called the board of directors. The tribal council is composed of six popularly-elected members, including a chairman, Vice-chairman, Treasurer, Secretary, and two additional members.

As of September 2024, the membership of the Stillaguamish Tribal Council is as follows:

- Chairman: Eric White
- Vice Chairman: Kadi Bizyayeva
- Secretary: Gary Tatro
- Treasurer: Joshua Wells
- Jeremy Smith
- Stacy White

== Language ==
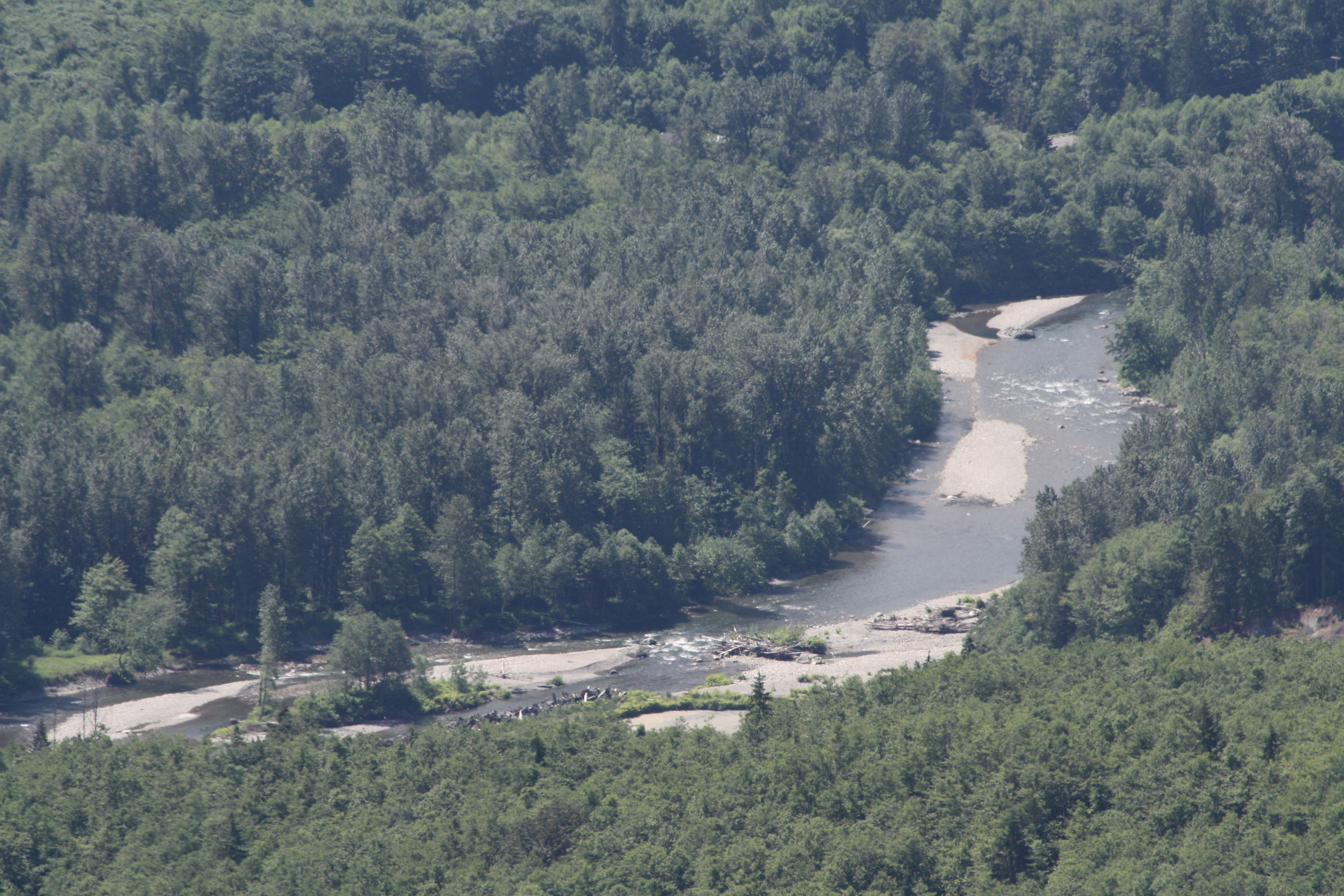
The Stillaguamish River, the namesake and traditional homeland of the Stillaguamish Tribe

The language of the Stillaguamish Tribe is Lushootseed, a Coast Salish language spoken by many different tribes throughout the Puget Sound region. Today, English is the more-commonly spoken language by members of the tribe, although the tribe is working to revitalize the language. The Cultural Resources Department of the tribe manages the tribe's cultural elements, including language.

== Economic development ==
The Stillaguamish Tribal Business Development Department develops and works in partnership with the board of directors for the tribe's businesses. Businesses operated by the tribe include River Rock Tobacco & Fuel and the Angel of the Winds Casino Resort, all located in Arlington.
