= Stanwood High School =

Location
- 7400 272nd Street NW; Stanwood, Washington; United States; 48°14′31″N 122°19′59″W

Information
- Type: Public
- Established: 1971
- School district: Stanwood-Camano School District
- Principal: Mike Washington
- Faculty: 57.80 (on FTE basis)
- Grades: 9 to 12
- Enrollment: 1,362 (2023-2024)
- Student to teacher ratio: 23.56
- Colors: Red, Gray & White
- Athletics conference: WIAA District 1 Wesco
- Sports: Football, Swim, Soccer, Volleyball, Cross Country, Wrestling, Basketball, Track and Field, Tennis, Cheer
- Mascot: Spartans
- Rivals: Arlington (Stilly Cup)
- Yearbook: Esaches
- Website: https://shs.stanwood.wednet.edu/

Stanwood High School is a public high school in the Stanwood-Camano School District, located in the city of Stanwood, Washington, about 50 miles (80 km) north of Seattle. The school originally opened in 1971, and underwent a full reconstruction that ended in 2021. As of the 2024-2025 school year, Stanwood High School's 63-acre (25 ha) campus serves 1,389 students from grades nine through twelve.

== History ==
The Stanwood school district began having high school courses at the elementary school building in 1910, and the high school got its own building in 1914. After the East Stanwood and Warm Beach districts consolidated into the Stanwood school district, the district itself was renamed the Twin City School District, and the high school was renamed too. At some point the high school reverted to its original name.

== Academics and programs ==
As of the 2024-2025 school year, Stanwood High School provides 16 different Advanced Placement (AP) courses for students to take. Average class sizes for all courses offered are around 23 students each class, with 70% of students in attendance for over 90% of the school year, as reported in 2024.

== Athletics ==
Stanwood competes in class 3A in the Washington Interscholastic Activities Association (WIAA). They are a member of the WesCo Athletic Conference in District 1.

The school offers various sports to students over the fall, winter, and spring sports seasons, including: baseball, golf, soccer, track, softball, tennis, basketball, wrestling, swim, competitive cheer, football, cross country and volleyball.

Stanwood teams have competed in the state tournament numerous times, earning placements from football, girls' basketball, boys' basketball, girls' soccer, as well as volleyball. The figure below illustrates the years and place in state received in state tournaments:

Stanwood High School State Tournament Placements
=== Sport ===	=== Year(s) ===	=== Place in State ===
Football	1973	2nd
Girls' Basketball	1993, 1995, 2018, 2022, 2023	7th, 7th, 5th, 6th, 4th
Boys' Basketball	1974, 1976, 2001, 2002, 2014, 2017	7th, 6th, 6th, 6th, 6th, 4th
Girls' Soccer	2006	2nd
Volleyball	1993	6th

== Facility and history ==
The high school opened in 1971, and was originally built with a "California-style" campus requiring access from the outside. Renovations in 1980, 1993, and 2001 have expanded the high school, but overcrowding had forced the use of portable classrooms in recent years.

In 2017, a $147.5 million bond was approved for the construction of a new, three-story school building to replace the old one. Construction of the new building began in 2018 and lasted until early 2021.

The official mascot of Stanwood High School is the Spartans.

== Students and faculty ==
In 2025, the student body stands at 1,389 enrollees. Of the enrolled student body, over 75 percent reported as White, 13 percent of students reported as Hispanic or Latino, while 5.3 percent of students reported as two or more races. Remaining, Native American, Black or African American, Asian, and Native Hawaiian or Pacific Islander each had less than five percent of students who were this race or ethnicity. There were 71 teachers who worked at Stanwood High School in the 2023-2024 year.

== Notable alumni ==
- T. J. Oshie, right wing for the Washington Capitals, USA Olympian in the 2014 Winter Olympics, and Champion of the 2018 Stanley Cup Final,
