= Skagit Station =

Transport hub in Mount Vernon, Washington

Skagit Station Mount Vernon, WA
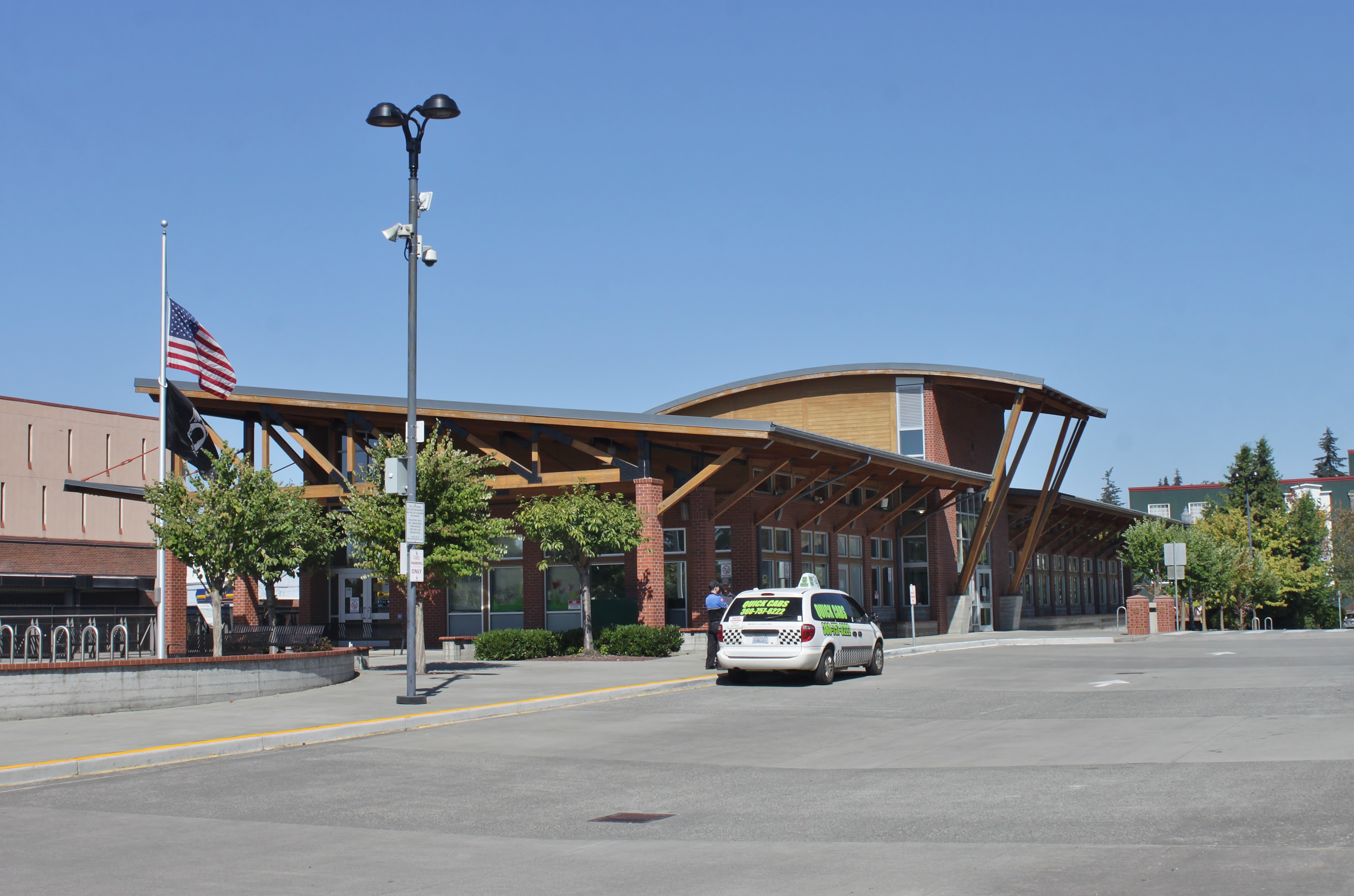

General information
- Location: 105 East Kincaid Street; Mount Vernon, Washington; United States
- Coordinates: 48°25′06″N 122°20′05″W
- Owner: Skagit Transit
- Line: BNSF Bellingham Subdivision
- Platforms: 1 side platform
- Tracks: 1
- Train operators: Amtrak
- Bus stands: 8 local bus stands, 1 intercity bus stand
- Bus operators: Skagit Transit; Whatcom Transportation Authority; Island Transit; Greyhound Lines

Construction
- Parking: 50 long term spaces
- Accessible: Yes

Other information
- Station code: Amtrak: MVW

History
- Opened: 2004

Passengers
- FY 2025: 15,256 (Amtrak)

Services
Preceding station	Amtrak	Following station
Stanwood toward Eugene	Amtrak Cascades	Bellingham toward Vancouver, British Columbia
Location

Skagit Station is a multimodal transportation hub in Mount Vernon, Washington, United States served by Amtrak trains; Greyhound intercity buses; and Skagit Transit, Whatcom Transportation Authority and Island Transit local buses. Commuter buses to Everett Station provide onward connection to Sound Transit, Everett Transit and Community Transit services. The facility at 105 East Kincaid Street was built in 2004 to replace the former Amtrak station at 725 College Way, which is currently used as a yard office by BNSF Railway.

== Boardings and alightings ==
Year	2011	2012	2013	2014	2015	2016	2017
Total	18,747	18,561	16,719	18,225	18,193	18,319	17,776
YOY Difference	-	-186	-1,842	1,506	-32	126	-543
YOY Difference %	-	-0.99%	-9.92%	9.01%	-0.18%	0.70%	-3.05%
