= Everett Transit =

Local public transit operator in Washington state

- A battery electric bus at Everett Station
- Parent: City of Everett
- Founded: December 1, 1969
- Ceased operation: April 1, 2027 (planned)
- Headquarters: Everett Station; 3201 Smith Avenue; Everett, Washington
- Locale: Everett, Washington, U.S.
- Service type: Bus service, paratransit
- Routes: 10
- Hubs: Everett Station; College Station; Mall Station
- Fleet: 43 transit buses, 24 paratransit buses
- Annual ridership: 1,820,550 (2025)
- Fuel type: Electric battery, diesel–electric hybrid
- Director: Mike Schmieder
- Annual budget: $46,725,591 (2026)
- Employees: 161 (2026)
- Website: everetttransit.org
System map (2026)

Everett Transit is a public transit system that serves the city of Everett, Washington, United States. It is a city department that operates 10 local bus routes and paratransit primarily within Everett, part of the Seattle metropolitan area. The rest of Snohomish County is served by Community Transit and Sound Transit. The agencies share a hub at Everett Station, the city's central rail and bus facility; Everett Transit also serves other hubs at Everett Community College and Everett Mall. The bus fleet is primarily battery electric buses and diesel–electric hybrids. Everett Transit carried 1.8 million total passengers in 2025.

The first transit system in Everett was a private streetcar company that formed in 1893 and was later owned by the Puget Sound International Railway and Power Company. A bus system replaced the streetcars in stages between 1922 and 1932 and was sold to form Everett City Lines in 1939. The company was bought out by the city government in 1969 after a ballot measure to save the system and create Everett Transit. The city's voters rejected attempts to form a countywide transit system in the 1970s, which later became Community Transit and excluded Everett from its boundaries.

The two agencies remained separate and discussed a merger or consolidation several times since the 1970s. Merger discussions resumed between Everett Transit and Community Transit in the late 2010s due to the city's financial issues, but were paused during the COVID-19 pandemic. An interlocal agreement was announced in September 2026 and approved in November. Everett Transit is scheduled to cease operations on April 1, 2027, and the city will be annexed into Community Transit. Under the terms of the interlocal agreement, Community Transit will purchase the assets of Everett Transit and increase service within the city between 2028 and 2031.

== History ==
=== Predecessors and private operators ===
The first transit service in Everett was a streetcar system that was conceived for real estate development in 1892, prior to the city's incorporation. The Everett Land Company received several proposals for streetcar systems and awarded franchises to three entrepreneurs who sought to construct separate lines that would form a seven-mile (11 km) network. Delivery of the streetcars began in January 1893 and construction commenced in March, traveling south from a smelter on Monte Cristo Avenue towards Downtown Everett. The final rails were laid in late June, with the system reaching Lowell. The streetcar system opened on July 3, 1893, with an inaugural ride on Hewitt Avenue for the city's elected leaders and prominent citizens. An estimated 2,600 people rode Everett's streetcars the following day to celebrate the Independence Day holiday.

The Everett Land Company attempted to sell its utilities and transportation subsidiary, later named the Everett Railway & Light Company, to the city government in 1894 amid financial issues. A ballot measure to fund a municipal bond to purchase the utility and streetcar systems was defeated in a landslide by voters. The company continued to operate the streetcar system and expanded it over the following decade while replacing the existing tracks, railcars, and other infrastructure. A loop serving the Monte Cristo Hotel opened in May 1901 and was followed by double-tracked lines on Hewitt Avenue and Colby Avenue by 1903. The streetcars were originally painted in a red and yellow livery, but were changed to be solely yellow in 1904 to resist corrosion. The entire system, which spanned 14 miles (23 km), was leased to the Puget Sound International Railway and Power Company, a subsidiary of Stone & Webster, in September 1907 for a term of 999 years. Stone & Webster also acquired the Seattle–Everett Interurban Railway, which opened in May 1910 and was integrated into the city's streetcar system, and later sold its water utility to the Everett city government.

The railway company announced in April 1922 that it would purchase a fleet of motor buses for use in newly developed neighborhoods rather than expand the streetcar system. They made their debut on December 1, 1922, replacing the Colby Avenue streetcar line at a frequency of 7.5 minutes. Everett became one of the first major cities in the United States to retire most of its streetcars in favor of buses, which could use curbside stops and allowed for streets to be widened for automobiles. The Hewitt Avenue line ceased operation on April 5, 1923, and the remaining lines were amalgamated into a single route on Broadway that served Lowell and the Weyerhaeuser sawmills in Delta. The final streetcars on the Broadway line were removed on March 1, 1932, and replaced by new bus routes. The interurban was merged into the North Coast Lines alongside local buses and ceased service in February 1939 amid a decline in ridership attributed to competition from automobiles.

The Everett division of North Coast Lines was acquired by the Manning Transport Company on July 1, 1939, and renamed to Everett City Lines. Manning, which also operated public buses in Great Falls and Glasgow, Montana, outfitted the system with new buses and lowered the fare to 5 cents. Manning sold Everett City Lines to National City Lines (NCL), a national conglomerate that operated buses in 36 cities, in April 1946. The company acquired two other operators in Snohomish County the following year and were granted franchises to run intercity buses to Mukilteo and other cities. By 1953, the Everett City Lines system had thirteen routes that covered Everett, Lowell, and unincorporated areas as far south as Silver Lake. NCL announced the sale of their Everett operations to Clyde Hammond, a former driver who also owned bus systems in Wenatchee and Walla Walla, in February 1961. Hammond's company, named the Everett Bus System, formally took over operations on March 9, 1961, and moved the headquarters to Lowell.

=== City takeover ===
Historical bus ridership
Year	Ridership	%±	Ref.
1975	758,000	—N/a	
1980	1,667,086	119.9%	
1985	1,381,523	-17.1%	
1990	1,480,351	7.2%	
1995	1,735,118	17.2%	
2000	1,493,189	-13.9%	
2005	1,957,478	31.1%	
2010	2,289,729	17%	
2015	1,944,871	-15.1%	
2020	807,733	-58.5%	
2025	1,734,301	114.7%	

After eight years of operations, Hammond approached the city government in early 1969 to seek a buyout of the Everett Bus System due to its ongoing financial and maintenance issues. The system had lost $10,000 (equivalent to $70,558 in 2025 dollars) the previous year and had a fleet of 16 buses that were all over 20 years old and required replacements, which were estimated to cost $250,000 (equivalent to $1.68 million in 2025 dollars). The city government commissioned a study that recommended several options, including outright acquisition, contracting a new company, and a lease-back agreement with Hammond. The full acquisition of the existing buses and other assets was endorsed by the city council, who approved a ballot measure that would levy a household and business tax to fund a transit system. Everett voters approved the acquisition ballot measure on November 4, 1969, along with the 0.45 percent household tax and 0.2 percent business tax to fund the transit system. The city purchased all 16 buses in the Everett Bus System fleet for $36,398 in late November as a temporary measure until a grant to buy new buses was approved.

Everett Transit formally took over the bus system on December 1, 1969, and carried 5,576 total passengers on its first day. Within a few months, the route network was expanded to new areas of the city and later runs were added to extend service to midnight; a commuter bus for the Boeing plant ran until 1:45 a.m. Four used buses were purchased from Oceanside, California, to allow several of the oldest Everett Bus System buses to be retired; the entire fleet was painted in bright shades of blue, green, and white. Everett Transit began to withdraw service from some neighborhoods in 1970 to reduce operating costs and were granted a portion of the motor vehicle excise tax collected by the state government the following year. By 1971, bus service had an average deficit of $2,500 (equivalent to $15,203 in 2025 dollars) each month and some trips were cut. The city government was awarded $379,000 (equivalent to $2.21 million in 2025 dollars) in federal grants in 1972 to purchase 18 buses to replace its entire transit fleet and install benches and shelters at bus stops. The new buses were put into service the following year, allowing the former Everett Bus System fleet to be retired. The agency also adopted a computerized dispatch system for buses, which would be able to switch between routes as needed.

A larger transit system that would serve Everett and adjacent cities in Snohomish County was studied in the early 1970s and formally proposed in a 1974 plan created by the Snohomish County Transit Authority (Sno-Tran). The agency proposed a countywide 0.3 percent sales tax to fund a bus system that would absorb Everett Transit and comprise 37 routes with local and regional express service by 1980. The ballot measure was defeated by 52 percent of voters on September 17, with heavy opposition from within Everett amid a small turnout. A second attempt in the November general election was also rejected after a poor performance among Everett voters; a majority of the city council had also endorsed a "no" vote. The proposal was supported in southwestern Snohomish County and returned in June 1976 as a public transportation benefit area that excluded the Everett city limits. It was approved and established a new transit agency, later named Community Transit, that would serve the rest of Snohomish County and have limited service to Everett for transfers.

The monthly household tax used to fund Everett Transit service was increased to its maximum rate of $1 (equivalent to $5.00 in 2025 dollars) by the city council in November 1975 to address a financial deficit that could not be covered by the general fund. The bus system had carried 750,000 passengers over the year and had a fare of 20 cents, which covered about one-fifth of operating costs. The household tax was reduced to 75 cents after the city received an operations grant from the federal government, but was raised again to $1 in January 1978 to cover increased costs. In September 1978, voters in Everett approved a 0.3 sales tax to fund the transit system as a replacement for the household and business tax. With their new funding source, Everett Transit began to restore service and increased bus frequency to every 30 minutes on all routes during peak periods. They also began to accept fares transfers with Community Transit, but schedules for the two systems often did not allow for timed connections or created duplicated service. Ridership on Everett Transit increased to 956,000 in 1974 during the global oil crisis and decreased by 21 percent the following year. Everett Transit acquired three trolley replica buses in 1985 to use on a circulator route in Downtown Everett and at events. They failed to attract riders and were retired from service in 1989 due to their inability to be used on regular routes.

=== Downtown station and new service ===
An articulated bus that entered service with Everett Transit in 2000

The main transfer point in Downtown Everett for the Everett Transit system was moved to the Everpark parking garage at Hewitt Avenue and Hoyt Avenue in August 1981. It was expected to handle additional traffic from new bus routes while a permanent transit center was built at a different site. Community Transit also moved to the site in May 1984 after their lease at a nearby Greyhound bus terminal was canceled. The transfer point was renovated to add seating areas and a customer service center later that year. The two agencies agreed to work on plans for a permanent transit center in Everett that would also be served by a future commuter train. The train would be part of a regional transit plan authored in conjunction with Community Transit, King County Metro, and Pierce Transit. The state legislature had convened a joint policy committee on regional transit in 1990 that resulted in the creation of Sound Transit, a new regional agency that would build the rail system.

To accommodate the expansion of the Boeing Everett Factory for the 777 program, the company agreed to purchase buses for local transit agencies who provide commuter service. Everett Transit received three buses as part of the agreement in 1992 and began service to Mukilteo from the factory area. The agency also modified its service to the waterfront in 1996 to add a new route to serve Naval Station Everett, a new military installation. A transportation referendum passed by Washington state voters in November 1998 allowed Everett Transit and Yakima Transit to collect motor vehicle excise taxes, which were previously limited to public transportation benefit areas like Community Transit. The motor vehicle excise tax was revoked by the state legislature in 2000 after Washington voters approved Initiative 695. The agency received five articulated buses—its first high-capacity vehicles—in April 2000 as part of an order that was shared with King County Metro. The buses were also considered for a potential commuter route to Downtown Seattle or a contract to operate Sound Transit Express in Snohomish County. Community Transit was instead awarded the Sound Transit Express contract.

On February 4, 2002, the city opened Everett Station, a multimodal transit hub east of Downtown Everett near Pacific Avenue that would replace the Everpark transit center. The station was built for regional use and was initially used by Everett Transit and Community Transit buses. They were later joined by Amtrak and Sounder trains as well as Sound Transit Express and Greyhound buses. Everett Transit also moved its customer service center to the new facility, which also housed offices, community spaces, and classrooms for local colleges. Community Transit began to withdraw its local service within Everett city limits in February 2003 to reduce operating costs and switched to limited-stop service that converged on Everett Station and other hubs. Under the new policy, passengers would only be picked up or dropped off at hubs or regional destinations in Everett, except during rush hours. Local trips were shifted to restructured Everett Transit routes, which carried 50 percent more riders during the first week of the service change and a year-over-year increase of 34 percent from May 2002 to May 2003.

Through the early 2000s, Everett Transit had depleted most of its reserve funds to maintain service levels and make up for a shortfall in sales tax revenue. The reserve funds had been at $5 million (equivalent to $8.67 million in 2025 dollars) at the beginning of the decade but was projected to run out by July 2005. A 14 percent reduction in service, primarily on weekends, was enacted in August 2003 and followed by proposals to find new revenue sources, including a potential fare increase. A referendum to increase the transit sales tax by 0.3 percent was placed on the September 2004 primary election ballot by the city council. The sales tax increase was approved by 57 percent of voters and took effect in January 2005. Everett Transit began to roll back its earlier cuts in November 2004 and began to expand the following year with the addition of service on major holidays and additional trips on weekdays and weekends. In September 2006, the agency overhauled its fare system and increased the base fare to $1 for adults on fixed bus routes to offset rising fuel costs. By the end of the year, Everett Transit had surpassed 2 million total passengers for the first time in its history.

=== Budget trouble and electrification ===
Everett Transit and Community Transit buses at South Everett Freeway Station

Community Transit and Everett Transit signed an agreement in December 2007 to jointly develop and fund a bus rapid transit line on State Route 99 and Evergreen Way. The line would be managed by Community Transit, who would receive sales tax revenue from Everett Transit to cover operational costs within the city limits and a one-time payment for construction costs. Everett Transit also agreed to operate more service to unincorporated areas immediately adjacent to the city. The 17-mile (27 km) Swift Blue Line opened in November 2009 and travels from Shoreline to Everett Station with several intermediate stops within the city. It eliminated a transfer at the city limits that had to be made between systems. Everett Transit also reorganized its bus system to accommodate Swift and launch new services, including a commuter route from Naval Station Everett to a support complex in Marysville; the agency also took over a Community Transit commuter route that had served Mukilteo and the Boeing Everett Factory. The new network drew complaints from passengers due to missed transfers and confusing labels; several routes were modified in March 2010 as a result. An additional agreement in 2010 allowed the two agencies to expand their range of paratransit service, with Everett Transit able to serve areas of Marysville and Mill Creek.

The economic fallout from the Great Recession caused a decline in sales tax revenue that affected most of the transit systems in the Puget Sound region. Everett Transit reduced its service on several routes in 2011 to fill a 10 percent budget shortfall, while Community Transit had eliminated all service on Sundays and holidays. Further cuts to Everett Transit service, including the elimination of Marysville service, were made in 2012 after reserve funds had been depleted over a two-year period; a fare increase was also adopted and took effect in January 2013. The agency drew on its reserve funds to avoid a budget deficit in the following years but forecast a shortfall by 2020 that would require further cuts to service or another fare increase. Everett Transit was also required to fund a $1.1 million (equivalent to $1.39 million in 2025 dollars) share of the costs to upgrade the regional ORCA card system. The agency's first battery electric buses, funded through a grant from the federal government, entered service in 2018 to offset increased costs for diesel fuel. They were placed on route 7, a frequent route on Broadway and Evergreen Way, and marked the beginning of a push to electrify half of the bus fleet by 2022. Another federal grant program funded 22 improved bus stops on Broadway with curb bulbs, bicycle racks, and artwork.

Everett Transit raised its adult fare to $2 in July 2019 and also adopted a low-income fare of $1.50 for qualifying households enrolled in the ORCA Lift program. The agency suspended fare collection and adopted social distancing rules during the early stage of the COVID-19 pandemic in March 2020. They also received $3 million in emergency funding from the federal CARES Act to offset the shortfall in fare revenue until collection resumed on July 1. By the end of the year, ridership on fixed bus routes had declined by 55 percent and paratransit use was reduced by 67 percent. Sunday service was also removed but was restored in March 2021, followed by a return to frequent service on route 7 later that year. Two routes—one on the city's waterfront and another connecting Mukilteo to the Boeing factory—remained suspended due to low ridership. Everett Transit was the first transit system in the Puget Sound region to recover to their pre-pandemic ridership numbers, carrying 1.8 million passengers in 2024—a 32 percent from the previous year. A directive from the mayor in October 2025 converted route 12 on Casino Road into a fare-free bus in response to the closure of a Fred Meyer store, which limited grocery options for local residents.

Everett Transit adopted a long-range plan in 2026 that called for a 25 percent increase in bus service by 2045. A financial forecast within the plan found that the agency would be able to maintain their present service through 2038 but would need an additional 0.3 percent in sales tax revenue, to be collected after voter approval, to increase service. The plan also proposed new service to McCollum Park, a microtransit zone in areas without bus service, and frequency improvements on some routes.

== Consolidation with Community Transit ==
The service areas and route networks of Community Transit (blue) and Everett Transit (red)

Attempts to consolidate or merge Everett Transit into the countywide Community Transit system have been proposed since the formation of Sno-Tran and the later public transportation benefit area for Snohomish County in the 1970s. The two agencies discussed a merger in 1980 but Everett Transit were unwilling to relinquish local control over service, which ran at a higher frequency at the time. A proposal to allow Everett Transit to use the state's pool of motor vehicle excise taxes, normally allocated to county-level systems, was initially opposed by Community Transit and created animosity between the agencies that later cooled. The two agencies formed a joint committee in July 1984 to study a merger, annexation, or another form of closer cooperation to reduce service duplication and improve connections. The committee's negotiations did not result in a merger proposal.

The two agencies adopted resolutions to cooperate on future transit improvements, including a sales tax measure and planning for a regional light rail system, in a joint meeting with Sno-Tran in June 1988. Community Transit's board of directors endorsed another study into a consolidated system later that year but did not seek approval from Everett Transit. Sno-Tran authorized a study in 1990 for an outside consultant to investigate the benefits of a consolidated countywide transit system. The study found that the two systems had little duplication in their service and would still require their entire staff to maintain a consolidated transit system, but a higher sales tax rate in Everett would collect up to $80 million more over a 10-year period.

A separate study in 1991 from the state government into local transit operations across Washington recommended a merger of the two systems in order to comply with the goals of the Growth Management Act. A bill introduced to the Washington State Legislature in 1992 and passed by the State House would have merged Community Transit and Everett Transit after a local referendum. It was tabled by the State Senate's transportation committee. A second attempt in the 1994 session, co-sponsored by transportation committee chair Ruth Fisher, was passed by the State House's transportation committee but died in the rules committee. Everett leaders had lobbied against the bill, which would have enabled the Snohomish County Council to place a ballot measure to decide the merger issue. A third bill in the 2000 session, proposed in response to funding cuts after Initiative 695, asked the two agencies to merge or have Everett subsidize the cost of in-city service provided by Community Transit. The bill did not receive a reading in the transportation committee after it was blocked by Fisher.

Community Transit continued to seek a merger or annexation of Everett into its system, which would have required a vote to join the public transportation benefit area and enact a 0.6 percent sales tax. After the 2000 legislative session and the loss of motor vehicle excise tax revenue for both agencies, a new round of discussion on the merger issue began. The two agencies hired separate outside consultants to study plans to create a new transit operator that would absorb both systems. Community Transit's study found that a consolidated system would save $200,000 in annual costs and increase bus service within Everett by 18 percent through improved connections and routing. In their study, Everett Transit found that the consolidation would save funding but dilute local control; in response, Everett mayor Ed Hansen supported the idea of a joint operating agreement to coordinate between the two systems instead of a full merger. The two agencies remained separate and a merger proposal was considered but not forwarded by a regional transportation panel organized by the Puget Sound Regional Council in 2006.

Everett mayor Cassie Franklin and Community Transit CEO Ric Ilgenfritz sign the city's annexation agreement

Budget issues in the late 2010s and the COVID-19 pandemic prompted the two agencies to revisit talks on consolidation. Everett Transit had originally anticipated a budget deficit by late 2020, but received federal aid during the pandemic that allowed it to maintain current service levels into the 2030s without further growth. A joint study on consolidation was funded in December 2021, based on the results of a survey of Everett Transit riders that had been conducted earlier that year. The study was completed in 2023 and proposed an expanded system with better frequencies and five new routes to serve Everett and surrounding areas. The consolidation would require Everett to raise its transit sales tax by 0.6 percent to match the rate that Community Transit uses in the rest of Snohomish County. The consolidation proposal was deferred for two years amid a major restructure of bus service for Community Transit to prepare for the Link light rail system's extension into Snohomish County. In 2025, the state legislature passed a law that allowed for Community Transit to annex Everett with a city council vote and an interlocal agreement instead of a full referendum.

Public discussion of the consolidation proposal resumed in April 2026 and was followed by an open house with representatives from both agencies. An interlocal agreement between Community Transit and the City of Everett was published in September 2026 and was followed by public hearings. The Everett City Council formally approved the interlocal agreement with a unanimous vote on November 4 and was followed by the Community Transit board of directors on November 5. Under the agreement, Everett will be annexed into the public transportation benefit area on April 1, 2027, and service changes would begin in 2028 with a goal of increasing city service by 50 percent within three years. The assets of Everett Transit, including ownership of Everett Station, are to be sold to Community Transit for $42.5 million alongside other payments. All employees would be transferred to the agency or another city department; paratransit service for current users in Everett would remain in place with the same eligibility criteria. Without a consolidation, Everett Transit had planned to submit a ballot measure in 2030 to increase the sales tax by 0.3 percent for a 25 percent increase in service. The local chapter of the Amalgamated Transit Union, which represents the agency's bus operators and other employees, protested the consolidation plan at several events and city council meetings. The union's existing collective bargaining agreement is planned to remain during the transition of consolidated operations with Community Transit, who would begin to bargain for a new combined agreement with their own chapter of the Amalgamated Transit Union. The Everett city government subsequently announced that a $33 million portion of the funds it is scheduled to receive from Community Transit through the sale of transit assets will be allocated towards a new baseball stadium.

== Services ==
A fare-free shuttle bus for the 2026 FIFA World Cup at Boxcar Park

Everett Transit covers 34 square miles (88 km^{2}) in the city limits and a limited area in surrounding unincorporated Snohomish County and Mukilteo. The agency has 10 fixed routes, most of which operate seven days per week at frequencies that vary based on service levels, typically every 30 or 60 minutes. Route 7, the busiest route in the system, runs every 15 minutes on weekdays, 20 minutes on Saturdays, and 30 minutes on Sundays and holidays. Route 18 is the only route limited to peak hours on weekdays and provides commuter service from Downtown Everett to the Boeing Everett Factory and Mukilteo's ferry terminal. The agency's paratransit service is available within the entire Everett city limits for residents with disabilities or over the age of 65. The span of the service exceeds the minimum levels set for paratransit service under the Americans with Disabilities Act.

In 2025, the agency carried 1,734,301 total passenger trips on fixed routes and 86,249 trips on paratransit. This includes 8,000 trips on shuttle buses for special events in Downtown Everett and the waterfront that are provided fare-free. Everett Transit operates shuttles to downtown for Sorticulture in June, a waterfront concert series in July and August, and to Legion Park for an annual Independence Day fireworks celebration. The event shuttles at four FIFA World Cup watch parties, held on the waterfront at Boxcar Park in June 2026, carried 5,000 passengers. Everett Transit has the smallest annual ridership among services in the Seattle metropolitan area; in 2024, it became the first in the region to have ridership surpass its figures from prior to the COVID-19 pandemic. The agency's ridership had previously peaked at 2.6 million total boardings in 2008.

=== Fares ===
As of 2026, full adult fares on fixed routes and paratransit are set at $2. These are paid with cash or the ORCA card, a regional smart card system that also accepts contactless payments from cards and mobile wallets. Reduced fares are available for low-income passengers enrolled in the ORCA Lift program as well as senior citizens and people with disabilities. Fares for passengers under the age of 19 have been free since 2022 through a state program funded by the Climate Commitment Act. The ORCA card also handles transfers between Everett Transit buses and other agencies in the system; regional day and monthly passes are also accepted. Everett Transit was among the first agencies in the region to remove its paper transfer system, doing so in 2006.

== Facilities ==
Everett Station, the main hub for Everett Transit and a multimodal transfer facility

The main transfer hub in the city is Everett Station, a multimodal train and bus station east of Downtown Everett that opened in 2002. It is served by Everett Transit, Community Transit, Island Transit, and Skagit Transit buses. Sound Transit operates its Sound Transit Express buses and Sounder commuter trains from the station to Seattle. Intercity Amtrak trains and buses also stop at Everett Station. The station building houses the administrative offices for Everett Transit, a large waiting room, and the agency's separate customer service center. The building and bus bays are owned by the city government. Everett Station has 1,067 parking stalls in five lots—four on the west side of the tracks are owned by the city government and one on the east side is owned by Sound Transit.

Everett Transit has two outlying hubs that it owns and operates. College Station, adjacent to the Everett Community College campus, has six bus bays and rest facilities for operators. It opened in March 2008 and was built for $1.7 million with a funding contribution from Sound Transit. Mall Station on the south side of the Everett Mall is served by several routes and opened in December 2025. It was relocated 500 feet (150 m) from a previous transit center that was built in 2005 and is planned to be redeveloped into a Topgolf by the mall's owners. Prior to the opening of Everett Station, the city's primary bus hub and customer service center had been adjacent to a Downtown Everett parking garage at Hewitt Avenue and Hoyt Avenue.

The operations and maintenance base for Everett Transit is located on the city's public services campus near Everett Station. It comprises two buildings on 2.4 acres (0.97 ha) of land and originally housed a trucking company until it was acquired for transit use in 1972. The base was determined to be too small to meet the projected needs of Everett Transit in 2025 and is planned to be replaced by a new facility. A study found three suitable locations for a potential base: near the existing city government shops; along the Snohomish River at an industrial center; or in the Lowell neighborhood. The facility would cost $75 million for the maintenance facility and $100 million for an operations center, with a site to be selected at a later date.

== Administration ==
Everett Transit is one of six transit operators in Washington state that are classified as city transit departments. The agency is a division of the Everett Transportation Services Department and is governed by the Everett City Council. Everett Transit comprises five divisions with 161 total employees who are overseen by the transit director, a position appointed by the mayor. The agency is headquartered at Everett Station, which also serves as the main hub for the system. Since 2024, the transit director has been former bus driver and operations manager Mike Schmieder.

As of 2026, Everett Transit has a budget of $46.7 million; its primary revenue source is a 0.6 percent sales tax that was approved by voters in 2004. The division's budget is an enterprise fund that does not receive revenue from the city's general fund; it also receives grants from the state and federal governments. A portion of Everett Transit's sales tax revenue is transferred to Community Transit to operate Swift Bus Rapid Transit service within Everett city limits. The agency directly operates its paratransit service instead of contracting with a private company. The 71 bus operators and 25 paratransit operators in Everett Transit are represented by the Amalgamated Transit Union Local 883.

== Fleet ==
Several Proterra battery electric buses in a storage lot after their retirement from Everett Transit

As of 2026, Everett Transit has a fleet of 43 transit buses for fixed routes and 24 cutaway buses for paratransit use. The entire active bus fleet comprises the Gillig Low Floor and its variants in lengths of 35 feet (11 m) and 40 feet (12 m); they have a seating capacity of between 31 and 40 passengers as well as two wheelchair spaces each. 24 buses in the fleet use electric batteries, while 8 are hybrid diesel–electric units and 11 are diesel-only. The electric buses have on-board batteries with a capacity of 444 kilowatt-hours and use wireless inductive chargers embedded into the pavement at hubs as well as wired chargers at its bus base. The diesel buses use renewable diesel derived from vegetable oils and animal fats. The paratransit fleet uses gasoline-powered minibuses based on the Ford E-450 chassis that can seat 10 passengers and have space for two wheelchairs. In 2025, Everett Transit consumed 1.28 million kilowatt-hours of electricity, over 210,000 US gallons (790,000 L) of diesel fuel, and 81,500 US gallons (309,000 L) of gasoline to power its buses.

The agency's buses are painted in a livery that comprises a red top and gray bottom. It was adopted in 2001 alongside a new logo that features a pilot wing with a red insignia marked by the letters "ET". The livery replaced an earlier white paint scheme that was primarily white with diagonal stripes in blue, green, and black; it was determined to be too similar to Community Transit and Sound Transit Express buses, which also use white liveries. The Everett Transit livery was used by Mattel in its Matchbox brand of die-cast toy vehicles in 2008 through a licensing agreement with the city government. The agency had requested a custom order for educational purposes but instead struck a licensing deal to add the toy bus to the Matchbox's retail lineup. The educational program also led to the installation of a retired bus inside the Imagine Children's Museum in Downtown Everett; the exhibit preserves the front of a bus that had been in a collision and was unable to be repaired.

Everett Transit was among the first transit providers in Washington state to adopt battery electric buses with the debut of four Proterra Catalyst E2 buses in 2018. The buses, each able to carry 31 seated passengers and 18 standees, were purchased with a $3.4 million grant from the federal government that also covered some of the charging infrastructure. The agency had planned to use an entirely zero-emissions fleet by 2028 and operated nine Proterra buses in 2023, when the manufacturer filed for Chapter 11 bankruptcy. Everett Transit announced plans in 2025 to sell its Proterra buses, contingent on a grant waiver from the Federal Transit Administration, due to the lack of support and parts to mitigate their high failure rate. To temporarily replace the Proterra fleet while awaiting electric buses from Gillig, the city council authorized the purchase of seven used diesel buses that would be refurbished and enter service. Everett Transit received a $10.1 million federal grant in 2025 to purchase nine hybrid diesel–electric buses to replace older vehicles in 2028. The agency also plans to purchase electric paratransit vehicles to meet its zero-emissions goal by 2039.
