= Ruth Fisher =

Ruth Fisher may refer to:

- Ruth Fisher (Six Feet Under), a character from the American TV series Six Feet Under
- Ruth Fisher (politician), former member of the Washington State Legislature
- Ruth Alice Fisher, British missionary to Uganda
- Ruth Anna Fisher, American historian, archivist, and teacher

== See also ==
- Ruth Fischer, Austrian and German communist
