= John O. Rudene =

American politician

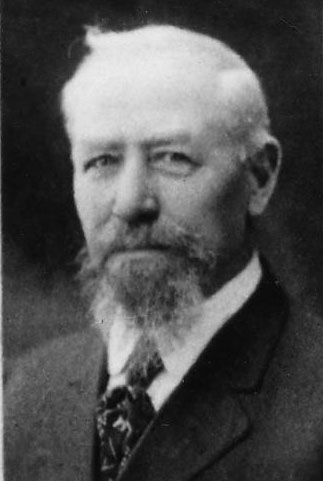
- Rudene in 1917

Member of the Washington House of Representatives for the 51st district
- In office 1905–1913; 1917–1919

Personal details
- Born: August 1850 Sweden
- Died: December 30, 1930 (aged 80) Mount Vernon, Washington, United States
- Party: Republican

John Oscar Rudene (August 1850 – December 30, 1930) was an American politician in the state of Washington. He served in the Washington House of Representatives. Rudene Road in Mount Vernon is named after him.
