= MVW =

MVW may refer to:

- Michael Vincent Waller, contemporary composer
- Man vs. Wild, a survival television series
- MVW, the IATA code for Skagit Regional Airport
- MVW, the station code for Mount Vernon (Amtrak station)
- Model-View-Whatever, a computer programming paradigm adopted by the AngularJS framework
