= Whatcom Transportation Authority =

Public transit system in Washington

Coordinates: 48°47′12″N 122°26′56″W

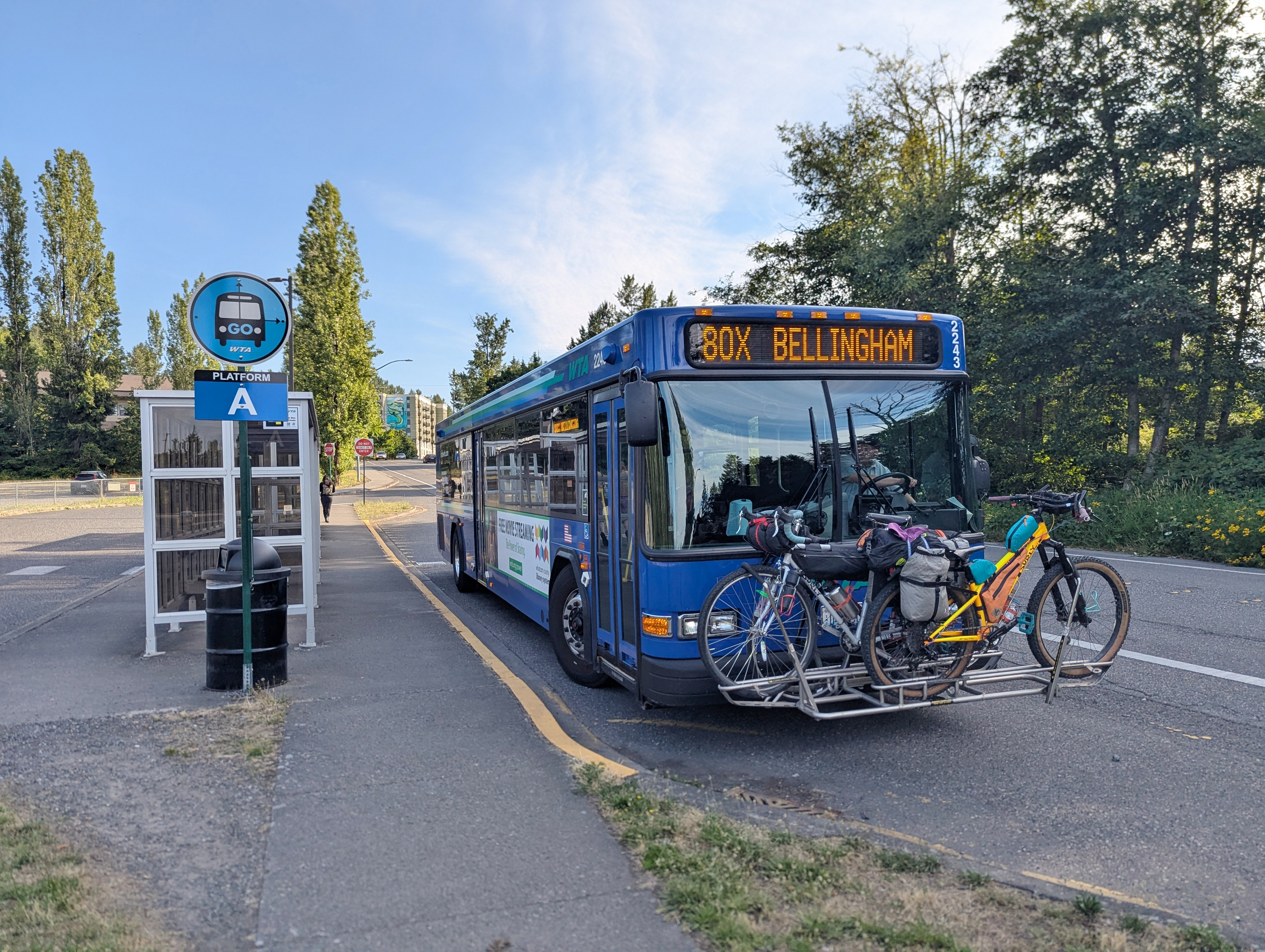
- A bus on Route 80X at Lincoln Creek Park and Ride
- Commenced operation: January 1, 1984
- Headquarters: 4011 Bakerview Spur, Bellingham, Washington
- Locale: Whatcom County, Washington
- Service type: Bus service, paratransit, vanpool
- Routes: 32
- Fleet: 68 buses, 61 paratransit vehicles, 18 vans
- Annual ridership: 3,938,351 (2025)
- General manager: Les Reardanz
- Annual budget: $55,266,081 (2026)
- Employees: 326 (2026)
- Website: www.ridewta.com

The Whatcom Transportation Authority (WTA) is the public transit authority of Whatcom County in northwestern Washington, based in the city of Bellingham. It provides bus service on 30 fixed routes, including four branded "Go Lines" with 15-minute frequencies on weekdays. In addition to bus service, WTA offers paratransit service and vanpool programs. The agency carried over 3.9 million passengers on all its services in 2025.

WTA is funded by a 0.6 percent sales tax within the Whatcom County public transportation benefit area (PTBA) and grants from the state and federal governments. Service began on January 1, 1984, using equipment bought from the Bellingham municipal transit system after a countywide authority was established the prior year. WTA initially comprised Bellingham and its immediate surroundings, but expanded to other cities in Whatcom County by 1995. The agency began running inter-county buses to Skagit County in 2005.

== History ==
A public transportation benefit area for Whatcom County was formed in August 1983 through an agreement between the City of Bellingham and county government. A conference of local political leaders had been convened three months earlier to address the need for a countywide transit system, which resulted in the agreement. The new system would initially serve Bellingham, Sudden Valley, and other areas to the east while excluding Ferndale and other populated areas of the county. The Whatcom Transportation Authority (WTA) name was adopted a month later and followed by a ballot measure for a 0.3 percent sales tax that was approved by voters in the November 1983 general election.

The new bus system would incorporate and contract with the municipal Bellingham Transit Department, which was funded by a similar 0.3 percent sales tax within city limits but not eligible for additional revenue from the state government's motor vehicle excise tax. The city government took over transit operations on October 1, 1971, from a private operator that was unable to continue funding their service. The city system was popular with local residents but increasing operating costs by the end of the 1970s led to cuts to routes and service. Bellingham had previously been served by streetcars between 1891 and 1938, when they were replaced by diesel buses after a period of decline due to the popularity of automobiles. The streetcars were then replaced by buses operated by a subsidiary of National City Lines and the later Satterlee Transit System, which had 12 buses and carried 1.3 million passengers in 1952.

WTA began service within Bellingham on January 1, 1984, through a $1.4 million contract to lease the municipal system's equipment and retain their drivers. By November, the existing 530 bus stops in the Bellingham Transit system were switched to a new blue design that was manufactured by inmates at the Washington State Penitentiary. In the first year, WTA carried 1.28 million passengers, compared to 1.17 million passengers on Bellingham Transit buses in 1983. The first major expansion of service to Sudden Valley was made in September 1985 alongside the debut of the agency's logo, decided through a public contest, and bus livery. In November 1988, voters in Ferndale, Lynden, and areas along State Route 539 (Guide Meridian) approved a ballot measure to join the WTA service area. The Ferndale vote passed by 65 percent, while Lynden and the Guide Meridian corridor had a narrower margin in favor. WTA ended its contract with the Bellingham Transit Department in 1992 and fully absorbed the former department's employees.

A referendum to expand service to four other areas of Whatcom County—including the Lummi Nation, Point Roberts, Everson, Nooksack, and Sumas, was held in March 1995. All four areas approved the referendum and were annexed into the WTA service area; they were initially served by dial-a-ride and demand-response service. A fleet of four replica trolley buses was purchased by WTA in 1998 to run on local routes in Bellingham, Lynden, Ferndale, Blaine, and Birch Bay. After the passage of Initiative 695 by state voters in 1999, which capped the motor vehicle excise tax used to fund local transit service, WTA made cuts to bus service and announced plans to pursue a sales tax increase. The sales tax was raised to 0.6 percent through a ballot measure that was approved by voters in March 2002.

WTA opened its new headquarters and maintenance facility in July 2002 after four years of construction. The campus spans 67,000 square feet (6,200 m^{2}) and includes administrative offices, maintenance garages, fuel stations, and parking; it consolidated seven rented facilities in Bellingham and cost $14.3 million to construct. WTA introduced its "Go Lines" on three corridors in August 2005 to promote areas with service at a frequency of every 15 minutes during the weekday. A month later, the County Connector system was launched by WTA with Skagit Transit and Island Transit using funding from the state government. The first route connected Bellingham to Mount Vernon with eight round trips on weekdays and four on Saturdays.

WTA reduced its service by 14 percent in 2010 due to reduced revenue during the Great Recession. A ballot measure to raise the sales tax by 0.2 percent was rejected by voters in April 2010 and led to the elimination of Sunday service. The city of Bellingham formed a transportation benefit district that was approved by voters there and funded a restoration of Sunday service beginning in June 2011. The agency restored their pre-2010 service in 2017; they responded to the COVID-19 pandemic in March 2020 by cutting 30 percent of service, which was then restored in June 2021. During the pandemic, WTA and the Port of Bellingham funded an emergency passenger ferry to connect Blaine with Point Roberts, which had become isolated due to restrictions on cross-border movement and the area's lack of road connections to the rest of the United States. The agency increased the fare for its fixed route services to $2 for adult passengers on September 1, 2026; the previous fare of $1 had been unchanged since 2008.

== Services ==
A WTA bus in the Bellingham Pride Parade

WTA serves 776 square miles (2,010 km^{2}) in western Whatcom County, which comprises seven incorporated cities and additional unincorporated areas. It has 32 fixed bus routes, rural flexible zones, on-demand paratransit, and vanpool services. The agency also operates higher-frequency service on its "Go Lines" and within the Western Washington University campus during the school year. In 2025, WTA carried a total of 3.9 million passengers on all its services, with 94.2 percent on its fixed routes. The busiest fixed route in 2022 was Route 331, which connects Bellingham Station to Cordata Station and is branded as the Gold Line. The flexible zones are rural areas with limited demand-responsive services that are provided once or twice a week with advance reservations.

The system's main hub is Bellingham Station, a transportation hub on Railroad Avenue in Downtown Bellingham that opened in 1980 and has 10 bus bays. It incorporates a former freight railroad building that was built in 1900 and renovated into a customer service center and waiting room for passengers. In 2025, WTA purchased the former Bellingham Public Market for use as a future hub to replace Bellingham Station, which regularly reaches capacity. The new hub is scheduled to begin construction by 2030. A secondary hub, Cordata Station, opened in February 2009 and serves northern Bellingham and is near the Whatcom Community College campus.

WTA also funds the "Raven", a passenger van service for residents of Point Roberts—an isolated enclave only connected to land through Canada. The van began service in 2024 and is maintained by a local community organization to provide access to services in Blaine, Ferndale, and Bellingham. WTA previously operated its own van and taxi service on Point Roberts that were later discontinued.

=== Go Lines ===
The Go Lines are four corridors where local service combines for 15-minute headways on weekdays and are branded with a specific color by WTA. They were introduced in 2005.

- Blue Line (route 190): Bellingham Station to Lincoln Street via Western Washington University
- Green Line (route 232): Bellingham Station to Cordata Station and Whatcom Community College via Northwest Ave
- Gold Line (route 331): Bellingham Station to Cordata Station and Whatcom Community College via Barkley Village and Bellis Fair Mall
- Plum Line (routes 512, 525, 533 and 540): Bellingham Station to Lakeway Drive

The Plum Line was added in 2008 but cut in 2010 during service reductions during the Great Recession; it was then reinstated in 2017. A fifth Go Line, the Red Line from Bellingham Station to the Fairhaven Transportation Center, was removed in March 2017. Plans to convert one of three existing GO Lines to bus rapid transit were developed in a 2023 feasibility study, which proposed the addition of transit signal priority, limited stops, and high frequencies. The locally preferred alternative, chosen in 2026, is to add transit signal priority and corridor improvements to the existing Go Lines instead of a separate bus rapid transit system.

=== County Connector ===
Route 80X, known as the County Connector, is an inter-county route jointly operated by WTA and Skagit Transit that runs between Bellingham Station and Skagit Station in Mount Vernon, with intermediate stops at park and rides along Interstate 5. It has nine daily round trips on weekdays and six on weekends. The service is subsidized by the state government and is part of a network that serves Island, Skagit, Snohomish, and Whatcom counties.

== Fares ==
WTA fares are paid using cash or with the Umo Mobility Platform, which includes a smart card and mobile app. A reduced fare card is available for senior citizens, Medicare users, and people with disabilities who apply through a state or local agency. Fares are capped using the Umo platform, allowing passengers to automatically use a pass when they reach the daily or monthly threshold. Western Washington University and Whatcom Community College students receive unlimited rides on WTA bus routes through agreements with the agency. The agreement with Western Washington University is scheduled to be renewed with a 65-cent rate per ride that is paid to WTA, rising to 75 cents after two years, with a maximum cap of 1.1 million rides under existing enrollment projections. A proposal to disband the agreement and replace it with a reduced fare for college students had been announced in 2025 but was criticized by students.

== Administration ==
The agency has a budget of $55.3 million for 2026 and 326 full-time equivalent employee positions. A collective bargaining agreement with the Amalgamated Transit Union covers operators. WTA's headquarters is the Maintenance, Operations and Administration Building (MOAB) in northeastern Bellingham. It also owns Bellingham Station, Cordata Station, and two park-and-ride lots in Ferndale and Lynden. The agency's general manager is Les Reardanz, who retired from the United States Navy Reserve as a rear admiral in 2022. The board of directors has ten members—nine elected officials from jurisdictions within the service area and one non-voting representative from the Amalgamated Transit Union.

== Fleet ==
As of 2025, WTA has 68 full-size buses, 61 paratransit vehicles, and 18 vanpool vans. These include buses that are diesel–electric hybrids as well as battery electric models. Eight units ordered in 2012 are diesel-electric hybrids. WTA took delivery of its first electric battery buses from Gillig in May 2021 and tested a model from Proterra the following year.
