= Bellingham Subdivision =

Railway line in Washington State

The Bellingham Subdivision or Bellingham Sub is a railway line running about 119 miles (191 km) from Everett, Washington to Blaine, Washington. It is operated by BNSF Railway.

== Description ==
Traveling north from PA Jct. in Everett, the main line of the BNSF heads north through Delta Yard and Delta Jct The line crosses the Snohomish River and across 4 bridges 3 that are movable for boat traffic. The line passes through the city of Marysville and by Kruse Jct. which leads to Arlington 6.9 miles (11.1 km) away.

The main line then continues north to the siding at English and the first Amtrak Cascades stop north of Everett at the city of Stanwood. The line continues into the Skagit Valley and passing Conway and to the next station for Amtrak Cascades at Mount Vernon.

The line continues north past the old Mount Vernon station and to the junction at Burlington with the offshoot to Fidalgo or Fidalgo Island to the west and the Sumas Subdivision to the east. From here the line continues north through Bow to the next station at Fairhaven Station. After passing through downtown Bellingham and the old depot, the line continues north through Ferndale to the end of the subdivision at Blaine.

Scheduled traffic on the Bellingham Subdivision consists of four Amtrak Cascades Trains, several manifest trains and occasional unit trains of coal and coke going to Roberts Bank

== History ==
The line section 50 started by a built section of tracks from South Bellingham (Fairhaven) to Burlington in 1889. It was connected to the Canadian boarder in 1891 by Fairhaven & Southern Railway. The Seattle & Montana Railway (Great Northern) built from Seattle in 1891 and the Fairhaven & Southern Railway merged into Montana Railway (Great Northern)by 1898. 1901 the railroad merged again into the Great Northern and the line was completed in 1902. The realignment of the right of way was changed in 1909.

== Gallery ==
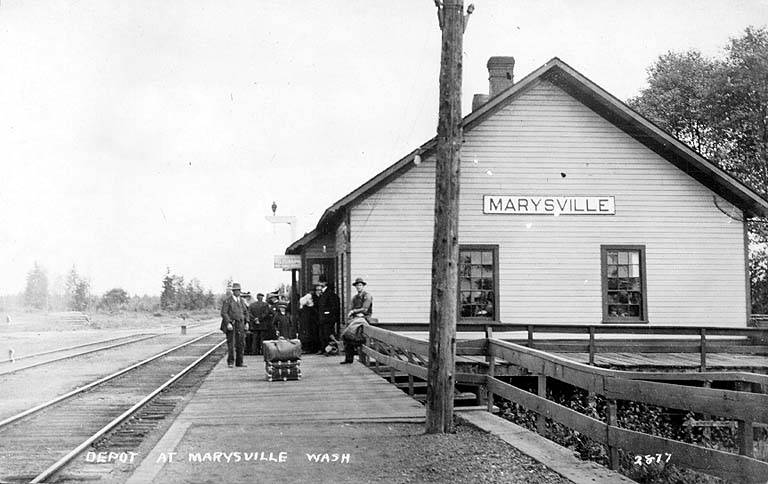
Former Marysville Washington Depot

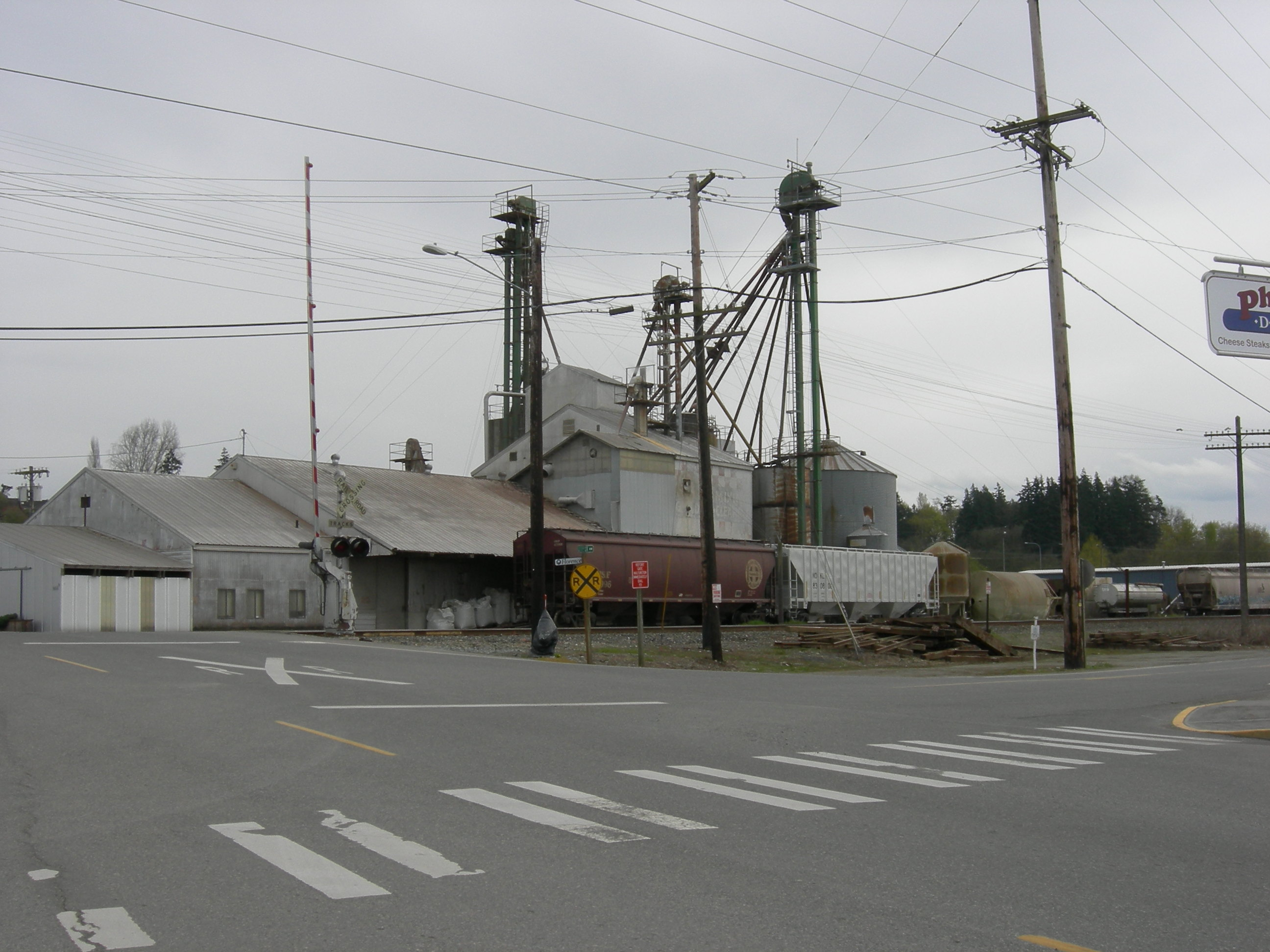
Stanwood Feed and Seed location at Stanwood

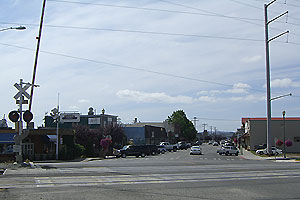
The Stanwood crossing in reverse from above.

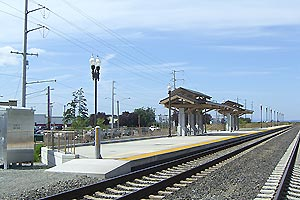
The new Amtrak Cascades stop in Stanwood.

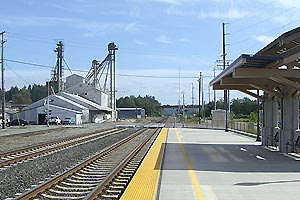
The new Amtrak Cascades stop in Stanwood.

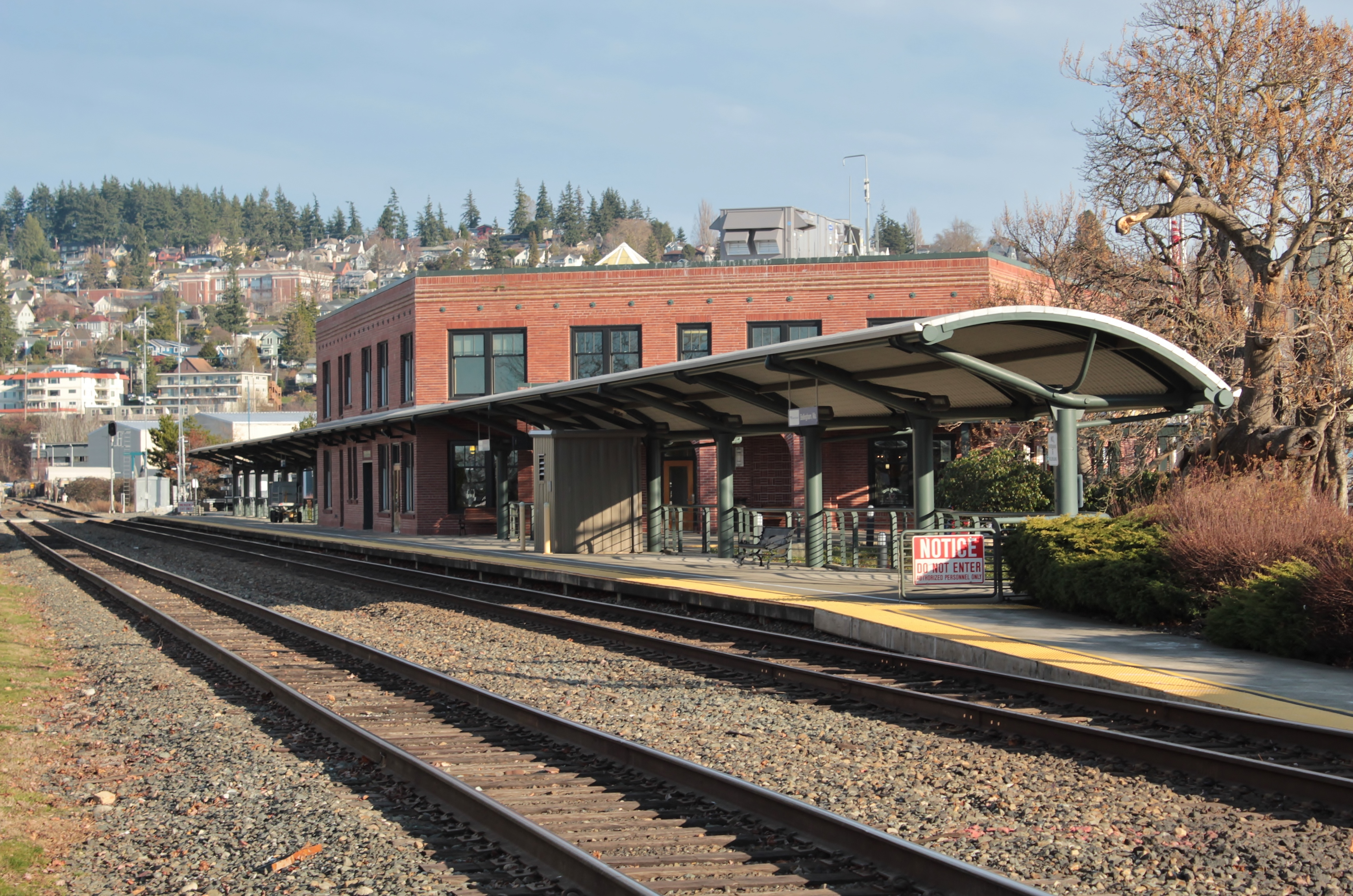
Fairhaven Station at BNSF South Bellingham.

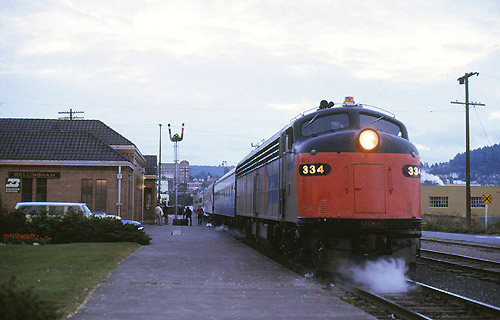
Old Bellingham Station
