= Lincoln Theatre (Mount Vernon, Washington) =

Coordinates: 48°25′05″N 122°20′19″W

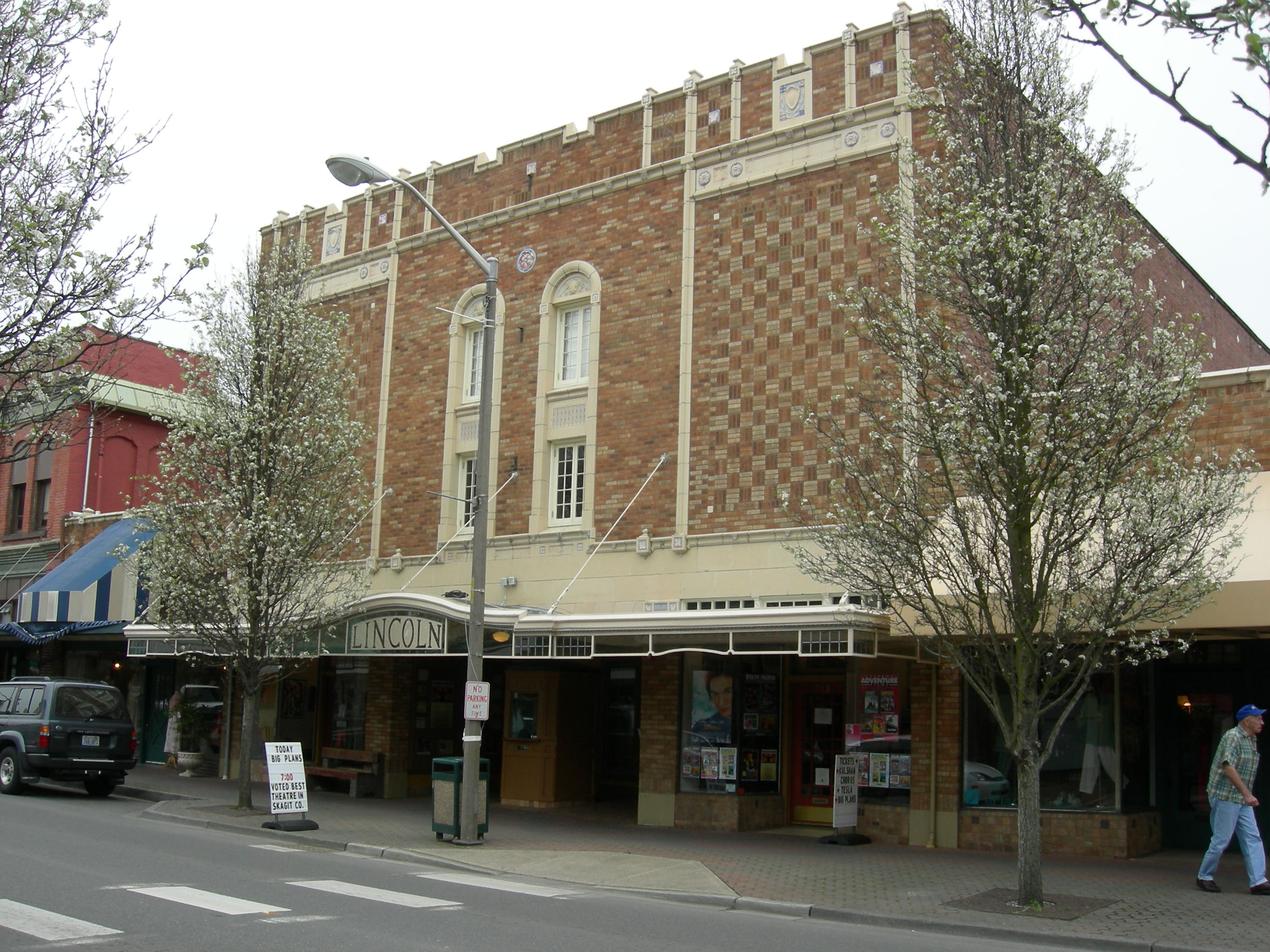
Lincoln Theatre Front

Lincoln Theatre is a multi-purpose theatre in Mount Vernon, Washington, United States. The theatre is located at 712 South First St. It was originally constructed in 1926 as a vaudeville and silent movie house, and currently shows movies several days a week, as well as hosting concerts and other activities. The theatre also contains one of only 98 Wurlitzer theatre organs still located in their original installation.

The Lincoln Theatre is primarily kept running by volunteers, including ticket sales, poster distribution, cleaning, and concessions.

== Theatre organ ==
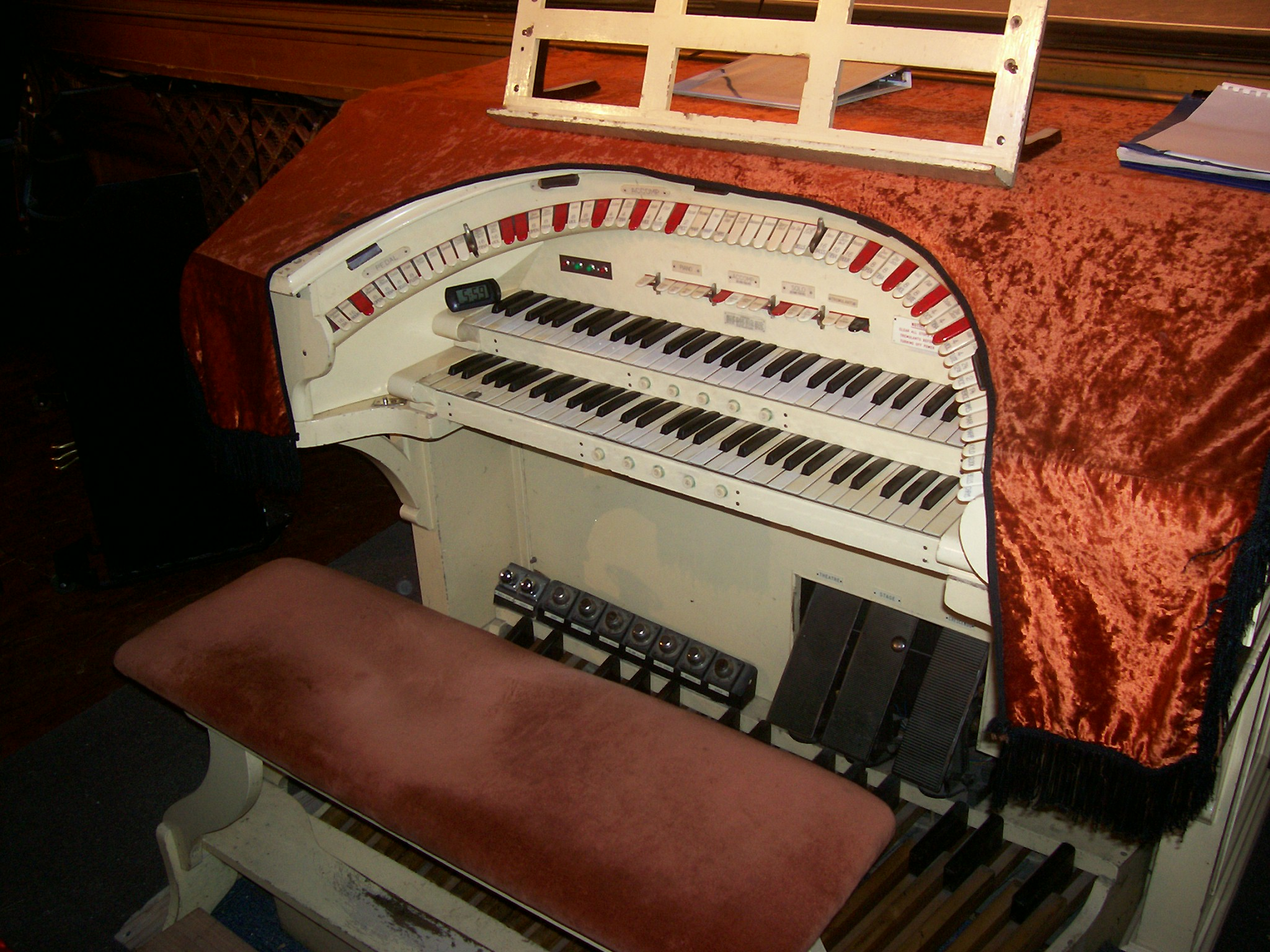
The console

The organ at the Lincoln Theatre is a two-manual, seven-rank style D Special. The addition of "Special" to the style is from the addition of a full piano (with pedal piano extension) to the right of the console, a marimba to the left, and a kinura rank located in the pipe chamber. The cost of purchasing and installing the organ at the time was $22,500.

Ticket sales podium

Because of the niche area of theatre organ culture, only a few volunteers are in charge of caring for and playing the organ. Some concerts have been held exclusively for the organ; however, it is mostly played for 30 minutes before a movie showing by one of the volunteers. On nights which feature an organist, one of the lobby volunteers places a notice informing guests of who is playing that night.
