= Dennis Flannigan =

American politician (1939–2024)

Member of the Washington House of Representatives for the 27th district
- In office January 13, 2003 – January 10, 2011
- Preceded by: Ruth Fisher
- Succeeded by: Laurie Jinkins

Member of the Pierce County Council
- In office 1988–1998

Personal details
- Born: October 3, 1939 Tacoma, Washington
- Died: July 10, 2024 (aged 84)
- Party: Democratic
- Children: 2
- Education: University of Puget Sound

Dennis P. Flannigan (October 3, 1939 – July 10, 2024) was an American politician, civil rights activist, and businessman who served as a member of the Washington House of Representatives for the 27th district from 2003 to 2011.

== Early life and education ==
Flannigan was born and raised in Tacoma, Washington. Flannigan studied American literature at University of Puget Sound, but left in 1964 to participate in the Freedom Summer Project, a volunteer project to register as many African-American voters as possible in Mississippi. After returning from Mississippi, Flannigan briefly resumed his studies at the University of Puget Sound, where he met his wife. Flannigan was later kicked out of the university.

In 2012, the University of Puget Sound conferred Flannigan with an honorary Master of Laws for his service in the Washington State Legislature.

== Career ==
Flannigan operated several non-profit organizations in Tacoma, Washington, including a housing service for low-income residents of Hilltop, Tacoma. He was later offered a role in the administration of Governor Daniel J. Evans and briefly worked as an instructor at Western Washington University.

Flannigan also worked as an independent copywriter, where he was hired to create advertising material for Pierce Transit.

In 1988, he was elected to the Pierce County Council. In 2002, he was elected to the Washington House of Representatives. During his tenure in the House, Flannigan drafted legislation to restore the Murray Morgan Bridge, in addition to a bill that would grant disability benefits to individuals with brain injuries. Flannigan retired from the House in 2010, and was succeeded by Laurie Jinkins.

== Personal life ==
Flannigan and his first wife, Ilse (deceased), had two children. He married his wife Jayasri in 2014.

Flannigan died on July 10, 2024, at the age of 84. He is survived by his two children, four grandchildren, and three stepchildren.
