= Everett Station =

Amtrak and commuter train station in Everett, Washington

General information
- Location: 3201 Smith Avenue; Everett, Washington; United States
- Coordinates: 47.9754°N 122.1976°W
- Owner: City of Everett
- Line: Scenic Subdivision (BNSF)
- Platforms: 2 side platforms
- Tracks: 3
- Bus routes: 23
- Bus stands: 23
- Bus operators: Community Transit, Everett Transit, Island Transit, Skagit Transit, Sound Transit Express
- Connections: Amtrak Thruway, Greyhound Lines, Northwestern Trailways

Construction
- Structure type: At-grade
- Parking: 1,067 spaces
- Cycle facilities: Lockers and racks
- Accessible: Yes

Other information
- Station code: Amtrak: EVR

History
- Opened: February 4, 2002

Passengers
- 38,289 total boardings (Amtrak, FY 2025); 23,782 total boardings (Sounder, 2025)

Services
Preceding station	Amtrak	Following station
Edmonds toward Eugene	Amtrak Cascades	Stanwood toward Vancouver, British Columbia
Edmonds toward Seattle	Empire Builder	Leavenworth toward Chicago
Preceding station	Sound Transit	Following station
Sounder
Mukilteo toward Seattle	N Line	Terminus
Future services
Preceding station	Sound Transit	Following station
Future service
Terminus	3 Line Everett Extension (2037)	SR 526/Evergreen toward Alaska Junction
Location

Everett Station is a train station and intermodal hub that serves the city of Everett, Washington, United States. It is a stop on Amtrak's Cascades and Empire Builder routes, which provide intercity service, and the terminus of the N Line of the Sounder commuter rail system. The station is also a major hub for local and regional buses from Everett Transit, Community Transit, Sound Transit Express, and other providers. Everett Station spans 10 acres (4.0 ha) east of the city's downtown and is centered around a four-story building with a waiting room, offices, a customer service center, and meeting rooms. The station has two train platforms, 23 bus bays that extend south from the station building, several park-and-ride lots, and a pedestrian bridge over the tracks.

The station opened in 2002 and replaced an earlier Amtrak station near the Port of Everett and a bus transfer center in Downtown Everett. It has been the terminus of the N Line since it began service in 2003. Everett Station was expanded in 2009 to become the terminus of the Swift Blue Line, a bus rapid transit service from Community Transit, and to add more parking spaces. The station has a total of 1,067 short-term parking spaces and also serves as the administrative headquarters of Everett Transit. Plans call for a Link light rail station to be placed at or near Everett Station by 2041 as part of the Everett Link Extension project.

== History ==
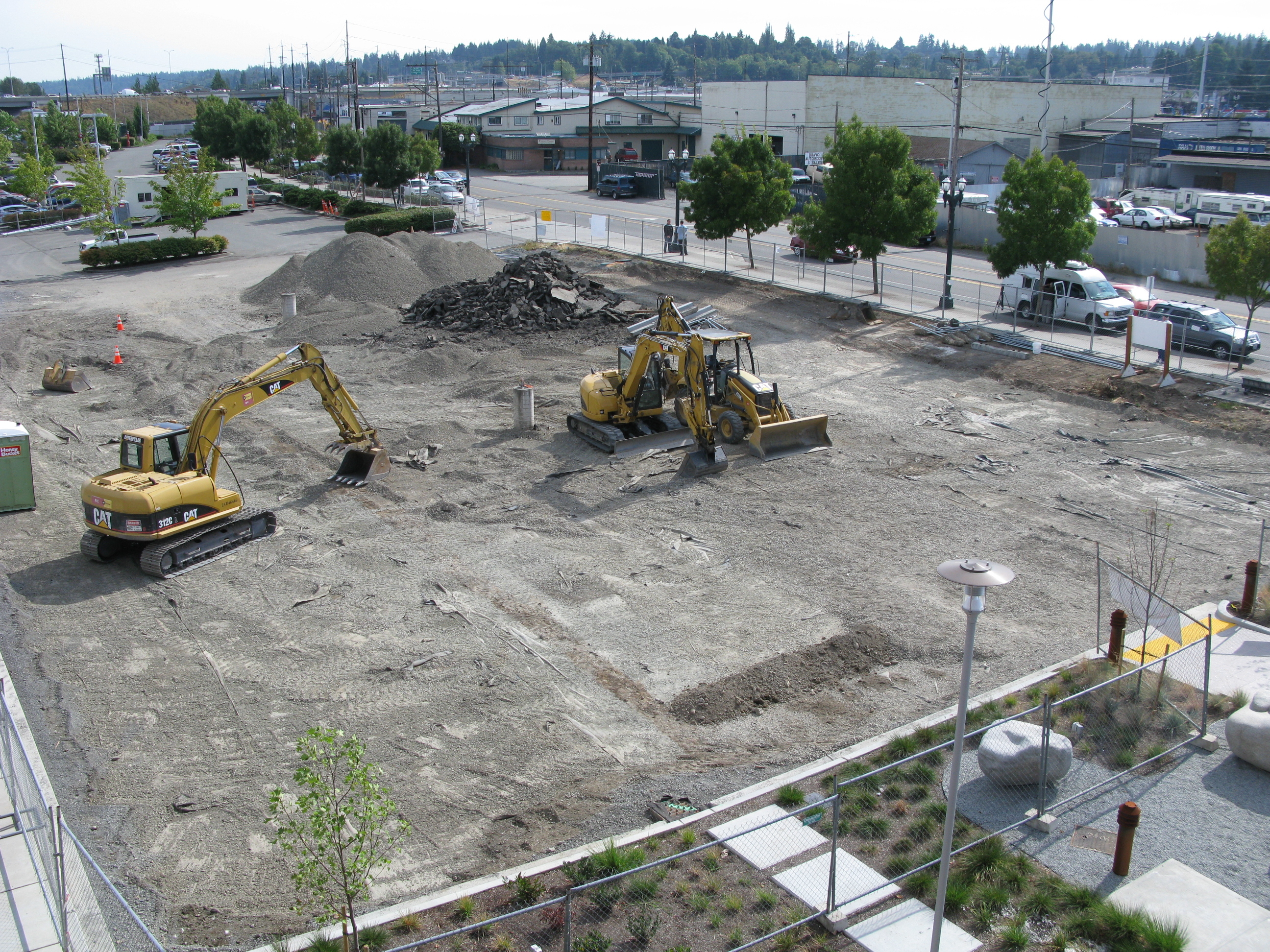
Construction of the Swift Bus Rapid Transit terminal in 2009

Prior to the opening of Everett Station in 2002, Amtrak served the city of Everett at a small station located at 2900 Bond Street, overlooking the Port of Everett west of downtown. It saw free commuter rail service from January to March 1995 as part of the "Try Rail" demonstration, consisting of two daily roundtrips from Seattle and special service to Seattle SuperSonics games at the Tacoma Dome. The Bond Street Station, originally built by the Great Northern Railway in 1910, was originally planned to be kept as a secondary commuter rail station without parking or major bus connections until it was removed from Sound Transit's plans in 2001. The station was closed in November 2002 and has since become the offices of the BNSF Railway Northwest Division.

The City of Everett selected a straightaway track segment east of downtown as the preferred location of a multimodal train/bus station, to replace the existing Amtrak station at Bond Street, in 1993. The Everett City Council chose a two-block industrial site bordered by Pacific Avenue to the north in 1995, estimating a cost of $30 million and an opening in 1998. Everett Mayor Ed Hansen proposed adding two additional stories to the station building to house classrooms and space for career counseling services, inspired by a similar project in Oakland, California. The Sound Transit Board passed a resolution in February 1999 allowing the use of $14 million to begin work on the Everett Multimodal Facility, which was to be the terminus for Sounder commuter rail and Sound Transit Express bus service. A groundbreaking ceremony was held on July 13, 2000, allowing for construction on Everett Station to begin. Sound Transit began with the construction of the Pacific Avenue overpass, replacing an earlier at-grade crossing, that opened on November 14, 2001 at a cost of $20 million. The station building was designed by the Zimmer Gunsul Frasca Partnership and built by Wilder Construction Company in 2000 and 2001.

The $46.9 million station was opened during a ribbon-cutting ceremony on February 4, 2002, attended by Everett Mayor Ed Hansen, Governor Gary Locke, U.S. Representative Rick Larsen, Snohomish County Executive Bob Drewel and Sound Transit Board chairman and King County Executive Ron Sims. Initially, only Everett Transit and Community Transit operated out of the station on opening day, but they were quickly joined by Sound Transit Express service the following day and Greyhound intercity bus service that summer. Amtrak was initially expected to begin serving Everett Station in July 2002, but the construction of a passing track delayed the move of the Cascades and Empire Builder from Bond Street Station to November 12. Construction of a Sounder commuter rail platform and rail spur was approved by the Everett City Council in September 2002, pending reimbursement from Sound Transit and Amtrak for its cost of $726,000. The track was extended by 510 feet (160 m) to serve as a layover for commuter trains. Sounder service to King Street Station in Seattle via Edmonds began with special Seattle Seahawks gameday service on December 22, 2003, carrying 700 passengers on the inaugural run of the Sounder North Line (now the N Line).

Sound Transit expanded parking capacity at Everett Station to 1,067 spaces with the addition of 440 stalls, located east of the station and connected via a pedestrian overpass, that opened in May 2009 at a cost of $13.6 million. The southern lot of the station was cleared to build the terminus of Community Transit's Swift Bus Rapid Transit Blue Line, which began service on November 29, 2009, connecting Everett to Shoreline via the State Route 99 corridor.

Everett Station was proposed as the site of a University of Washington branch campus, with state consultants choosing 32 acres (0.13 km^{2}) around the station to house 5,000 students from Snohomish, Island County and Skagit County. The project, dubbed UW North Sound, was put on hold in December 2008 and has since been canceled.

== Station layout ==
The Everett Station complex is located on 10 acres (4.0 ha; 0.016 sq mi) situated between Downtown Everett to the west and Interstate 5 to the east. The train platforms are located on the east side of the station building and bus bays, along three BNSF-owned railway tracks. The covered west platform, used by the Sounder commuter rail service, is located directly east of the station building, while a partially sheltered platform, used by Amtrak, is situated on the second set of tracks and is accessible by several pedestrian at-grade crossings. Directly south of the main building are the 23 bus bays, which are centered around a covered walkway that connects the train platforms to the Swift bus rapid transit station, served by the Blue Line. 1,067 short-term parking spaces are located around the station complex, including the initial parking lot west of the tracks and an additional parking lot accessible by a pedestrian bridge over the tracks. In addition to the short-term parking lots, there are 25 designated Amtrak/Greyhound parking stalls and eight rideshare vehicles stalls located at the front of the station building.

=== Station building ===
The station building is a four-floor brick-and-glass structure housing 64,000 square feet (5,900 m^{2}) that includes ticketing offices, a waiting area, classrooms, and community rooms. The front façade mainly comprises a three-story glass wall inside of a 34,000-pound (15,000 kg; 15 t) precast steel arch, facing a small plaza at the intersection of Smith Avenue and 32nd Street. The lobby is decorated with an inlaid terrazzo floor, designed by Judith and Daniel Caldwell to depict local waterways and 29 historic ships. The three-story atrium consists of a large glass wall and a clock named the "Millennial Chronometer" above the eastern staircase. The station building, designed by architectural firm Zimmer Gunsul Frasca Partnership, houses ticket counters and waiting areas for Amtrak and Greyhound in addition to passenger amenities, such as restrooms, a customer service center, and ORCA card vending machines, open daily from 7am to 9pm. The station has weatherproof bicycle lockers in addition to 6 short-term bicycle racks located at the front of the station.

In addition to being a multimodal hub for train and bus service, Everett Station functions as a home to social services and educational programs. University Center of North Puget Sound was formerly located on the 2nd floor of the station building, providing baccalaureate and graduate degrees through local universities and colleges until it moved to the campus of Everett Community College in 2010. The Everett branches of WorkForce and WorkSource, public employment services operated by the Washington State Employment Security Department that provide career development training and job placement assistance to unemployed, were located on the 3rd and 4th floors, respectively. The 4th floor is also home to the rentable Weyerhaeuser Room, a 2,800-square-foot (0.00026 km^{2}) public meeting space, named for the philanthropic arm of the Weyerhaeuser Company in 2003. The Weyerhaeuser Room includes two large murals painted by Kenneth Callahan that depict the lumber industry and were originally installed in a local sawmill from 1944 to 1974.

The first floor is occupied by the Bezos Academy, a private tuition-free preschool funded by Amazon founder Jeff Bezos. It opened on March 2, 2023, with three classrooms, a kitchen, and an outdoor playground in a former parking lot. A ten-year lease for the 3,800-square-foot (350 m^{2}) space was approved by the Everett City Council in January 2022 for $1 per month. The second floor has been leased to Citrine Health since 2023. A lease for 640 square feet (59 m^{2}) on the ground floor for a model railroad club was approved in 2023; the Swamp Creek and Western Railroad Association had planned to move their exhibit from Edmonds station to the new space in June 2023.

A seasonal farmers' market at the station was established in 2019 and opened on Wednesdays with vendors along 32nd Street, which was closed to traffic. It was suspended during the COVID-19 pandemic and returned in 2023 with an artificial turf surface laid over the street.

=== Awards and recognition ===
The City of Everett and ZGF Partnership were recognized by the Puget Sound Regional Council with a "Vision 2020" award for its combination of a transportation hub and community gathering place into a single project. Everett Station also won the 2006 Citation Award from the Washington branch of the American Institute of Architects, whose jury commended the City of Everett on the station housing "an innovative mix of transit, educational functions, and community spaces; delights travelers; and is welcoming to the public for classes, public meetings, and banquets."

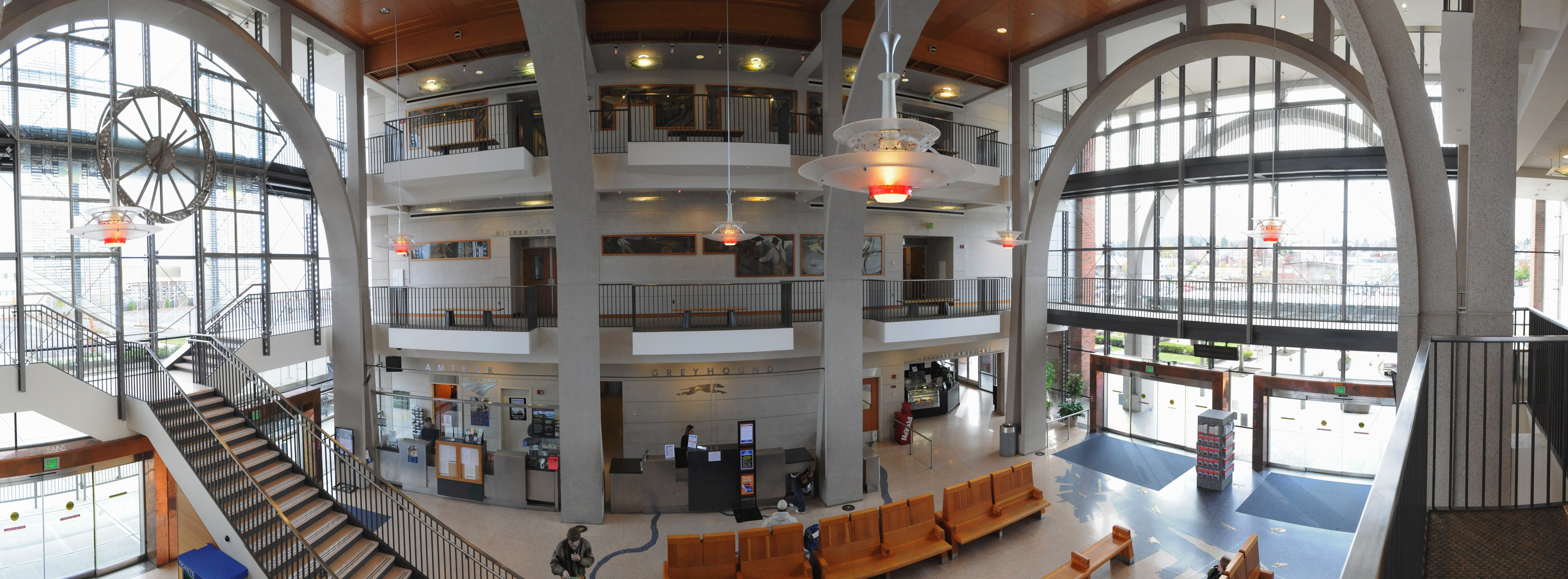
Panorama of the main building interior, from a 2nd story balcony overlooking the lobby

== Services ==
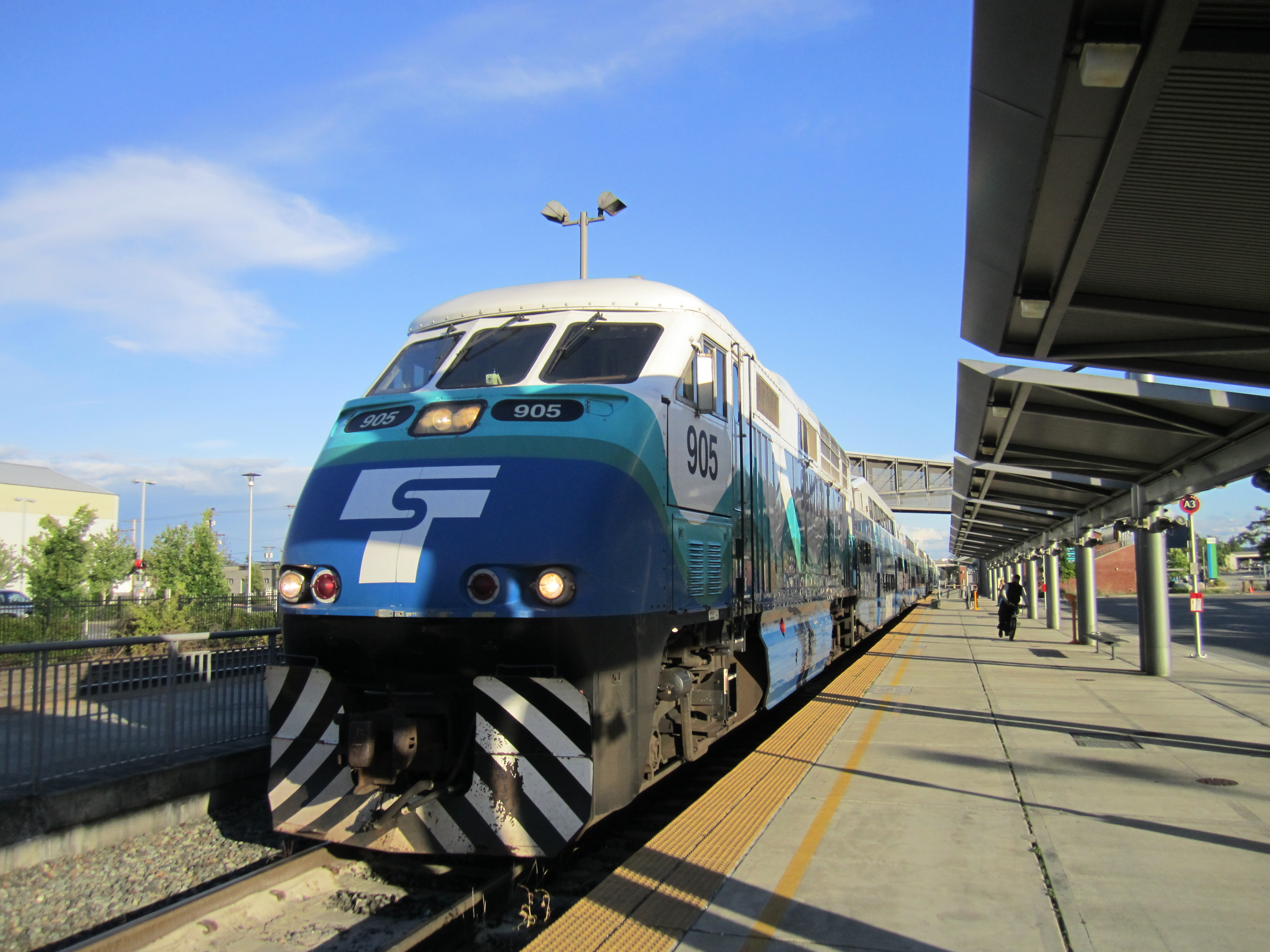
The Sounder N Line connects Everett Station to King Street Station in Seattle

Amtrak operates intercity trains that serve Everett Station and use the outer platform. The Cascades runs between Portland, Oregon, Seattle, and Vancouver, British Columbia, with two daily round trips. The service is partially funded by the Washington State Department of Transportation. The Empire Builder is a long-distance train that begins in Seattle and travels through Everett towards Chicago with one round trip per day. Both Amtrak trains share the Scenic Subdivision corridor from Everett to King Street Station in Seattle and make an intermediate stop at Edmonds station. They carried a total of 38,289 passengers at Everett Station in FY 2025. Everett Station also serves as the northern terminus of the Sounder N Line, a commuter train that connects Snohomish County to King Street Station in Seattle. The line is managed by Sound Transit and operates four trains in the peak direction towards Seattle in the morning rush hour and towards Everett in the evening. Sounder trains also operate on select weekends for special events, including sports games and concerts in Seattle. Everett Station had 23,782 total N Line passengers in 2025.

The Everett Station complex also includes a bus station with 23 bus bays that serve as a major transfer station for routes from Snohomish County. Everett Transit operates the majority of its bus routes out of their 12 bus bays on Smith Avenue. Community Transit has six routes at the station, serving as the hub for local service from Smokey Point, Marysville, Snohomish, Lake Stevens, and Monroe; The Swift Blue Line, a bus rapid transit service on the Highway 99 corridor operated by Community Transit, terminates at Everett Station. Sound Transit runs three of its ST Express bus routes out of Everett Station, with peak-only, limited-stop service to Seattle and Bellevue, as well as all-day service to Lynnwood City Center station, along Interstate 5. Skagit Transit runs a weekday inter-county express route (Route 90X) from the station to Skagit Station in Mount Vernon and Chuckanut Park & Ride in Burlington; Island Transit also runs a peak-only weekday express route (Route 412C) from Everett Station to Stanwood and Camano Island. Paratransit to the front door of the station building is provided by Community Transit and Everett Transit through dial-a-ride and paratransit programs.

Daily intercity bus service to Everett Station is provided by Greyhound Lines and Northwestern Trailways. In March 2019, Greyhound's BoltBus express service began serving Everett Station with 48 departures to Vancouver, Bellingham, Tacoma, and Portland, Oregon. The service was discontinued by Greyhound in 2021.

== Future plans ==
Link light rail service is expected to be extended from Lynnwood City Center station to Everett in 2037 or 2041 depending on the availability of funding. The project was approved in the Sound Transit 3 package passed by voters in 2016. The terminus serving downtown Everett is planned to either be located adjacent to Everett Station, as presumed in earlier studies, or closer to Broadway between Pacific Avenue and Wall Street to serve other destinations. In 2012, the City of Everett began to rezone the station's surrounding area to allow multifamily housing, encouraging transit-oriented development by raising height limits to 80 feet (24 m). Another proposal would have a 500-stall parking garage built to replace the southernmost lot at a cost of $15–18 million, allowing Everett Transit to transform the existing western lot into mixed-use development.

Everett Station is also among several options for a future high-speed rail station serving Snohomish County on the Pacific Northwest Corridor, generally following the existing Cascades corridor. The project, led by the Washington State Department of Transportation, was approved for planning in 2022 but is not expected to begin construction for at least a decade.
