= Fairhaven Station =

Train station in Fairhaven, Washington

Fairhaven Station Bellingham, WA
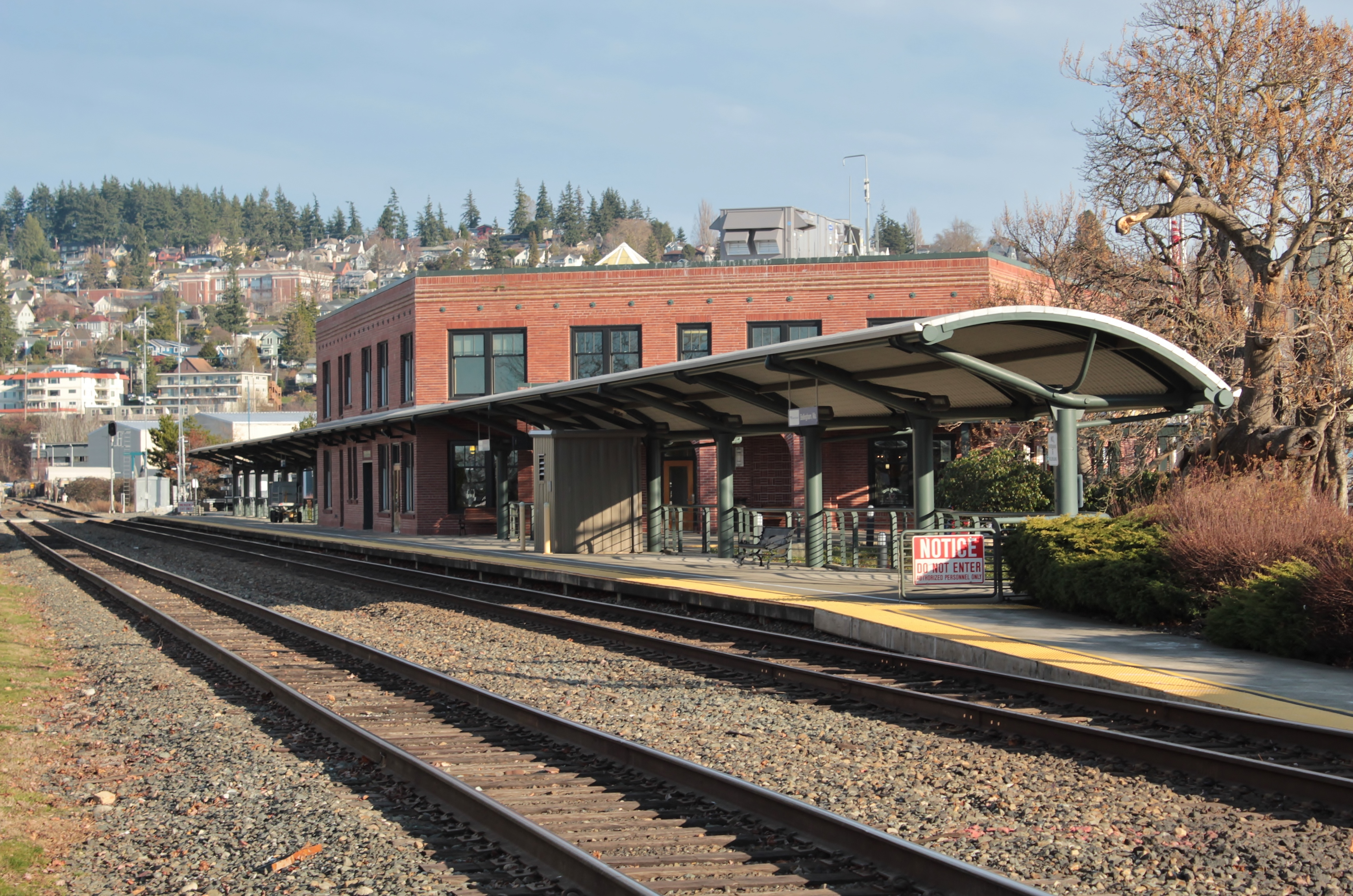
- Fairhaven Station platform

General information
- Location: 401 Harris Avenue; Bellingham, Washington; United States
- Coordinates: 48.7205°N 122.5111°W
- Owner: Port of Bellingham
- Line: BNSF Bellingham Subdivision
- Platforms: 1 side platform
- Tracks: 2
- Bus stands: 6
- Bus operators: Amtrak Thruway, Greyhound, FlixBus
- Connections: Alaska Marine Highway; Whatcom Transportation Authority

Construction
- Structure type: At-grade
- Parking: Yes; paid
- Accessible: Yes

Other information
- Station code: Amtrak: BEL

History
- Opened: 1995

Passengers
- FY 2025: 66,526 (Amtrak)

Services
Preceding station	Amtrak	Following station
Mount Vernon toward Eugene	Amtrak Cascades	Vancouver, British Columbia Terminus
Location

Fairhaven Station, also called Bellingham, is a train station serving Amtrak's Cascades route, as well as a bus station serving Greyhound Lines and local Whatcom Transportation Authority buses, in Bellingham, Washington, United States. Built in 1995, the station is located near the Bellingham Cruise Terminal, the southern connection for the Alaska Marine Highway. Water Taxi services and seasonal whale watching excursions also provide connections from the Bellingham Cruise Terminal to the San Juan Islands.

Fairhaven Station is owned by the Port of Bellingham and is the last northbound stop in the United States on the Amtrak Cascades route before it enters Canada. Passengers clear both Canadian and American customs in Vancouver, so trains do not stop at the border.

Bellingham is the northernmost Amtrak station in the United States.

== Boardings and alightings ==
Year	2011	2012	2013	2014	2015	2016	2017
Total	59,490	64,091	55,325	54,888	51,915	50,896	51,219
YOY Difference	-	4,601	-8,766	-437	-2,973	-1,019	323
YOY Difference %	-	7.73%	-13.68%	-0.79%	-5.42%	-1.96%	0.63%
