= Island Transit (Washington) =

Local public transit operator in Island County, Washington

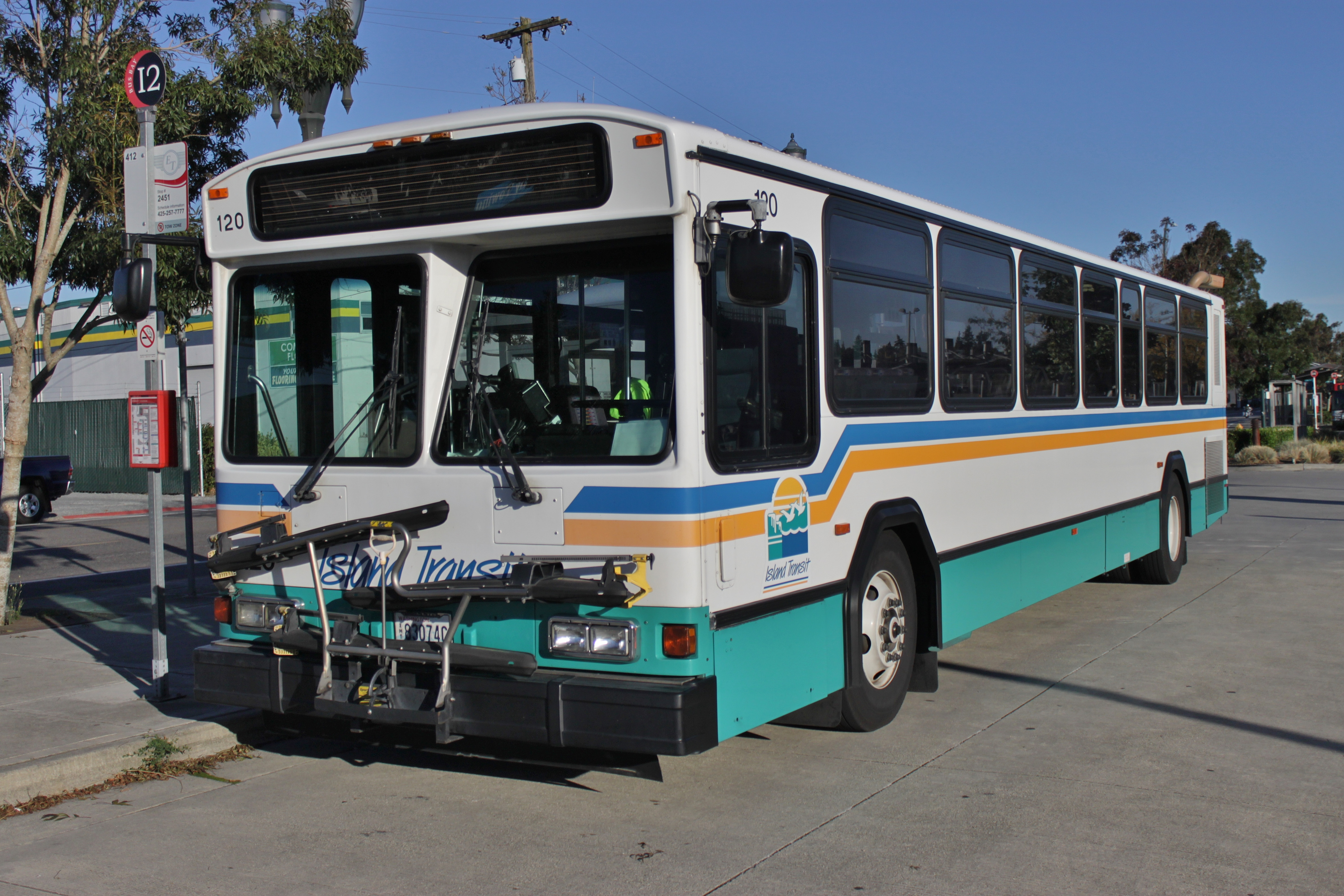
- Island Transit's County Connector bus at Everett Station
- Commenced operation: December 1, 1987
- Headquarters: 19758 State Route 20; Coupeville, Washington
- Service area: Island County, Washington
- Service type: Bus service, paratransit, vanpool
- Routes: 17
- Annual ridership: 380,574 (2023)
- Fuel type: Diesel, Gasoline, and Biodiesel
- Executive Director: Melinda Adams
- Website: www.islandtransit.org

Island Transit is a zero-fare transit system in Island County, Washington, serving Whidbey Island and Camano Island. The system consists of fixed-route bus service, paratransit, and vanpools, and carried a total of 380,574 passengers in 2023. Until 2023, there was no Sunday or holiday service on Island Transit routes.

The system is funded by a 0.9 percent sales tax within Island County, as well as state and federal grants. The tax was initially 0.3 percent when bus service started in 1987, but was increased in 2000 and 2009 in response to funding shortfalls.

== History ==
Island Transit was established in 1983 as a public transportation benefit area (PTBA), a type of municipal corporation in Washington state for public transit agencies. The Island County Board of Commissioners proposed the creation of a PTBA in September 1980, using a 0.3 percent sales and use tax to fund a bus system. The first countywide vote was rejected in November 1980, but a pilot project with two vans to serve Coupeville and Oak Harbor was launched by the county government. The sales tax was rejected again in September 1982 by a narrow margin of 212 votes; in response, the boundaries of the PTBA were re-drawn to exclude part of northern Whidbey Island and all of Camano Island.

The sales tax and transit system was approved by 56.5 percent of voters in a third ballot measure, held on November 8, 1983, within the revised boundaries. A lawsuit was filed in 1985 challenging the revision of PTBA boundaries prior to the third vote, with the appellants from northern Whidbey arguing that their constitutional rights of equal protection and equal suffrage were deprived because of their inability to vote on the measure. In July 1986, the Washington Supreme Court unanimously upheld the PTBA's boundary revision, allowing it to begin collecting sales tax that was authorized by the vote. The system was officially named "Island Transit" in February 1987 and conducted public hearings on its proposed routes.

Island Transit launched on December 1, 1987, with four routes that served Oak Harbor and southern Whidbey Island, vanpool service to the Boeing Everett Factory, and contracted dial-a-ride service. The system grew from 161 riders on its first day to over 1,400 daily passengers within a few months. Passengers were originally charged no fares as a six-month trial that was later extended through the rest of 1988 due to its popularity. The fare-free policy was extended several times by Island Transit before being officially adopted.

In March 1992, Island Transit became the first agency in the state of Washington to operate paratransit service required by the new Americans with Disabilities Act. Later that year, northern Whidbey Island was annexed into the PTBA district after approval from voters; service to northern Whidbey Island began the following March. Camano Island voters approved annexation into the Island Transit district on May 16, 1996, after trial service to the island that began in January. The agency opened its first transit center, located in Oak Harbor, in December 1996.

The passage of Initiative 695 in November 1999 eliminated the use of motor vehicle excise tax, a funding source for local transit throughout the state, including 60 percent of Island Transit's annual fixed revenue. By the end of the year, intra-county service to Mount Vernon and Saturday service on Whidbey Island were both cancelled, and 13 employees were laid off. In May 2000, a 0.3 percent sales tax increase for Island Transit was approved, bringing the total tax to 0.6 percent. Saturday service was restored in August, and a new route to Mount Vernon began in July 2001. Intra-county service was expanded in September 2005 with the establishment of the "County Connector" network by Island Transit, Skagit Transit and Whatcom Transit Authority, with routes from Whidbey Island to Mount Vernon as well as Camano Island to Mount Vernon and Everett Station.

The sales tax was increased once again, to 0.9 percent, in 2009 by voters amidst the Great Recession and declining sales tax revenue. Island Transit laid off 24 employees and cancelled several routes in 2014 due to a shortfall in revenues earmarked for operations. The planned withdrawal of state funding for inter-county service in 2017 led to fares being introduced on one route, the restored Camano–Everett express, in 2016 after it had been cut. Saturday service, which was eliminated in the 2014 cuts, was later restored in January 2018. The agency considered introducing fares for all of its routes in 2018 to fund service improvements, but rejected the proposal due to public opposition and impacts to ridership.

Island Transit launched its on-demand microtransit service, branded as "Island Transit GO!", in April 2022 with battery electric vans to provide service in five zones. In 2023, Island Transit purchased 38 acres (15 ha) near its Coupeville headquarters for future uses, including a potential solar farm or hydrogen fueling station for buses. The agency unveiled a new logo and bus livery in January 2024.

== Routes ==
As of November 2024

=== All Whidbey ===
- Route 1: (Oak Harbor to Clinton): via Coupeville, Greenbank, South Whidbey State Park, Freeland, and Bayview
- Route 1 Saturday: Oak Harbor to Coupeville/Clinton Ferries

=== North/Central Whidbey ===
- Route 4: (Oak Harbor to Deception Pass State Park) Sunday only.
- Route 6: (Oak Harbor to Coupeville): Oak Harbor to Coupeville Ferry Terminal, via Coupeville, Fort Casey
- Route 9: (West Oak Harbor)
- Route 10: (Central Oak Harbor)
- Route 411W: (County Connector): Oak Harbor to March's Point, via Troxell/Ducken; connection to Skagit Transit

=== South Whidbey ===
- Route 58: (Satchet Head to Clinton Ferry): Clinton to Satchet Head via Cultus Bay Road
- Route 60: (Saturday) Bayview to Clinton Ferry via Langley

=== Camano Island ===
- Route 1C (West Camano Island): Terry's Corner to Camano Plaza, Lost Lake, Cama Beach, Chapman, and Huntington
- Route 3C: Terry's Corner to Stanwood; connection to Community Transit
- Route 411C (County Connector): Terry's Corner to Mount Vernon, via Stanwood (Saturday's this route is combined with Route 3C)
- Route 412C (County Connector): Terry's Corner to Everett Station

=== Island Transit GO! (Microtransit) ===
- Zone 2 (Camano)
- Zone 3 (Oak Harbor)
- Zone 6 (Coupeville)
- Zone 58 (Satchet Head/Clinton Ferry)
- NASWI On Demand
