= Skagit Transit =

Local public transit operator in Skagit County, Washington

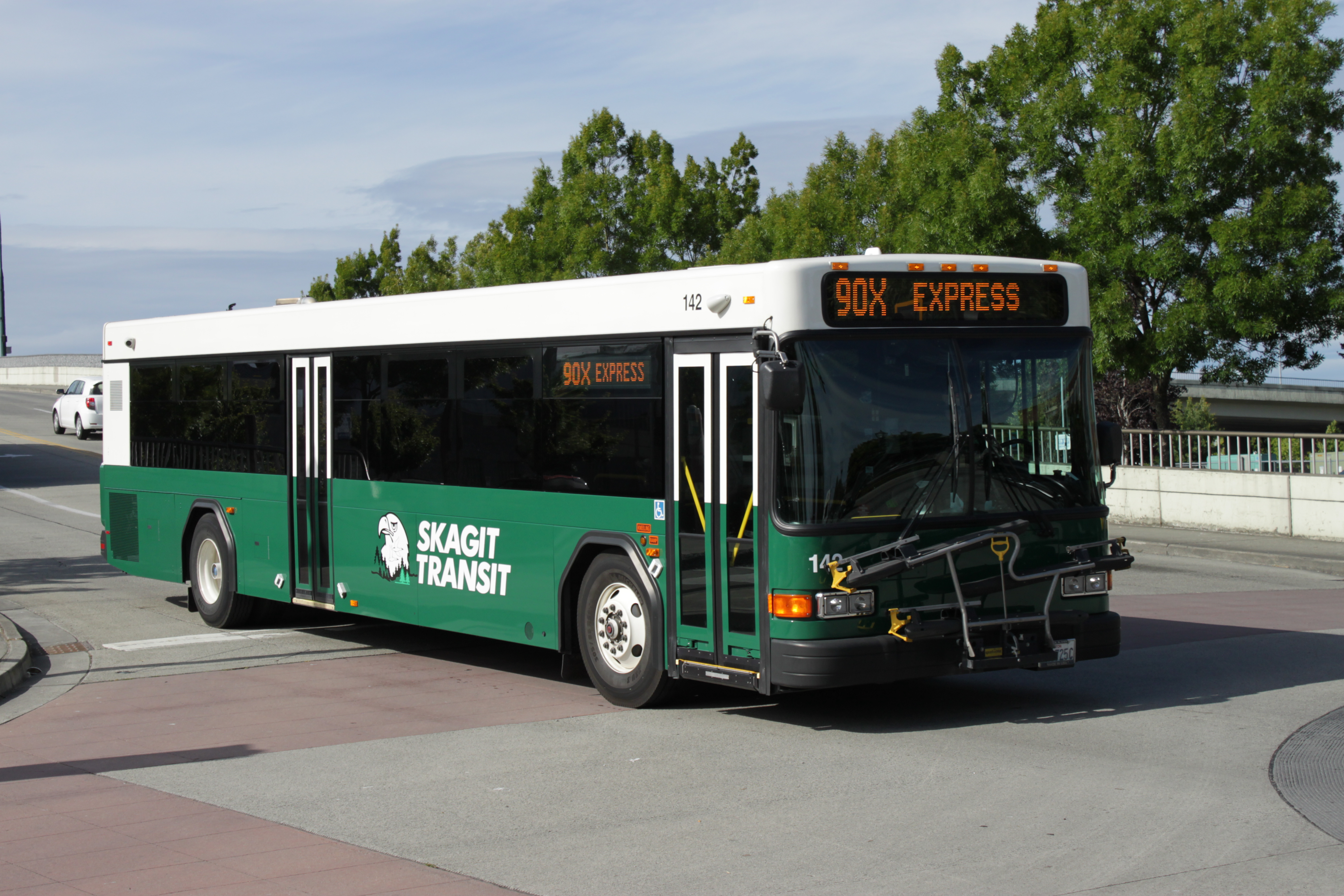
- Skagit Transit bus at Everett Station
- Founded: 1993
- Headquarters: 600 County Shop Lane, Burlington, WA 98233-9772
- Service area: Skagit County, WA
- Service type: bus service, dial-a-bus, vanpool
- Routes: 19 fixed-route, paratransit
- Stops: 505
- Hubs: Skagit Station
- Fleet: fixed-route, paratransit, vanpool
- Daily ridership: 1,308
- Website: www.skagittransit.org

Skagit Transit is a public transit system in Skagit County, Washington, US. It operates 19 fixed-route bus routes, as well as paratransit and vanpool services across the entire county. The agency was founded in 1993 and is funded by a 0.4 percent local sales tax.

== History ==
The Skagit County public transportation benefit area, funded by a 0.2 percent sales tax, was approved by voters in Mount Vernon and Burlington in November 1992. Bus service began on November 3, 1993, with a network of four routes serving the two cities and no fares. The cities of Anacortes, La Conner, and Sedro-Woolley were annexed into the Skagit Transit service area in 1994, followed by Bayview and Concrete in 1995.

Service was cut after the passage of Initiative 695 in 2000. A sales tax increase to restore service was rejected by voters in 2002; as a result, the agency began charging fares. Skagit Transit began operating inter-county routes to Island and Whatcom counties in 2005, and expanded with a Mount Vernon–Everett commuter route in 2006 part-funded by Island Transit and the state government. The agency also took ownership of Skagit Station in Mount Vernon, which is served by Amtrak Cascades and Island Transit. A 0.2 percent sales tax increase was approved by voters in the November 2008 election, allowing for expanded service.

== Facilities ==
The primary maintenance and administration facility for Skagit Transit is located in Burlington.

=== Skagit Station ===
A multimodal station serviced by Greyhound, Amtrak Cascades, Bellingham Connector (Whatcom Transportation Authority), Island Connector (Island Transit) and Everett Express which connects with Sounder commuter rail in Everett.

== Fares ==
Regular fares for adults are $1 each way on local routes and $2 on County Connector routes; reduced fares for senior citizens, veterans, and people with disabilities are half the regular fare. Since 2022, youth fares on Skagit Transit have been free as part of a statewide program funded by the Climate Commitment Act. The agency also offers day passes and monthly passes for both regular and reduced fares. Fares can be paid with cash or the Umo fare card and smartphone app, which is shared with the Whatcom Transportation Authority.

== Bus routes ==
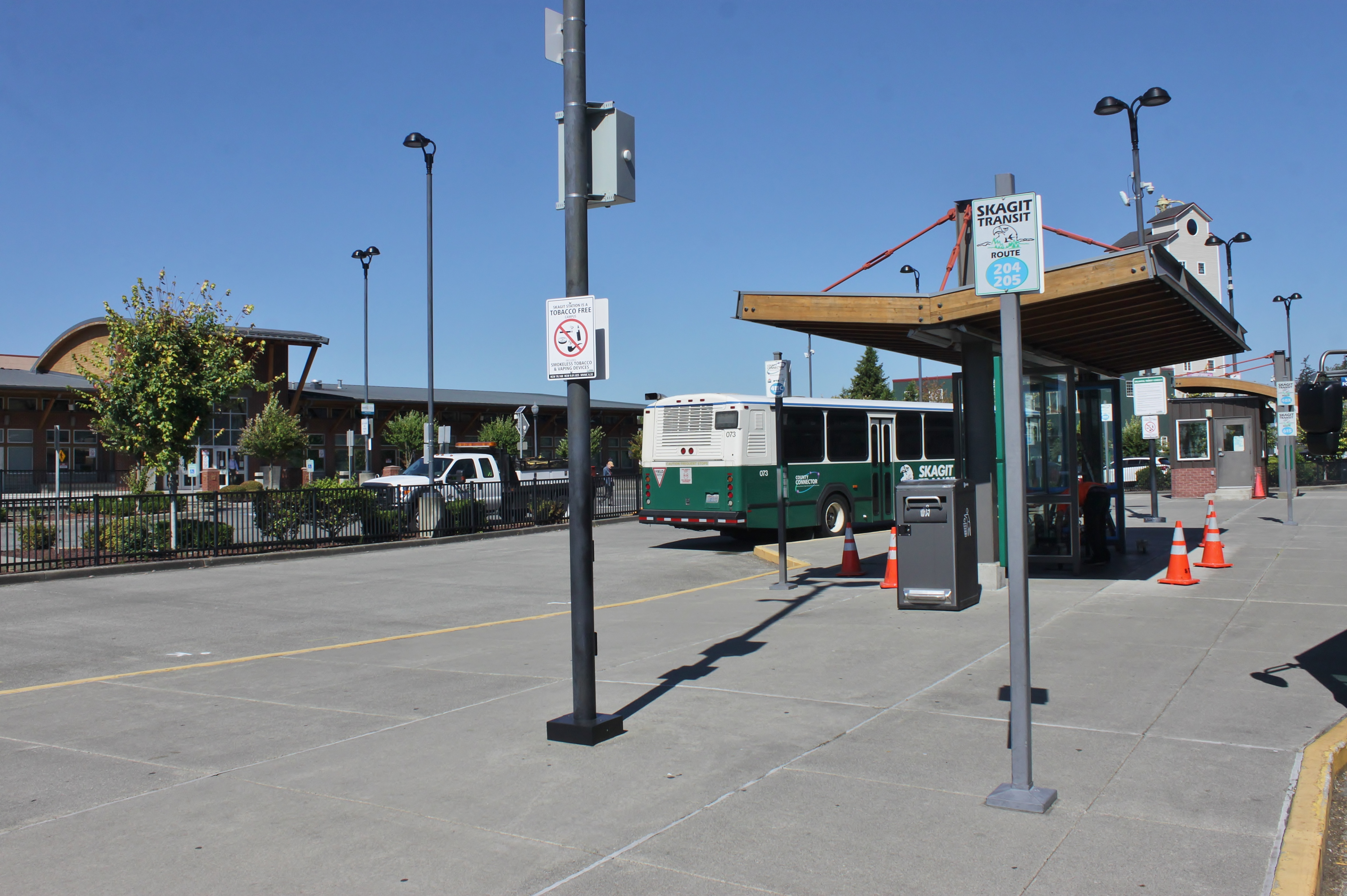
Bus platforms at the Skagit Transportation Center

=== Local routes ===
As of the May 1, 2023 service.

- Route 101 - Burlington, Washington Circular
- Route 202 - Skagit Station/South MV Park & Ride
- Route 204 - Skagit Station to Skagit Highlands via Skagit Valley College
- Route 205 - Skagit Valley College to Skagit Station
- Route 206 - Skagit Station to Skagit Valley Hospital via Mount Baker Middle School
- Route 207 - Skagit Station to Walmart to Skagit Valley College
- Route 208 - Skagit Station to Chuckanut Park & Ride Burlington
- Route 300 - Sedro Woolley Circular from Sedro Woolley Park and Ride
- Route 301 - Burlington to Sedro Woolley Park & Ride from Chuckanut Park & Ride
- Route 305 - Skagit Valley College to Sedro-Woolley via Clear Lake
- Route 409 - 10th & Q Street to Island Hospital
- Route 410 - March Point Park & Ride to Anacortes ferry terminal
- Route 513 - Burlington, Washington to Anacortes, via Skagit Regional Airport from Chuckanut Park & Ride
- Route 615 - March Point Park & Ride to La Conner to Mount Vernon
- Route 717 - Concrete Park and Ride to Cape Horn to Cedar Grove
- Route 40X - Skagit Station to March's Point Park and Ride
- Route 70X - Skagit Station to Concrete Park and Ride

=== County Connector Routes ===
- Bellingham Connector (Route 80X) - Mount Vernon to Bellingham
- Everett Connector (Route 90X)- Burlington to Everett Station, via Mount Vernon
