= Ruth Fisher (politician) =

American politician

Member of the Washington House of Representatives from the 27th district
- In office January 10, 1983 – January 13, 2003
- Preceded by: James E. Salatino
- Succeeded by: Dennis Flannigan

Personal details
- Born: July 21, 1925 Tacoma, Washington, U.S.
- Died: February 21, 2005 (aged 79) Tacoma, Washington, U.S.
- Party: Democratic
- Children: 2
- Education: University of Puget Sound
- Occupation: Pierce County Planning Commissioner

Ruth Fisher (July 21, 1925 – February 21, 2005) was an American politician who served in the Washington House of Representatives from the 27th district from 1983 to 2003.
