= Mount Vernon, Washington =

County seat of Skagit County, Washington, United States

Mount Vernon
- City
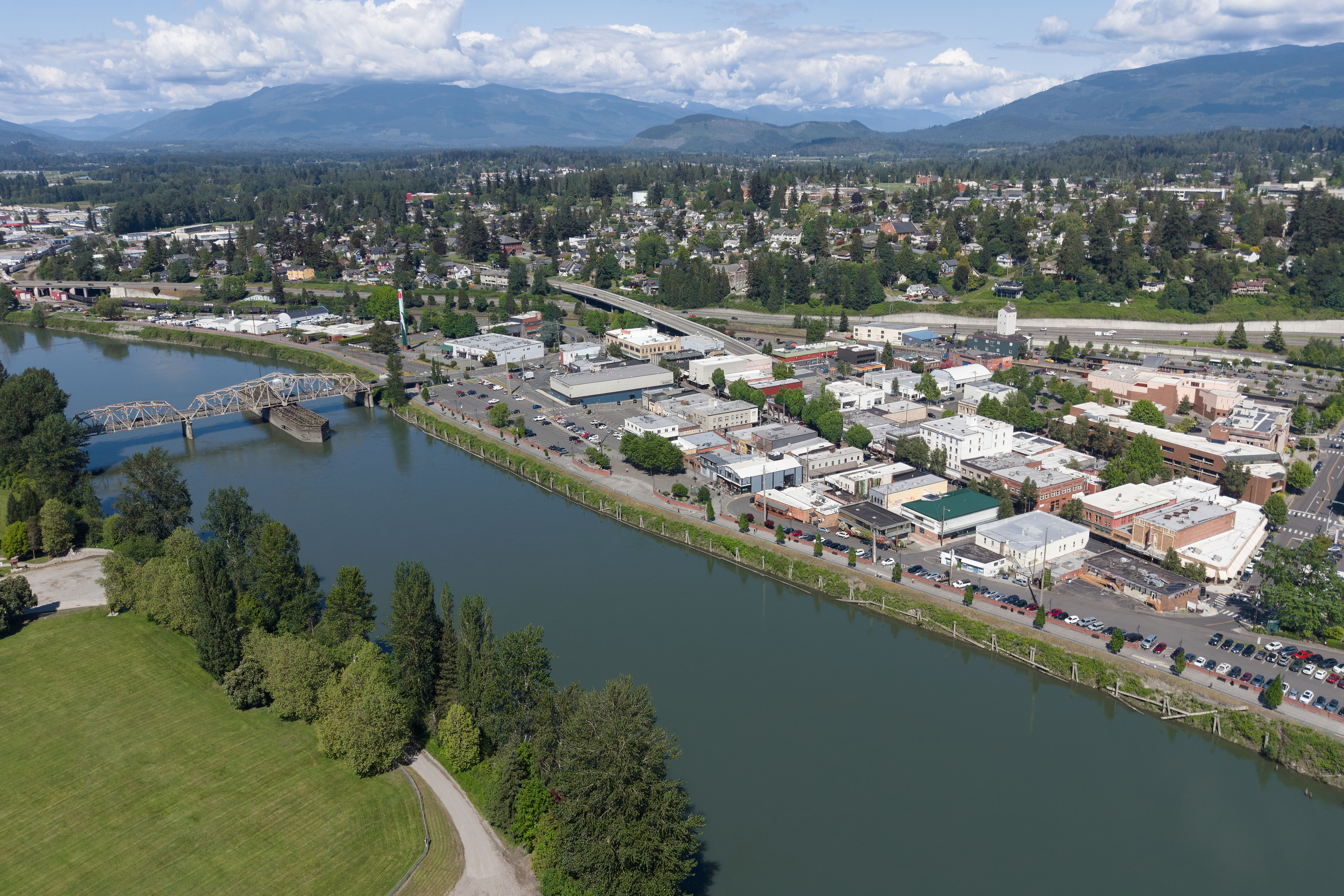
- Aerial view of Downtown Mount Vernon in 2026

- Flag

- Location of Mount Vernon in Washington State

- Location of Mount Vernon in the United States
- Coordinates: 48°25′13″N 122°18′42″W
- Country: United States
- State: Washington
- County: Skagit
- Incorporated: July 5, 1889
- Named for: Mount Vernon

Government
  - Type: Mayor–council
  - Mayor: Peter Donovan

Area
  - City: 12.63 sq mi (32.70 km^{2})
  - Land: 12.30 sq mi (31.85 km^{2})
  - Water: 0.32 sq mi (0.84 km^{2}) 2.58%
- Elevation: 197 ft (60 m)

Population (2020)
  - City: 35,219
  - Estimate (2024): 35,344
  - Density: 2,864/sq mi (1,105.7/km^{2})
  - Urban: 62,966 (US: 435th)
  - Metro: 130,696 (US: 313th)
- Time zone: UTC-8 (PST)
  - Summer (DST): UTC-7 (PDT)
- ZIP codes: 98273, 98274
- Area code: 360, 564
- GNIS feature ID: 2411183
- Website: mountvernonwa.gov

Mount Vernon is the county seat of and the most populous city in Skagit County, Washington, United States. A central location in the Skagit River Valley, the city is located 51 miles (82 km) south of the Canadian border and 60 miles (97 km) north of Seattle. The population was 35,219 at the 2020 census, making it the 35th most-populous city in Washington, with 62,966 people living in its urban area. It is one of two principal cities of and included in the Mount Vernon-Anacortes Metropolitan Statistical Area, covering most of Skagit County.

Mount Vernon and its surrounding areas are known for its annual Skagit Valley Tulip Festival, which has Mount Vernon host a street fair in downtown once a year, with millions of tulips grown in the Skagit Valley every year. Between the 2000 and 2020 census, Mount Vernon grew by 34.3%, and is a prominent location in Northwestern Washington, connected to neighboring communities via I-5 and Amtrak (with Skagit Station).

== History ==
=== Early days ===
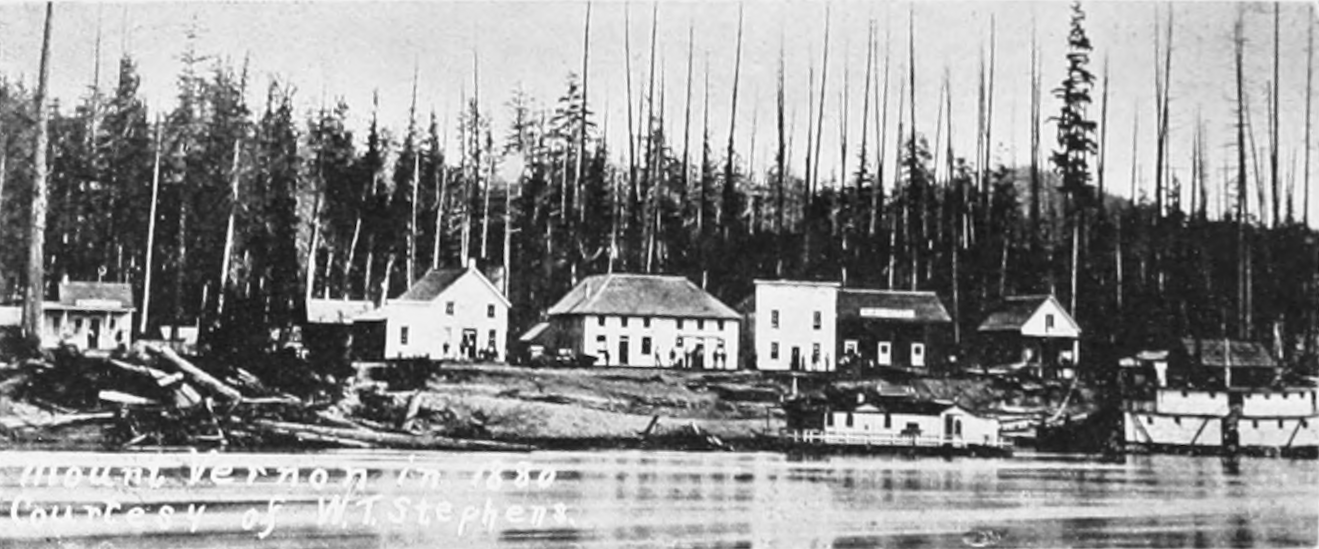
Mount Vernon in 1880

Jasper Gates and Joseph Dwelley first settled on the banks of the Skagit River, where the city of Mount Vernon now lies, in 1870. Later on, Harrison Clothier came to the community in 1877 to teach school and join in business with a former student, E.G. English. They were later recognized as the city's founders and pioneer businessmen. A post office was established in November 1877 with Clothier appointed postmaster. The city was named after Mount Vernon, the plantation estate and resting place of George Washington. The two men laid out the city's first plan while the area was still heavily timbered.

Mount Vernon's first industry was logging; camps were set up to log the townsite. The community grew quickly following the loggers, and hotels and saloons opened up along the Skagit River next to English & Clothiers' store. While poised to grow, river access to the community was stymied by a massive and ancient log jam in the river which prevented large ships from being able to port. Mail carriers instead had to paddle canoes down-stream to nearby Skagit City which enjoyed a brief period of prosperity thanks to this obstacle. The mining activity at nearby Ruby Creek spurred growth for a short time in 1880, gaining the city a new hotel, but little else was accomplished when the mines proved to be shallow. More logging operations were established but were not profitable due to the low price of logs at the time. By 1881, Mount Vernon's permanent population was a modest 75.

Growth in the 1880s was steady. In 1882, the Odd Fellows Lodge was established, followed by the first newspaper in 1884, The Skagit News. The first church, Baptist, was also established in 1884 but would not build a permanent building for several years. In November 1884, Mount Vernon's future was secured when it was chosen for the new Skagit County seat, taking the designation from La Conner. The Odd fellows building, built the following year, served the county's needs until a permanent building was built.

=== Railroad and growth into the 20th century ===
Mount Vernon's growth was helped by its central location in reference to the mining, logging and farming communities of the eastern and central parts of the county as well as its access to Puget Sound. The only thing it was lacking was a railroad connection to the outside world, especially, Everett, Seattle and Vancouver, B.C. A committee was appointed in 1889 to negotiate with railroads on line placement. Their efforts paid off when the Great Northern Railway agreed to lay their line through the city. This was completed in 1891. The city was also in the process of convincing the Seattle, Lake Shore and Eastern Railway to come to Mt. Vernon. This deal fell through after the railroad was acquired by Northern Pacific Railway who chose to lay tracks further east through Sedro-Woolley in 1896.

The railroad's arrival caused great commotion in Mount Vernon, bringing hundreds of new businesses and residents. Mount Vernon was officially incorporated on July 5, 1893. That same year, a large brick courthouse was built on Main street, which still stands today. Due to the area's stable economy, Mount Vernon never boomed in the 1890s like many other speculative settlements in the region, all vying for a railroad terminus. The city experienced its first of many fires in 1891 when several blocks along the waterfront were destroyed. The same year the city's riverfront eroded taking away Front Street and the west side of Main Street. The boost from the railroad's construction quickly replaced these buildings. 1891 also saw the construction of several large civic structures such as a large brick schoolhouse on the hill above the city as well as the Mount Vernon Opera House, designed by Peacock & Dalton.

Growth slowed considerably after the Panic of 1893. Following a large flood in 1894, the first dike was built along the Skagit River. Another great fire in 1900 wiped out all of Mount Vernon's original structures including English & Clothiers' store and the Ruby Hotel. Fire would destroy more downtown businesses in 1903. The city finally received a water system in 1902 after a failed attempt in 1894.

=== Later events and transportation ===
The city again grew in the 1910s when it became the southern terminus for the Bellingham & Skagit Railway's interurban railroad line, which would carry passengers as well as freight between Bellingham and Mount Vernon as well as Burlington and Sedro-Woolley. The line opened on August 31, 1912, with passenger trips to Bellingham every two hours during the day and freight operating at night. Mount Vernon business owners soon began pressuring the railway company, since renamed the Pacific Northwest Traction Company, to extend the rails south to connect with the interurban line in Everett. Plagued by a weakening economy, the onset of America's entrance into World War I in 1917, and numerous infrastructure failures that led to line closures for months at a time, extension of the interurban was put off indefinitely. The completion of the Pacific Highway between Seattle and Bellingham in 1920 posed a great threat to the still incomplete interurban line. After a series of accidents and bridge wash outs, passenger service on the money-losing line was permanently suspended in June 1930. In 1969, Interstate 5 was built through downtown, severing it from most of the residential district and opening the farm lands north of the city to urban development, where many of Mount Vernon's downtown businesses moved.

== Culture ==
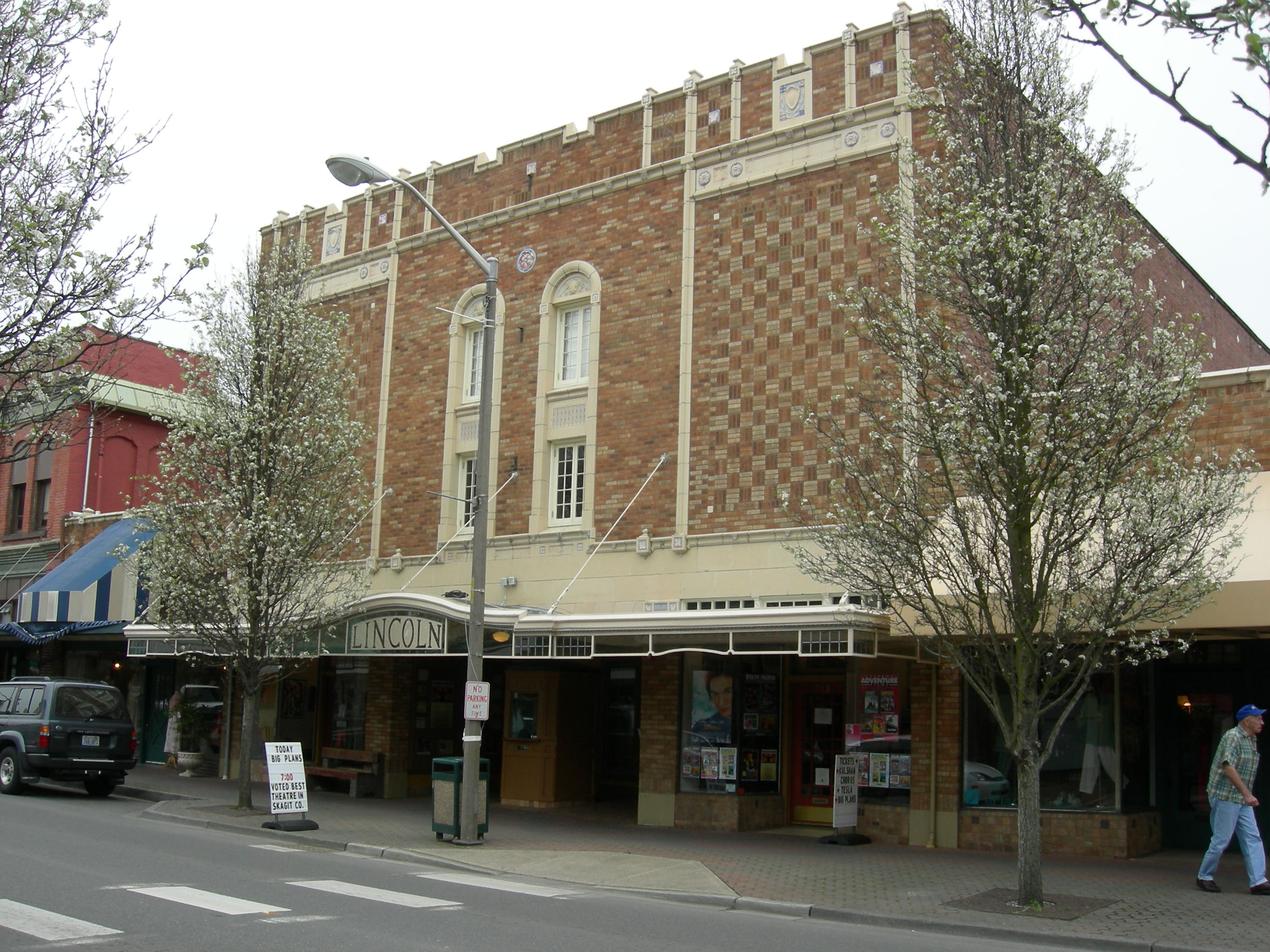
Lincoln Theatre

The Historic Lincoln Theatre on First Street in downtown Mount Vernon was originally built in 1926 as a vaudeville and silent movie house. Through the early 1980s, the Lincoln was a movie theater showing first-run films and now hosts live theatrical performances and concerts while also showcasing classic, as well as contemporary, movies year-round. The Lincoln is one of only 98 theaters in the United States that still possesses its original Wurlitzer theatre organ, which is often played prior to a show.

In addition, the Skagit Symphony resides in the area.

The city's public library was relocated to a new multi-use community center that opened in September 2024 at a cost of $56 million. The Mount Vernon Library Commons includes meeting spaces, a community center with a commercial kitchen, and a three-story parking garage with 275 stalls. The garage includes the largest municipally owned electric vehicle charging station in the United States with 76 stalls and several charging lockers for electric bicycles.

== Geography ==
According to the United States Census Bureau, the city has a total area of 12.62 square miles (32.69 km^{2}), of which, 12.30 square miles (31.86 km^{2}) is land and 0.33 square miles (0.85 km^{2}) is water.

=== Climate ===
Like much of the Pacific Northwest, according to the Köppen climate classification, Mount Vernon falls within a cool dry-summer subtropical zone (Csb), with "cool"-summer Mediterranean characteristics. Other sources classify it as belonging in the marine west coast climate (Köppen Cfb) zone, with cool, wet winters and warm, distinctly drier summers.

Climate data for Mount Vernon (1971–2000)
Month	Jan	Feb	Mar	Apr	May	Jun	Jul	Aug	Sep	Oct	Nov	Dec	Year
Mean daily maximum °F (°C)	45.7 (7.6)	49.5 (9.7)	53.4 (11.9)	58.1 (14.5)	64.0 (17.8)	68.4 (20.2)	73.0 (22.8)	74.1 (23.4)	69.1 (20.6)	60.0 (15.6)	50.9 (10.5)	46.0 (7.8)	59.4 (15.2)
Daily mean °F (°C)	39.9 (4.4)	42.7 (5.9)	45.7 (7.6)	49.3 (9.6)	54.7 (12.6)	58.9 (14.9)	62.3 (16.8)	62.9 (17.2)	58.3 (14.6)	50.9 (10.5)	44.5 (6.9)	40.3 (4.6)	50.9 (10.5)
Mean daily minimum °F (°C)	34.1 (1.2)	35.9 (2.2)	37.9 (3.3)	40.5 (4.7)	45.4 (7.4)	49.4 (9.7)	51.5 (10.8)	51.6 (10.9)	47.5 (8.6)	41.8 (5.4)	38.1 (3.4)	34.6 (1.4)	42.4 (5.8)
Average precipitation inches (mm)	4.22 (107)	2.85 (72)	2.81 (71)	2.53 (64)	2.42 (61)	1.95 (50)	1.20 (30)	1.34 (34)	1.70 (43)	2.89 (73)	4.83 (123)	3.96 (101)	32.7 (829)
Source: NOAA (normals, 1971–2000)

== Flood control and waterfront redevelopment ==
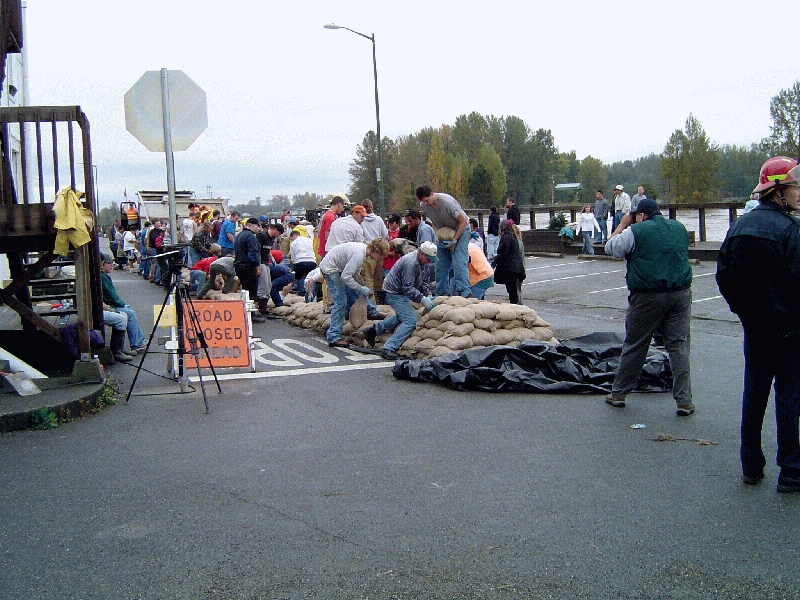
The Skagit River, which flows through Mount Vernon, is prone to flooding during periods of heavy rain in the Cascades. In October 2003 the townspeople of Mount Vernon turned out to build a sandbag dike along the river in anticipation of a flood.

Since this city was founded, the downtown area of Mount Vernon bordering the Skagit River has been plagued by flooding, especially during times of heavy rain. Historically, each time the water rose above a certain level, citizens had to work together to build a sandbag wall stretching six city blocks and as high as 5 feet (1.5 m).

In the spring of 2007, the city council authorized the mayor to purchase a mobile flood wall from Norway-based company AquaFence, the first such flood wall sold in the United States. The flood wall is 4 feet (1.2 m) high and can be assembled in as little as three hours by a handful of volunteers as opposed to the up to 12 hours and hundreds of volunteers required by the traditional sandbag wall.

A permanent flood wall was completed in 2019.

After adequate flood control is in place, a Citizens' Advisory Committee plans to enhance the city's use of the revetment, which is currently used mostly for parking and a seasonal farmer's market. Current plans call for a promenade with condos or mixed-use development facing the river. A two- or three-story parking garage is planned to replace the revetment parking lost due to development. During Thanksgiving 2017 the city, as well as Lyman and Hamilton, experienced flooding; and again on November 15, 2021.

== Transportation ==
Mount Vernon's main transportation hub is Skagit Station, built in 2004, which is served by Amtrak and bus operators. Commuters and travelers can switch between modes of transportation in downtown Mount Vernon. The station offers stops for Skagit Transit buses, Greyhound bus, Amtrak Cascades rail and local taxis. Skagit Transit operates a commuter bus to Everett Station that connects with the Sounder commuter train to Seattle.

Skagit Regional Airport, 5 mi (8.0 km) northwest, fills much of the area's general aviation needs. It has service on two cargo airlines. The closest commercial airport with scheduled passenger service is Bellingham International Airport, 25 miles (40 km) north.

=== Major highways ===
- I-5 runs north–south from the Mexican border to the Peace Arch at the Canadian border in Blaine and to the Surrey, British Columbia border-crossing. It connects Mount Vernon to Seattle, Portland, Eugene, Redding, Sacramento, Los Angeles and San Diego.
- State Route 9 runs parallel to I-5, linking Mount Vernon with Snohomish and Arlington to the south and Sedro-Woolley and the Canadian border near Sumas to the north.
- State Route 536 runs from SR 20 into downtown Mount Vernon and I-5.
- State Route 538 runs east–west from Interstate 5 to SR 9 at the Baker Heights neighborhood of Mount Vernon.

== Government and politics ==
The City of Mount Vernon is a code city and uses a Mayor-Council form of government. The Mayor is the chief executive and administrative officer for the City of Mount Vernon and oversees and manages all operations including: Finance, City Attorney, Information Services, Human Resources, Development Services, Library, Public Works, Parks and Enrichment Services, Police, and Fire Department. This includes a City staff of 235 full time employees, 56 part time/seasonal employees, and a total City budget of $70 million. The directly elected mayor serves a four-year term, with the next election being set to occur on November 4, 2027. Six of the seven city council members are elected by the three wards of Mount Vernon for staggered four-year terms. The seventh council member is elected at-large every two years. Incumbent Mayor of Mount Vernon Peter Donovan started his first term on December 23, 2023, succeeding three-term mayor Jill Boudreau.

Mount Vernon is represented by Representative Rick Larsen (D) in the U.S. House of Representatives representing the state's 2nd district, and represented in Olympia by the 40th, 39th, and 10th districts.

== Demographics ==
Historical population
Census	Pop.	Note	%±
1890	770		—
1900	1,120		45.5%
1910	2,381		112.6%
1920	3,341		40.3%
1930	3,690		10.4%
1940	4,278		15.9%
1950	5,230		22.3%
1960	7,921		51.5%
1970	8,804		11.1%
1980	13,009		47.8%
1990	17,647		35.7%
2000	26,232		48.6%
2010	31,743		21.0%
2020	35,219		11.0%
2024 (est.)	35,344		0.4%
U.S. Decennial Census; 2020 Census

The median income for a household in the city was $53,496. Males had a median income of $33,724 versus $27,244 for females. The per capita income for the city was $17,041. About 10.8% of families and 15.9% of the population were below the poverty line, including 18.9% of those under age 18 and 7.1% of those age 65 or over.

=== 2020 census ===
As of the 2020 census, Mount Vernon had a population of 35,219. The median age was 36.8 years. 24.8% of residents were under the age of 18 and 18.3% of residents were 65 years of age or older. For every 100 females there were 93.3 males, and for every 100 females age 18 and over there were 91.4 males age 18 and over.

99.6% of residents lived in urban areas, while 0.4% lived in rural areas.

There were 12,896 households in Mount Vernon, of which 33.1% had children under the age of 18 living in them. Of all households, 47.4% were married-couple households, 16.6% were households with a male householder and no spouse or partner present, and 28.0% were households with a female householder and no spouse or partner present. About 27.1% of all households were made up of individuals and 14.6% had someone living alone who was 65 years of age or older.

There were 13,457 housing units, of which 4.2% were vacant. The homeowner vacancy rate was 1.1% and the rental vacancy rate was 4.2%.

Racial composition as of the 2020 census
Race	Number	Percent
White	21,485	61.0%
Black or African American	356	1.0%
American Indian and Alaska Native	639	1.8%
Asian	1,292	3.7%
Native Hawaiian and Other Pacific Islander	192	0.5%
Some other race	6,213	17.6%
Two or more races	5,042	14.3%
Hispanic or Latino (of any race)	11,881	33.7%

=== 2010 census ===
As of the 2010 census, there were 31,743 people, 11,342 households, and 7,443 families residing in the city. The population density was 2,580.7 inhabitants per square mile (996.4/km^{2}). There were 12,058 housing units at an average density of 980.3 units per square mile (378.5 units/km^{2}). The racial makeup of the city was 72.8% White, 1.0% African American, 1.6% Native American, 2.7% Asian, 0.2% Pacific Islander, 17.6% from other races, and 4.0% from two or more races. Hispanic or Latino of any race were 33.7% of the population.

There were 11,342 households, of which 37.1% had children under the age of 18 living with them, 47.6% were married couples living together, 12.2% had a female householder with no husband present, 5.8% had a male householder with no wife present, and 34.4% were non-families. 26.8% of all households were made up of individuals, and 12% had someone living alone who was 65 years of age or older. The average household size was 2.74 and the average family size was 3.33.

The median age in the city was 32.3 years. 28.2% of residents were under the age of 18; 10.1% were between the ages of 18 and 24; 27.5% were from 25 to 44; 21.4% were from 45 to 64; and 12.7% were 65 years of age or older. The gender makeup of the city was 49.0% male and 51.0% female.

=== 2000 census ===
As of the 2000 census, there were 26,232 people, 9,276 households, and 6,205 families residing in the city. The population density was 2,360.6 people per square mile (911.4 people/km^{2}). There were 9,686 housing units at an average density of 871.6 units per square mile (336.5 units/km^{2}). The racial makeup of the city was 75.44% White, 0.73% African American, 1.02% Native American, 2.58% Asian, 0.15% Pacific Islander, 17.13% from other races, and 2.95% from two or more races. Hispanic or Latino of any race were 25.12% of the population.

There were 9,276 households, out of which 36.5% had children under the age of 18 living with them, 51.3% were married couples living together, 11.4% had a female householder with no husband present, and 33.1% were non-families. 26.1% of all households were made up of individuals, and 10.9% had someone living alone who was 65 years of age or older. The average household size was 2.75 and the average family size was 3.32.

In the city, the age distribution of the population shows 29.0% under the age of 18, 11.9% from 18 to 24, 29.0% from 25 to 44, 17.6% from 45 to 64, and 12.5% who were 65 years of age or older. The median age was 31 years. For every 100 females, there were 96.2 males. For every 100 females age 18 and over, there were 92.9 males.

== Education ==
The city is served by the Mount Vernon School District.

== Notable people ==
- Glenn Beck, American television and radio host
- Cheryl Bentyne, Grammy Award–winning singer
- Winnie Brinks, majority leader of the Michigan Senate
- Jim Caviezel, film and television actor
- Scott Clements, professional poker player
- Harriet Ball Dunlap, temperance leader
- Don Eldridge, businessman and politician
- R. Garcia y Robertson, fantasy and science fiction writer
- N. Bruce Hannay, Vice President of Bell Telephone Laboratories
- Mark Hendrickson, baseball and basketball player
- Oscar Jimenez, soccer player for Louisville City FC
- Kyle Kendrick, baseball pitcher for the Philadelphia Phillies
- Graham Kerr, culinary expert, known as "The Galloping Gourmet"
- Chad Lindberg, film and television actor
- Ross Mathews, Ross the Intern on the Tonight Show
- Colton Harris Moore Former fugitive known as the “Barefoot Bandit”
- T. J. Oshie, ice hockey player for the Washington Capitals
- Michael E. Pegram, owner of the race horse Real Quiet
- Jillian Speer, musician and singer
- Coady Willis, drummer

== Sister cities ==
Mount Vernon has the following Sister Cities, according to the Washington State Lt. Governor's office:

- Chilliwack, British Columbia, Canada

== See also ==
- Skagit City
