= Mason Transit Authority =

Public transit operator in Washington

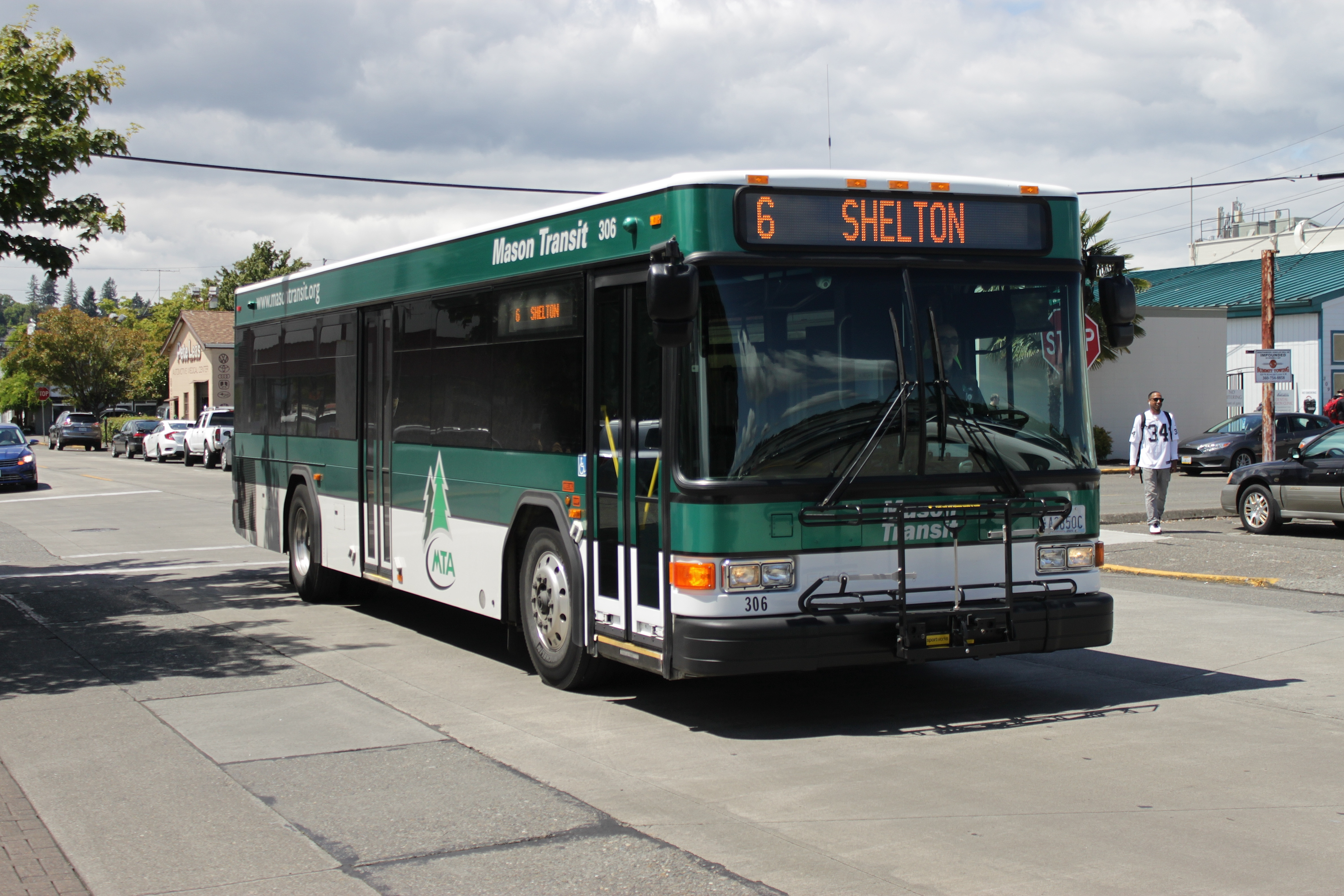
- MTA bus on route 6 in Olympia
- Commenced operation: December 1, 1992
- Headquarters: 790 E Johns Prairie Road; Shelton, WA 98584
- Locale: Mason County, Washington
- Service type: Bus service
- Routes: 9
- Fleet: 18 buses, 23 minibuses and 40 vans
- Annual ridership: 585,534 (2014)
- Fuel type: Diesel and Gasoline
- General Manager: Danette Brannin (Interim)
- Website: www.masontransit.org

The Mason Transit Authority (MTA), formerly the Mason County Transportation Authority, is the public transit authority of Mason County, Washington, United States. It operates free bus service within the county, connecting the city of Shelton, Hoodsport, Grapeview, Allyn, Belfair, the native tribal reservations of the Skokomish and Squaxin people, and paid commuter service to Olympia in Thurston County, Brinnon in Jefferson County, and Bremerton in Kitsap County. The agency also provides general public dial-a-ride service, operates a vanpool fleet, a worker/driver program that provides commuter service to the Puget Sound Naval Shipyard and Intermediate Maintenance Facility, volunteer driver program for senior transportation, a supplemental service that is an after school activity bus and a community van program.

== History ==
Public transit in Mason County was conceived with the establishment of a public transportation benefit area (PTBA) on September 22, 1987. After two unsuccessful attempts at approving the PTBA in 1985 and 1988, a countywide vote on November 15, 1991, approved the Mason County Public Transportation Benefit Area and a sales tax of 0.2% to fund public transportation. Buses began operating on December 1, 1992.

The Mason County Transit Authority officially changed its name to Mason Transit Authority in 2013.

In 2015, the agency was named the Rural Transit System of the Year by the Community Transit Association of America, citing the completion of the county's transit-community center.

== Facilities ==
=== Transit-Community Center ===
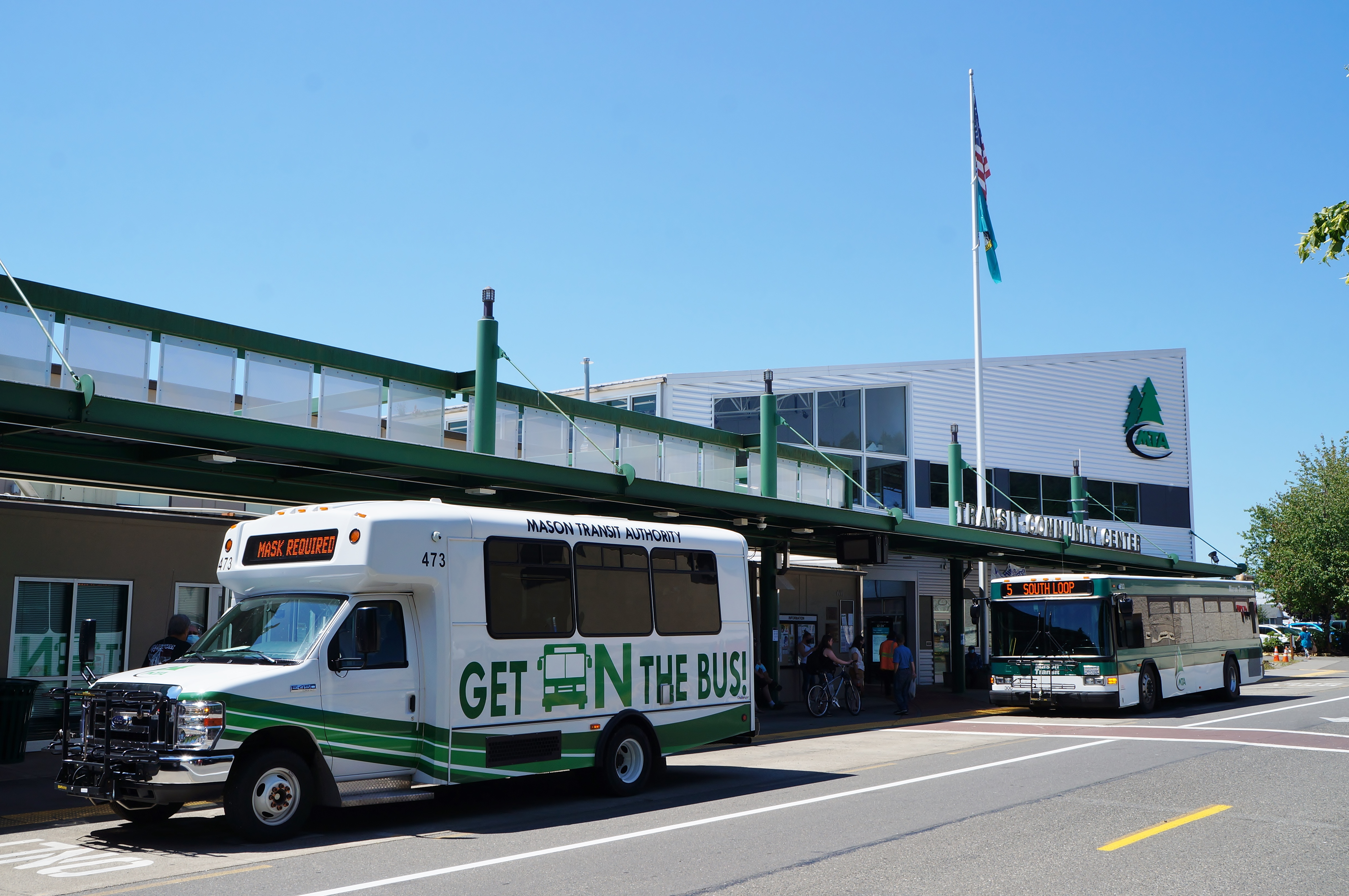
The Transit-Community Center in Shelton

The Transit-Community Center is a combined community center and transit center located in Shelton that opened on April 1, 2015. It was originally a Washington National Guard armory built in the 1950s that was purchased by the MTA in 2006 and renovated at a cost of $9.9 million, funded by local sales tax and funding from the Federal Transit Administration.

== Services ==
=== Fares ===
Since its founding, MTA provided fare-free service for trips within Mason County; until 2023, it charged $1.50 for trips that traveled into neighboring counties. Youth fares were removed in September 2022 as part of a statewide transit initiative. On January 1, 2023, MTA removed all fares for fixed route and dial-a-ride services as part of a three-year pilot; the $2.50 fare for worker/driver routes to the Puget Sound Naval Shipyard remained in place.

=== Routes ===
Route	Inbound terminus	Outbound terminus	Destinations served	Saturday service	Notes
1	Shelton Transit-Community Center	Belfair	Allyn	Yes	
3	Belfair	Bremerton	Gorst	Yes	
4	Loop around Belfair			Yes	
5	Loop around southern Shelton		Shelton Transit-Community Center	Yes	
6	Shelton Transit-Community Center	Olympia Transit Center	Kamilche	Yes	
7	Loop around northern Shelton		Shelton Transit-Community Center	Yes	
8	Shelton	Brinnon	Hoodsport	Yes	
11	Shelton Transit-Community Center	Lake Cushman Maintenance Office	Shelton Transit-Community Center, Walmart, Hoodsport, Lake Cushman Maintenance Office	Yes	
21	Shelton Matlock Park P&R	Belfair	Allyn	No	One inbound trip only.
23	Belfair	Bremerton	Belfair Park and Ride	No	One round trip only.
Zipper	Loop around northern Shelton.		Shelton Transit Community Center	No	
Pilot	Shelton Transit Community Center	McCleary	Kamilche	No	Pilot

=== Connecting services ===
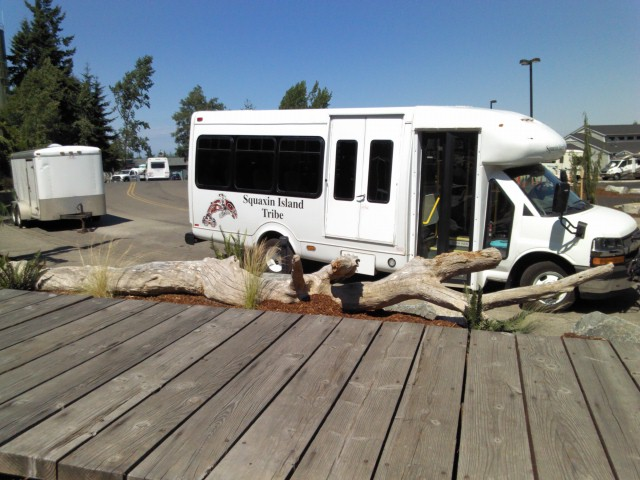
A Squaxin Transit bus, one of the services that connects to MTA

- Kitsap Transit and Washington State Ferries in Bremerton (via route 3)
- Intercity Transit and Grays Harbor Transit in Olympia (via route 6)
- Squaxin Transit in Kamilche (via route 6)
- Jefferson Transit in Brinnon (via route 8)
- Grays Harbor Transit in McCleary (via Route P)

== Fleet ==
=== Current Bus Fleet ===
As of October 20, 2014

Year	Manufacturer	Model	Fleet numbers	Fuel type	Notes
1980	MCI	MC-5C	904	Diesel	
1999	Gillig	Phantom 40'	805–806	Diesel	
2002	Gillig	Phantom 35'	807	Diesel	
2003	Gillig	Phantom 30'	808	Diesel	
2005	Gillig	Phantom 35'	809–810	Diesel	
2005	Gillig	Phantom 40'	811–812	Diesel	
2007	Gillig	Advantage 35'	300–302	Diesel	
2010	Gillig	Advantage 35'	303–305	Diesel	
2013	Gillig	Advantage 35'	306	Diesel	
