= Intercity Transit =

Local public transit operator in Thurston County, Washington

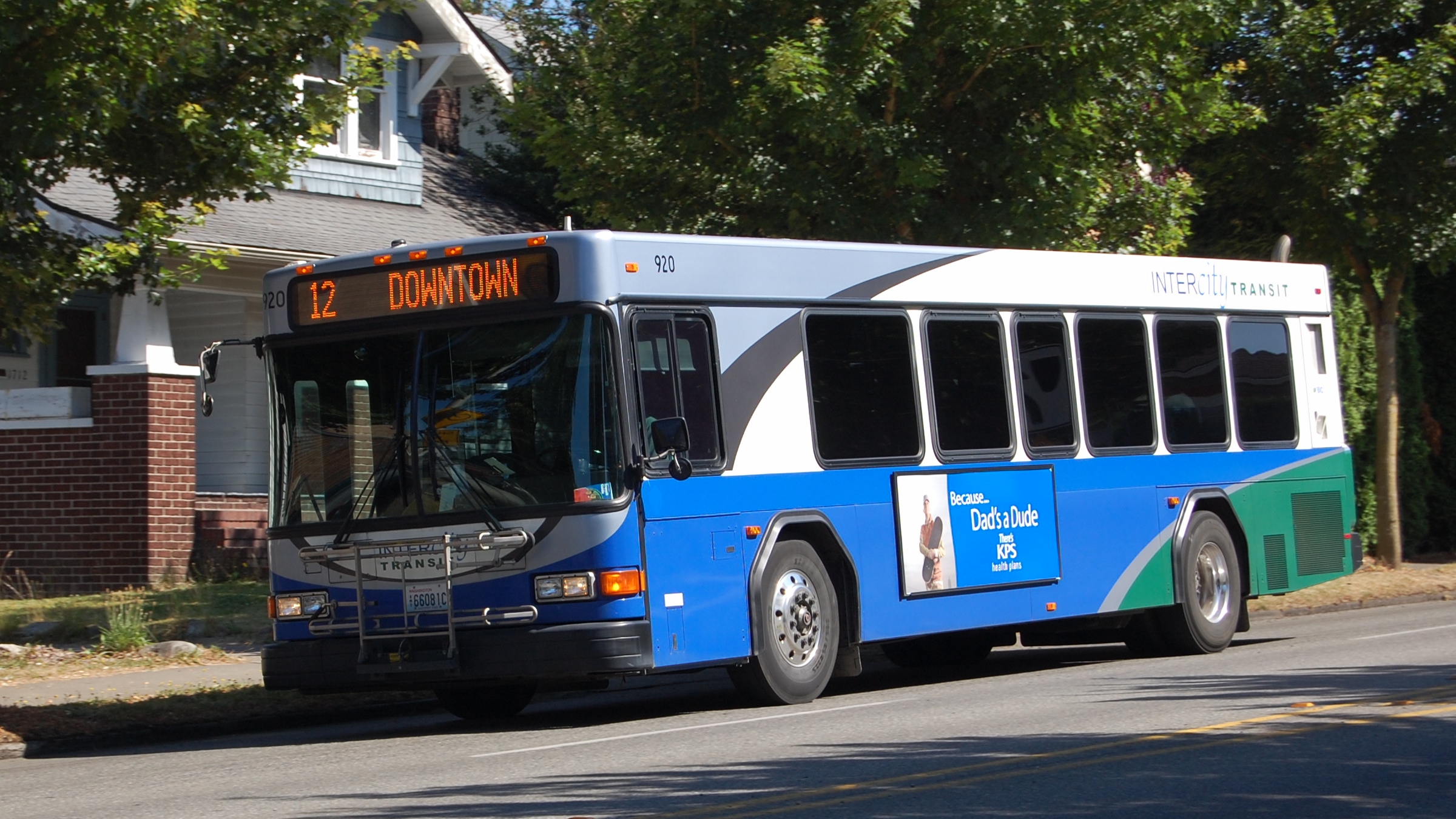
- Founded: 1969
- Headquarters: 510 Pattison Street Southeast; Olympia, Washington
- Locale: Thurston County, Washington, U.S.
- Service type: Bus service, paratransit, vanpool
- Routes: 30
- Stops: 961
- Fleet: 84 transit buses, 54 paratransit buses
- Daily ridership: 15,858 (weekdays, 2025)
- Annual ridership: 5,171,020 (2025)
- Fuel type: Diesel, diesel–electric hybrid
- General manager: Emily Bergkamp
- Annual budget: $195.5 million (2026)
- Employees: 588 (2026)
- Website: intercitytransit.com

Intercity Transit is a public transit system that serves Thurston County, Washington, United States. It is based in Olympia and serves nearby cities, including Lacey and Tumwater, as well as regional connections to Lakewood. The agency is a special-purpose government district with a public transportation benefit area that collects a 1.2 percent sales tax within parts of Thurston County. Intercity Transit has 30 bus routes and also provides paratransit and vanpool service. It carried 5.2 million total trips in 2025.

The agency was established in October 1969 as a three-city commission to subsidize an existing private bus system operated by the Olympia Transit Company. The company had begun service in 1933 as the successor to a local streetcar system and sold its assets directly to Intercity Transit in 1972. The commission was replaced by a public transportation benefit area that was approved by voters in September 1980 and took over Intercity Transit on January 1, 1981. The service area was expanded to all of Thurston County in 1992 but later reverted to only the urbanized portions of the county after major budget cuts in 2000.

Intercity Transit has been a fare-free system since 2020.

== History ==
A streetcar system was operated in Olympia and Tumwater from 1890 to 1933 by private companies that were later consolidated into the utility Puget Sound Power and Light. The system initially used horse-drawn carts but were switched to electric trains in 1892. They were replaced by motor buses on December 1, 1933, operated under a city franchise granted to the new Olympia Transit Company after Puget Sound Power and Light had agreed to relinquish their rights to transit service in Olympia. The Olympia Transit Company began to have financial issues and took on subsidies from the Downtown Olympia chamber of commerce as well as the Thurston County Council for the Aging. The company informed the Olympia city government in early 1969 that it would potentially discontinue all service, leading to discussions about a public subsidy or takeover.

In September 1969, voters in Olympia and Tumwater approved a household utility tax to fund a transit system that would primarily subsidize the existing Olympic Transit Company. The Intercity Transit Commission was formed by the two cities in October and was joined a month later by Lacey after the city's voters approved a similar household utility tax. An agreement with the Olympia Transit Company was reached on December with a subsidized rate of 68 cents per route-mile paid by the commission, which had been amended after negotiations with bus drivers. The city of Lacey objected to the initial service plan, which had one route that served a portion of the city, and threatened to withdraw from the commission. Bus service to Lacey was discontinued on March 15, 1970, and returned in January 1973 after city voters approve a separate transit tax measure and an agreement to increase the number of daily trips to 18.

Intercity Transit formally took over operations from the Olympia Transit Company in 1972 and began expanding service in the three-city region. The agency also purchased six buses with grant from the a federal government and began construction of its own bus garage. A proposal in 1975 to create a public transportation benefit area (PTBA) and sales tax to fund Intercity Transit service across all of Thurston County was rejected by the county commissioners. The transit commission continued to operate buses and hired its first full-time general manager in 1976 to replace a position within the Olympia city government. In 1979, a study into a county PTBA began alongside an unsuccessful attempt to raise the sales tax to 0.3 percent. The PTBA was approved by voters in the three cities and some outlying rural areas on September 16, 1980, along with a 0.3 percent sales tax and a larger portion of the state's motor vehicle excise tax. The Thurston County Public Transportation Benefit Area was established in October 1980 and absorbed Intercity Transit through a transfer of assets and service agreements at the end of the year. The PTBA took over formal control of the transit system on January 1, 1981, and retained the Intercity Transit name. It expanded to the Evergreen State College, where passenger fares for students were partially subsidized by the college, in July 1981 along with other rural corridors.

Olympia Transit Center opened in 1994 and serves as the main hub of Intercity Transit

Ridership on Intercity Transit exceeded 2 million passengers for the first time in 1982. The agency partnered with Pierce Transit to launch an inter-county express route between Olympia and Lakewood in April 1988. The route was later extended to Tacoma and added an intermediate stop at Fort Lewis and Madigan Army Medical Center. The PTBA boundaries were expanded in May 1992 to encompass all of Thurston County after voters in unincorporated areas and rural cities approved the 0.3 percent sales tax rate. The expansion resulted in increased ridership but caused friction among staff internally and led to a restructuring of the agency's departments and leadership. Intercity Transit opened its main hub, the Olympia Transit Center, on August 28, 1994, after seven years of planning and construction. It includes 11 bus bays, a covered waiting area, a two-story customer service center, and public restrooms. The Lacey Transit Center opened the following year to replace a transit hub at the South Sound Center shopping mall. A proposed increase to 0.5 percent was rejected by voters in March 1999 and followed by the removal of the motor vehicle excise tax in response to Initiative 695. The agency's employees were also fined $60,000 for violating the state's campaign finance laws after using public facilities to promote the March 1999 ballot measure. Intercity Transit relied on the motor vehicle excise tax for 42 percent of its operating budget and began to make large cuts to service in February 2000, when it eliminated 14 of its 37 routes as well as all Sunday and express service. The agency also laid off 40 percent of its workforce and suspended work on its plans to build additional transit centers in western Olympia and Hawks Prairie.

Fares were increased twice over the following two years to reduce the agency's budget shortfall. Intercity Transit announced plans in January 2002 to remove rural areas from its service area and withdraw buses from Rochester and Tenino. The boundary change was approved by a special commission in April and would take effect at the end of September. The agency then proposed a 0.3 percent sales tax increase for the September 17 primary election to avoid further cuts and instead restore some of the service that had been eliminated in 2000. The ballot measure was narrowly approved by voters and the sales tax increase took effect in January 2003. Intercity Transit increased its service by 30 percent in the following two years and restored 30-minute frequency on several routes. The agency reintroduced its downtown Olympia shuttle, named Dash, in February 2006 to connect the Washington State Capitol Campus to landmarks and remote parking lots. Intercity Transit purchased 23 new buses between 2006 and 2007 to replace older coaches and expand the fleet to prepare for frequency increases on several routes. The system carried over 5 million passengers in 2008 due to the effects of higher gasoline prices during the Great Recession. In 2009, Intercity Transit was named an Outstanding Public Transportation System in the mid-size category by the American Public Transportation Association. The award cited the agency's 50 percent increase in ridership over a three-year period and its large vanpool and paratransit programs.

Voters approved a 0.2 percent sales tax increase for Intercity Transit in August 2010 as part of a plan to avoid cuts during the Great Recession, which had affected retail sales. The agency took over all of the inter-county express service between Olympia and Tacoma in October 2011 after Pierce Transit withdrew service; Pierce Transit had previously operated 16 of the 48 daily trips on the corridor. The withdrawal also marked the end of ORCA card acceptance on Intercity Transit buses, which were shown to drivers but did not provide a fare to the agency due to the lack of equipment for the system. Intercity Transit partnered with Sound Transit to provide direct express bus service from Olympia to Downtown Seattle from September 2013 to June 2017. The route was funded for four years by a grant from the Washington State Department of Transportation that allowed Sound Transit to operate service outside its taxing district. Intercity Transit began planning for an additional sales tax increase that would be enabled through the state legislature. After two unsuccessful attempts, a bill to authorize a higher sales tax ceiling for the agency was passed by the legislature in March 2018. Proposition 1, which would raise the sales tax by 0.4 percent to a total of 1.2 percent, was approved by voters on November 6, 2018, with over 65 percent in favor.

The first major change under Proposition 1 was the creation of the "One", a limited-stop bus route on Martin Way between Capital Mall, Downtown Olympia, and Lacey. It entered service on November 11, 2019, and operated as a fare-free express bus during peak periods with only 10 stops compared to 30 stops with a transfer on the old routes. Intercity Transit described it as the precursor to a bus rapid transit system and partially funded the route with a $4.5 million grant from the state government. The agency eliminated fares on all of its services on January 1, 2020, after it found that the cost of collecting fares and implementing a new smart card system would have exceeded farebox revenue. Ridership rose by 40 percent in the first two months compared to the previous year as a result of the fare-free program. The COVID-19 pandemic and subsequent stay-at-home orders issued by the state government in March 2020 resulted in several rounds of service reduction and a 60 percent decrease in ridership. Intercity Transit suspended all of its fixed bus routes on April 13 and switched to a temporary on-demand system with reservations made in advance and limited only to passengers with "essential business". The reservation-only system was implemented in response to the use of buses by passengers without destinations who did not obey public health guidance and had become hostile with workers.

By May, the reservation-only system had completed 18,000 trips. Limited service on the fixed bus routes resumed on June 21 with hourly frequencies on most routes; the Dash shuttle, the One express bus, and inter-county routes to Pierce County remained suspended. Olympia Transit Center and Lacey Transit Center were both closed to the public and bus bays were temporarily relocated to nearby streets. Ridership remained 70 percent below its 2019 levels on fixed routes and 55 percent below for paratransit; the reservation-only system booked 2,400 trips in July 2020. The One resumed service in September 2020 with all-day service at 30-minute frequencies to supplement other service on Martin Way. Inter-county express service to Lakewood resumed in July 2021. By late 2023, service had reached 80 percent of its pre-pandemic levels and ridership had recovered to 92 percent. A major restructure of the Intercity Transit system was completed in May 2026 to add more service on high-ridership corridors and eliminate less-used routes. "The One" was replaced by route 9X, a more conventional express route on the corridor that continued to be funded with state grants.

== Services ==
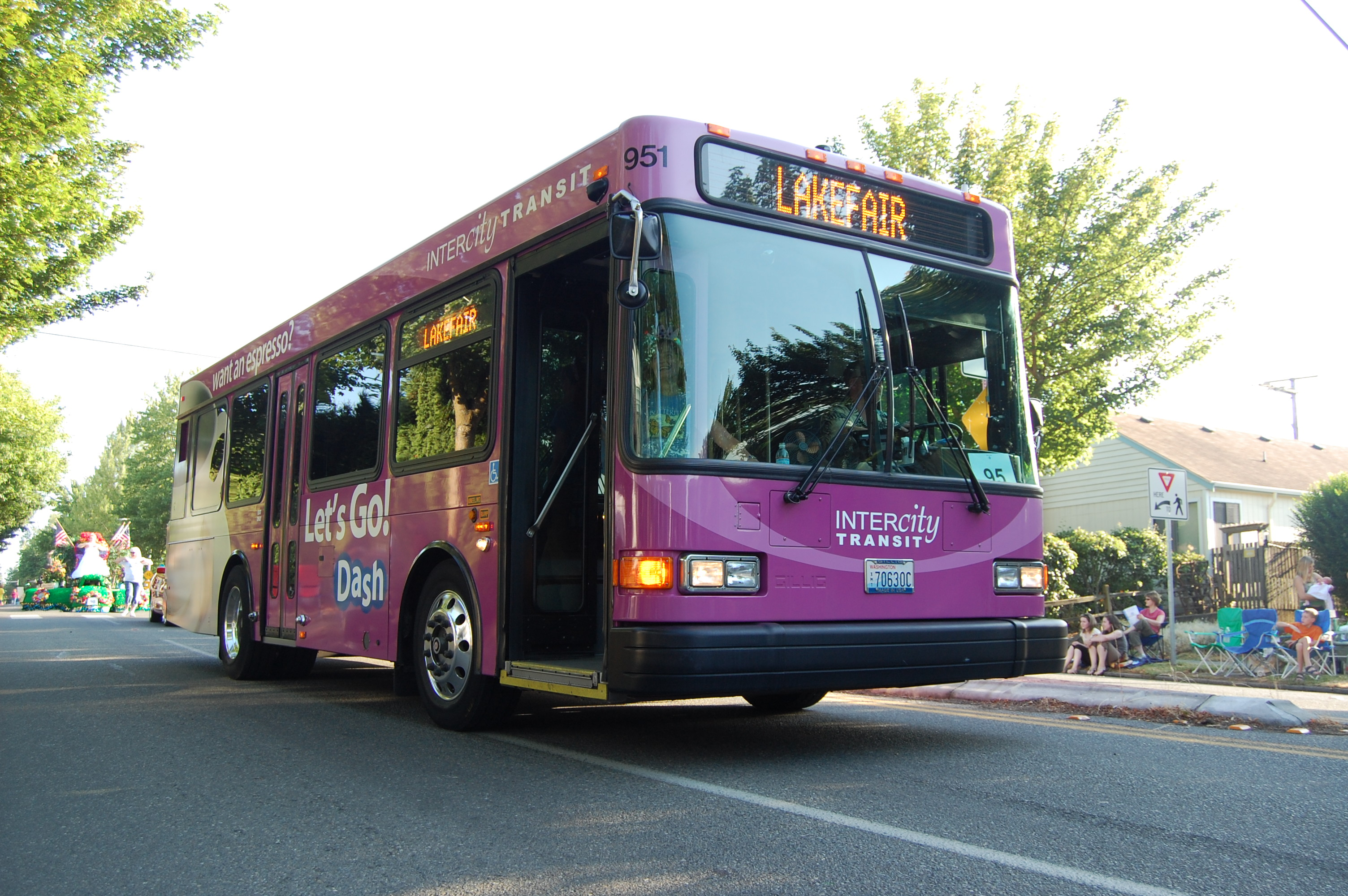
Intercity Transit "Dash" bus running in the Lakefair parade

Intercity Transit has a service area of 101 square miles (260 km^{2}) in the urban areas of Thurston County, primarily the cities of Lacey, Olympia, Tumwater, and Yelm. The agency's services carried 5.2 million total trips in 2025 and had an average weekday ridership of 15,858 passengers. Intercity Transit has 30 bus routes that converge on two major hubs: Olympia Transit Center and Lacey Transit Center. The bus routes generally run 7 days per week with frequencies of 30 minutes for most of the weekday and weekend; route 9X is a designated high-frequency corridor that has service every 15 minutes at certain times. The agency also operates Dial-A-Lift, a paratransit system with door-to-door service to areas near existing bus routes. Intercity Transit has a vanpool program with 155 registered groups that can be matched through an online system as well as a specialized van program for low-income households and social services.

Olympia Transit Center is the system's main hub and is also served by intercity routes operated by other agencies. These include Grays Harbor Transit to Aberdeen, Mason Transit Authority to Shelton, and Lewis County Transit to Centralia. Intercity Transit has express buses from Olympia and Lacey that travel north to Lakewood, where it shares stops with Pierce Transit and Sound Transit Express buses. The routes also connect to Sounder commuter rail at Lakewood station. Two other routes connect Olympia and Lacey with Amtrak trains at Centennial Station in southern Lacey.

A special Nightline route serves the Evergreen State College campus on weekends during the school year with hourly service from midnight to 3 a.m. From 2006 to 2020, Intercity Transit ran a shuttle route called Dash, which provided fare-free service between the Washington State Capitol Campus and Downtown Olympia. It ran every 12 minutes on weekdays during the legislative session and 15 minutes at other times to connect landmarks to public parking lots and other routes. The Dash shuttle was suspended during the COVID-19 pandemic and never resumed.

=== Fares ===
Intercity Transit began a five-year zero-fare pilot project in January 2020 as part of its service expansion approved in the 2018 ballot measure. The fare-free pilot was extended to 2028 due to the COVID-19 pandemic.

=== Programs ===
In addition to their transit services, Intercity Transit runs the Village Vans program to provide free transportation for low-income residents in its service area. The vans program began in 2003 and is primarily used for employment-related trips. The agency also promotes the use of bicycle commuting with classes on riding and maintenance, helmet distribution, and refurbishment of bicycles for donation. Intercity Transit is the main sponsor of the Bicycle Community Challenge (BCC), an annual event that promotes cycling in Thurston County during the month of May. The contest began in 1988 and has been sponsored by the agency since 2006. The 2015 edition of the contest had 1,736 registered participants who logged a combined 13,661 trips on bicycles.

== Administration ==
Intercity Transit is officially the Thurston County Public Transportation Benefit Area, a special-purpose district that was incorporated as a public transportation benefit area in 1981. It is governed by the Intercity Transit Authority, a board of directors with nine members: elected officials from the four cities in the public transportation benefit area; one representative from the Thurston County Board of Commissioners; one representative from a labor organization; and three representatives from the community who are appointed by the board. The board has one regular meeting per month and can call for special meetings as needed. A separate body, the Community Advisory Committee, has 20 members who represent the wider community and provide feedback on the agency's actions and policies.

The agency has a 2026 budget of $195.5 million. Approximately 75 percent of its revenue is derived from a 1.2 percent sales tax levied on purchases within the public transportation benefit area. Intercity Transit has 588.5 staffed positions (full-time equivalent) organized into five general departments with their own divisions. A general manager oversees the entirety of the agency; Emily Bergkamp has been the general manager since 2023, when her predecessor retired. Intercity Transit is based at an administration and operations facility in eastern Olympia that was built in 1985 and completed a major expansion in 2022. The agency's operators and customer service representatives are members of the Amalgamated Transit Union, which negotiates a collective bargaining agreement on a regular basis.

== Fleet ==
Intercity Transit has a fleet of 84 transit buses, 54 paratransit minibuses, and 197 vanpool vans. The entire bus fleet comprises Gillig Low Floor coaches that are in lengths of 35 feet (11 m) and 40 feet (12 m) with a seating capacity of 31 to 37 passengers. All of the buses are low-floor and have accessible "kneeling" entrances, wheelchair ramps, and automatic stop announcements. Intercity Transit buses had exterior advertisements until 2019, when they were phased out in response to low revenue and their use by political campaigns. Several campaigns had incited controversy after appearing on the buses, including anti-abortion campaigns and a pro-marijuana advertisement for Olympia Hempfest that advocated for legalization. The agency limited advertisements on some services, such as alcoholic products and nude dance clubs, as well as obscene or defamatory content.

The agency uses a fuel blend of 5 percent biodiesel and 95 percent ultra-low-sulfur diesel for its buses and propane for some of its Dial-a-Lift paratransit minibuses. They began using biodiesel in 2002 and expanded to an experimental 40 percent mixture by 2006. Intercity Transit introduced its first set of six diesel–electric hybrid buses in August 2010 using a portion of the federal funding from the American Recovery and Reinvestment Act of 2009. The agency received five hydrogen fuel cell buses from New Flyer in 2025 as part of a zero-emissions program and plans to construct a hydrogen fueling station in Olympia.
