= Pacific Transit System =

Public transit operator in Pacific County, Washington

Pacific Transit
- Commenced operation: January 2, 1980
- Locale: Pacific County, Washington
- Service type: Bus service
- Routes: 5
- Annual ridership: 55,150 (2023)
- Fuel type: Diesel and Gasoline
- Director: Joe Clark
- Website: www.pacifictransit.org

Pacific Transit is a rural public transit operator in Pacific County, Washington. It operates 5 routes in the county, connecting to adjacent systems in Aberdeen and Astoria, Oregon.

== History ==
A public transportation benefit area for Pacific County was created on August 8, 1979. A 0.3 percent sales tax was approved by voters in November 1979, and bus service began on January 2, 1980, through contracts with Grays Harbor Transit and Washington Coast Lines. By 2006, the system had 500 daily passengers and a staff of 25 employees. Pacific Transit eliminated the collection of fares on its routes in March 2025; adult passengers were previously charged between $1 and $1.50 for intra-county service and $2.50 for the Aberdeen Express. The agency also reached an agreement with Lewis County Transit to be jointly administered by their director, Joe Clark, through the end of the year until a permanent replacement for Pacific Transit's director is found.

In June 2025, Pacific Transit introduced a new network that replaced numbered routes with color-coded names. The service change also eliminated direct service from Ilwaco to Aberdeen, along with intra-county service from Ilwaco to South Bend.

== Operations ==
Pacific Transit is a public transportation benefit area corporation that is governed by an eight-member board of directors and funded by a 0.3 percent sales tax levied within Pacific County.

== Routes ==
In addition to fixed-route service, Pacific Transit also runs the "Veterans Connect", a free dial-a-ride bus for veterans that launched in 2024. It covers trips that originate in Pacific County and are needed for appointments and services in the surrounding area, including in Astoria, Oregon, Olympia, Washington, and Vancouver, Washington.

== Fleet ==
=== Current Bus Fleet ===
As of June 2014

Year	Manufacturer	Model	Fleet numbers	Fuel type	Notes
1998	Gillig	Phantom	23	Diesel	
2000	Gillig	Phantom	26–27	Diesel	
2011	Gillig	Advantage	29–34	Diesel	
