= Public transportation benefit area =

Public transit operators in Washington state

A public transportation benefit area, abbreviated as PTBA, is a type of public-benefit corporation for public transit operators in the U.S. state of Washington. It was authorized in 1975 along with a funding mechanism that uses sales taxes levied within a district. As of 2025, there are 21 PTBAs that cover most of Washington's counties and large cities, with the exception of Seattle.

Public transportation benefit areas are defined by Revised Code of Washington Chapter 36.57A, and are described as special taxing districts created solely for the purpose of funding public transportation. Within Washington state, there are 31 systems that cover all or parts of 23 counties and serve 132 cities. The majority of transit systems in the state are operated by public transportation benefit areas, with the exception of King County Metro (a metropolitan county system) and Sound Transit (a regional transit authority) in the Seattle metropolitan area; as well as county transportation authorities in Columbia County and Grays Harbor County; and city-owned systems in Everett, Pullman, and Yakima. Only two PTBAs serve more than one county: Ben Franklin Transit in Benton and Franklin counties; and Link Transit in Chelan and Douglas counties. These systems are allowed up to 15 members on their board of directors.

PTBAs are granted the authority to impose a voter-authorized sales tax of up to 0.9 percent within its boundaries with some exceptions. Community Transit, the PTBA of Snohomish County, was granted a sales tax limit of 1.2 percent in 2015 after exhausting the existing 0.9 percent limit. PTBAs with boundaries on the Puget Sound are also authorized to provide passenger ferry service in addition to traditional bus, paratransit and vanpool services. PTBAs are governed by a board of directors of not more than nine elected officials, supplemented by a union representative. In Thurston County, the board is allowed to have citizen members; in Mason County, elected officials on the board include representatives from school boards, fire districts, and hospital districts.

A special type of PTBA for unincorporated areas within counties, called unincorporated transportation benefit areas. Garfield County had the last active unincorporated transportation benefit area until it was converted into a county authority in 2016.

== History ==
On July 1, 1975, Governor Daniel J. Evans signed Engrossed Substitute Senate Bill No. 2280 into law, creating the PTBA. The bill had been proposed by the Snohomish County Transportation Authority (SNO-TRAN), who would later use the legislation to establish the state's first PTBA, the Snohomish County Public Transportation Benefit Area Corporation, later renamed Community Transit, in November 1975. Fourteen PTBAs were created from 1975 to 1980, but several had yet to begin operating. Several city systems remained operational, while more rural areas formed PTBAs.

== List of public transportation benefit areas ==
As of 2025, Washington has 21 public transportation benefit areas that serve a total population of over 4 million residents.

Agency	Established	Area	Population	Jurisdiction	Fixed-route ridership (2025)	Sales tax rate	Website
Asotin County PTBA	May 27, 2003	636 sq mi (1,647 km^{2})	22,750	Asotin County	52,226	0.2%	ridethevalley.org
Ben Franklin Transit	May 11, 1981	618 sq mi (1,601 km^{2})	290,240	Central Benton County and Pasco in Franklin County	2,846,477	0.6%	bft.org
C-Tran	November 4, 1980	627 sq mi (1,624 km^{2})	461,659	Clark County	4,674,940	0.7%	c-tran.com
Clallam Transit	July 24, 1979	1,753 sq mi (4,540 km^{2})	78,650	Clallam County	828,156	0.6%	clallamtransit.com
Community Transit	June 1, 1976	1,308 sq mi (3,388 km^{2})	644,949	Snohomish County (excluding Everett)	8,616,469	1.2%	communitytransit.org
Grant Transit Authority	November 1996	2,679 sq mi (6,939 km^{2})	106,250	Grant County	135,021	0.2%	gta-ride.com
Intercity Transit	September 16, 1980	97 sq mi (251 km^{2})	321,349	Olympia, Lacey, Tumwater and Yelm in Thurston County	4,804,514	1.2%	intercitytransit.com
Island Transit	November 4, 1980	208 sq mi (539 km^{2})	88,700	Island County	320,822	0.9%	islandtransit.org
Jefferson Transit	November 4, 1980	1,803 sq mi (4,670 km^{2})	33,825	Jefferson County	273,132	0.9%	jeffersontransit.com
Kitsap Transit	May 16, 1978	395 sq mi (1,023 km^{2})	288,900	Kitsap County	1,679,930	1.1% (Note: 0.3% of the PTBA rate is allocated for Kitsap Fast Ferries service.)	kitsaptransit.com
Lewis County Transit (Note: Until 2024, Lewis County Transit was named Twin Transit.)	November 2, 1976	13.1 sq mi (34 km^{2})	26,245	Centralia and Chehalis in Lewis County	247,853	0.2%	lewiscountytransit.org
Link Transit	November 21, 1989	3,500 sq mi (9,065 km^{2})	123,176	Chelan and Douglas counties	1,304,081	0.5%	linktransit.com
Mason Transit Authority	November 15, 1991	968 sq mi (2,507 km^{2})	67,800	Mason County	547,088	0.6%	masontransit.org
Pacific Transit System	November 6, 1979	933 sq mi (2,416 km^{2})	23,950	Pacific County	56,373	0.3%	pacifictransit.org
Pierce Transit	November 6, 1979	292 sq mi (756 km^{2})	612,378	Central and northern Pierce County	7,039,888	0.6%	piercetransit.org
RiverCities Transit	September 15, 1987	27 sq mi (70 km^{2})	51,470	Kelso and Longview in Cowlitz County	298,138	0.3%	rctransit.org
Skagit Transit	November 1992	750 sq mi (1,942 km^{2})	118,860	Northern and western Skagit County	485,563	0.4%	skagittransit.org
Spokane Transit Authority	March 10, 1981	248 sq mi (642 km^{2})	481,616	Central Spokane County	10,433,702	0.8%	spokanetransit.com
TranGO	November 5, 2013	5,034 sq mi (13,038 km^{2})	40,615	Okanogan County	62,675	0.4%	okanogantransit.com
Valley Transit	March 18, 1980	25 sq mi (65 km^{2})	54,252	Southeastern Walla Walla County	467,994	0.6%	valleytransit.com
Whatcom Transportation Authority	March 10, 1983	776 sq mi (2,010 km^{2})	240,415	Western Whatcom County	3,709,433	0.6%	ridewta.com

== See also ==
- Public transportation in Washington (state)
- Non-PTBA transit systems in Washington state:
  - Everett Transit
  - Grays Harbor Transit
  - King County Metro
  - Pullman Transit
  - Sound Transit – regional transit authority of Seattle metropolitan area
  - Yakima Transit
