= Valley Transit =

Valley Transit refers to several transit companies in the United States:

- Valley Transit (Wisconsin) in Appleton, Wisconsin
- Valley Regional Transit, in Boise, Idaho
- Valley Transportation Authority in Santa Claria County, California
- Valley Transit (Washington) in Walla Walla, Washington

== See also ==
- Valley Metro (disambiguation)
