= Clallam Transit =

Public transit operator in Washington, US

Clallam Transit System

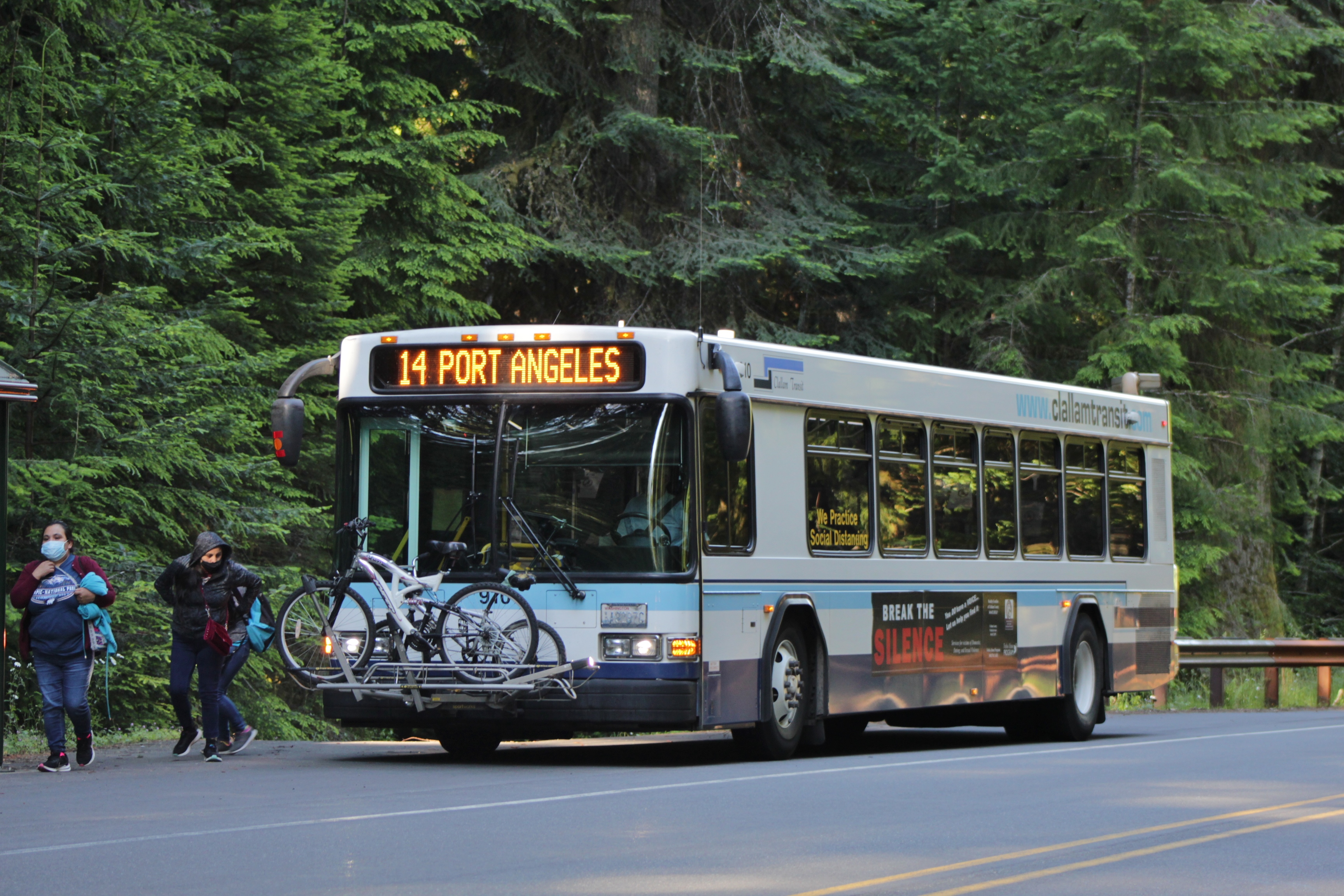
- Clallam Transit bus on route 14 near Lake Crescent
- Founded: July 24, 1979
- Headquarters: 830 W. Lauridsen Blvd. Port Angeles, Washington, U.S.
- Service type: Bus service, paratransit, dial-a-bus, vanpool
- Routes: 13
- General manager: Jim Fetzer
- Website: clallamtransit.com

Clallam Transit System is a public transit operator in Clallam County, Washington, United States. It has 12 routes and also provides paratransit and vanpool services. The agency also coordinates with other transit agencies to provide inter-county connections.

== History ==
The Clallam County Public Transportation Benefit Area (PTBA) was formed on July 24, 1979, using a 0.3 percent sales tax approved by local voters. The following year, Clallam Transit began operating bus service on ten routes across eastern Clallam County. In 1983, the western half of the county voted to be annexed into the system.

In 2011, Clallam Transit opened a new, $15.4 million transit center in downtown Port Angeles. The agency began accepting mobile tickets in 2017 through the Token Transit app.

Clallam Transit debuted its "Strait Shot" intercity bus route in June 2017, connecting Port Angeles to the Bainbridge Island ferry terminal and other points in Kitsap County. The agency launched a shuttle connecting Port Angeles to the Hurricane Ridge area of Olympic National Park in 2022; following a fire that damaged the Hurricane Ridge Day Lodge, the buses ran with limited capacity. A similar service for the Hoh Rain Forest was also under consideration, pending negotiations with Jefferson Transit and the National Park Service.

In November 2023, the Clallam Transit Board approved a one-year pilot for fare-free service on its routes, with the exception of Route 123 and the Hurricane Ridge Shuttle, for the entirety of 2024. The decision was made a year after free fares for youth riders went into effect as part of a statewide initiative and subsequently doubled ridership for under-18 passengers. A state grant of $1.9 million from the Move Ahead Washington package will fund the program.

== Routes ==
Clallam Transit has 13 fixed routes and two microtransit routes with flexible stops. The fixed-route service is provided on primarily on weekdays between 5 a.m. and 10 p.m., with less service on Saturdays and Sundays.

=== Intracounty ===
- Route 10 Joyce - Port Angeles to Joyce
- Route 14 Forks - Port Angeles to Forks
- Route 15 LaPush - Forks to LaPush
- Route 16 Clallam Bay - Forks to Neah Bay
- Route 17 Forks Shuttle - Forks loop
- Route 20 College/Plaza - Port Angeles loop, via Peninsula College
- Route 22 Lincoln/Peabody - Port Angeles loop, via Courthouse
- Route 24 Cherry Hill - Port Angeles loop, via Shane Park
- Route 26 West Side - Port Angeles loop, West side
- Route 30 Highway 101 Commuter - Port Angeles to Sequim
- Route 40 Sequim Shuttle - Sequim loop
- Route 52 Diamond Point - Sequim to Diamond Point

=== Intercounty ===
- West Jefferson Transit Connection - Forks to Aberdeen
- Jefferson Transit Connection (Route 8 Sequim) - Sequim to Port Townsend
- Route 123 "Strait Shot" - Port Angeles to Bainbridge Island

== Fares ==
Clallam Transit introduced zero-fare service on most routes on January 1, 2024. The Hurricane Ridge shuttle and Strait Shot (Route 123) inter-city service still charge fares along with some Clallam Connect dial-a-ride trips. Clallam Transit accepts fares through cash payments, the Token Transit app, or bus passes.

Prior to the zero-fare trial, regular routes charged $1 for regular passengers and $0.50 for those eligible for reduced fares; long-distance routes 14 and 30 charged $1.50 for regular passengers and $1 for reduced fares; and Route 123 charged $10 for adult passengers and $5 for reduced fares. Youth passengers, U.S. military veterans, and Peninsula College students were not charged for fares.
