= Jefferson Transit (Washington) =

Jefferson Transit Authority
- Founded: 1980
- Headquarters: 63 4 Corners Road; Port Townsend, Washington, U.S.
- Service area: Jefferson County, Washington, U.S.
- Service type: Bus service, paratransit, vanpool
- Website: jeffersontransit.com

The Jefferson Transit Authority is a public transit agency serving Jefferson County, Washington, United States. It provides fixed route buses, dial-a-ride paratransit, vanpools, and ridesharing.

== History ==
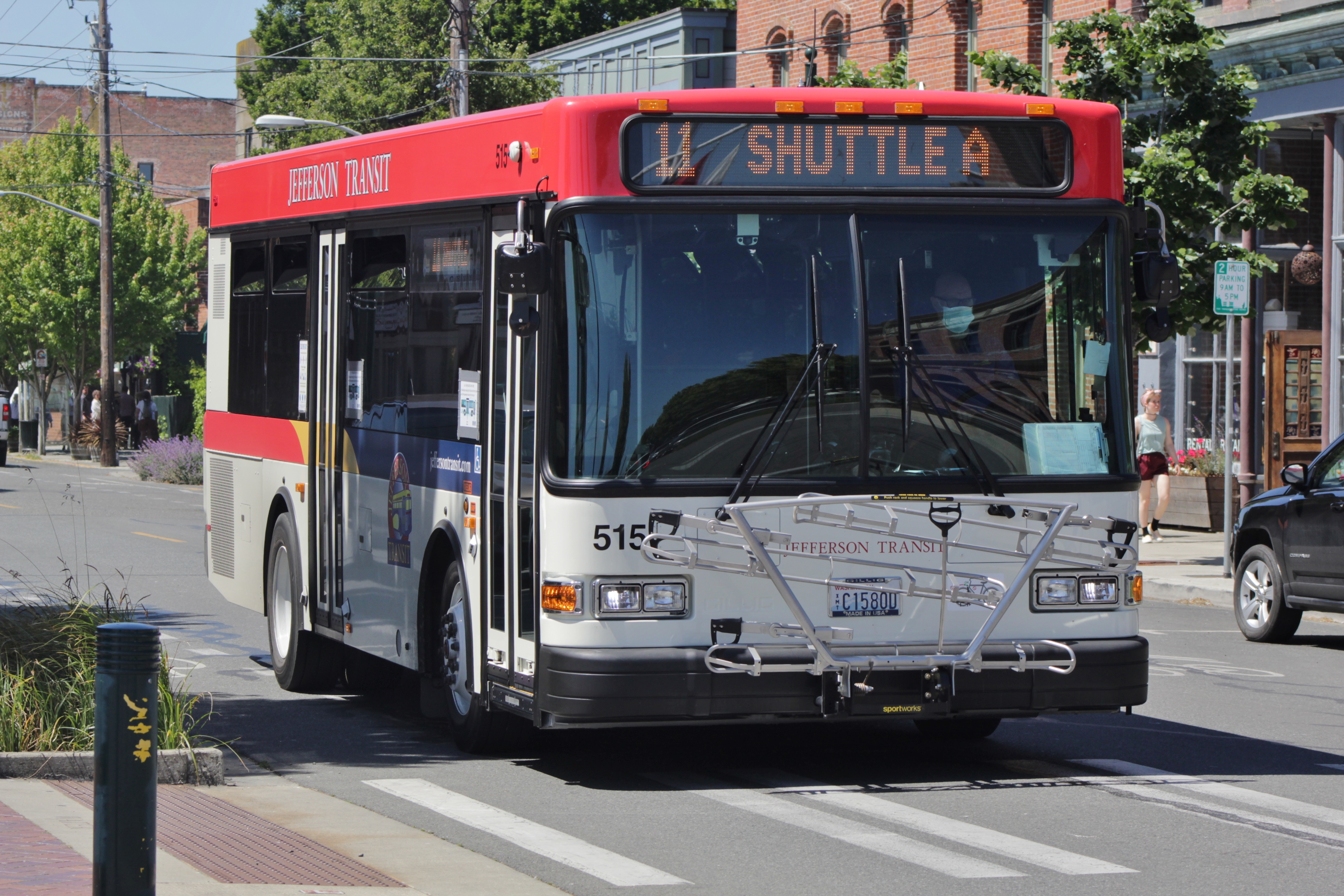
A Jefferson Transit bus in Port Townsend

Transit services around Port Townsend began in 1915 with the debut of passenger "jitney" buses operated by private companies. The Stevens Stage Line, successor to the original jitney in Port Townsend, was contracted by the Clallam-Jefferson Community Action Council in 1979 to operate a pilot transit route using funds from the Urban Mass Transportation Administration. A public transportation benefit area was approved by voters in Jefferson County on November 4, 1980, leading to the establishment of Jefferson Transit. The agency began operating routes in May 1981 and bought out the Stevens Stage Line on September 17, 1981.

Jefferson Transit expanded its operations to include connections to Forks on the west side of the Olympic Peninsula in 1995. The system was initially funded by a 0.3 percent sales tax that was increased to 0.6 percent in 2000 and 0.9 percent in 2011 following voter referendums. Following the boarding of a private bus near Port Townsend by U.S. Border Patrol agents, Jefferson Transit allowed the American Civil Liberties Union to post English and Spanish signs in buses with information on civil rights in early 2009.

In June 2015, Jefferson Transit opened their new administrative headquarters on Four Corners Road and a transit center in Port Townsend to replace their existing facilities. The headquarters also includes a public park and ride lot that was expanded in 2018 to add a bicycle parking station.

Jefferson Transit ceased collecting its fares in March 2020 due to the COVID-19 pandemic and continued to operate fare-free for most routes. It resumed fare collection with the launch of its Kingston express route in 2022. Jefferson Transit became a fully fare-free system on January 2, 2024, when it stopped collecting fares on all routes.

== Routes ==
- Route 1 Brinnon/ Quilcene/ Tri Area - Port Townsend to Brinnon
- Route 6 Tri Area Loop - Port Townsend to Tri Area
- Route 7 Poulsbo/ Port Ludlow/ Tri Area - Port Townsend to Poulsbo
- Route 8 Sequim - Port Townsend to Sequim
- Route 11 Downtown Shuttle - Port Townsend Downtown Loop
- Route 12 Fort Worden - Port Townsend Loop via Fort Worden
- Route 13 Castle Hill - Port Townsend Loop via Castle Hill
- Route 14 North Beach - West Port Townsend Loop
- West Jefferson Olympic Connection - Forks to Amanda Park (Lake Quinault)

== Buses ==
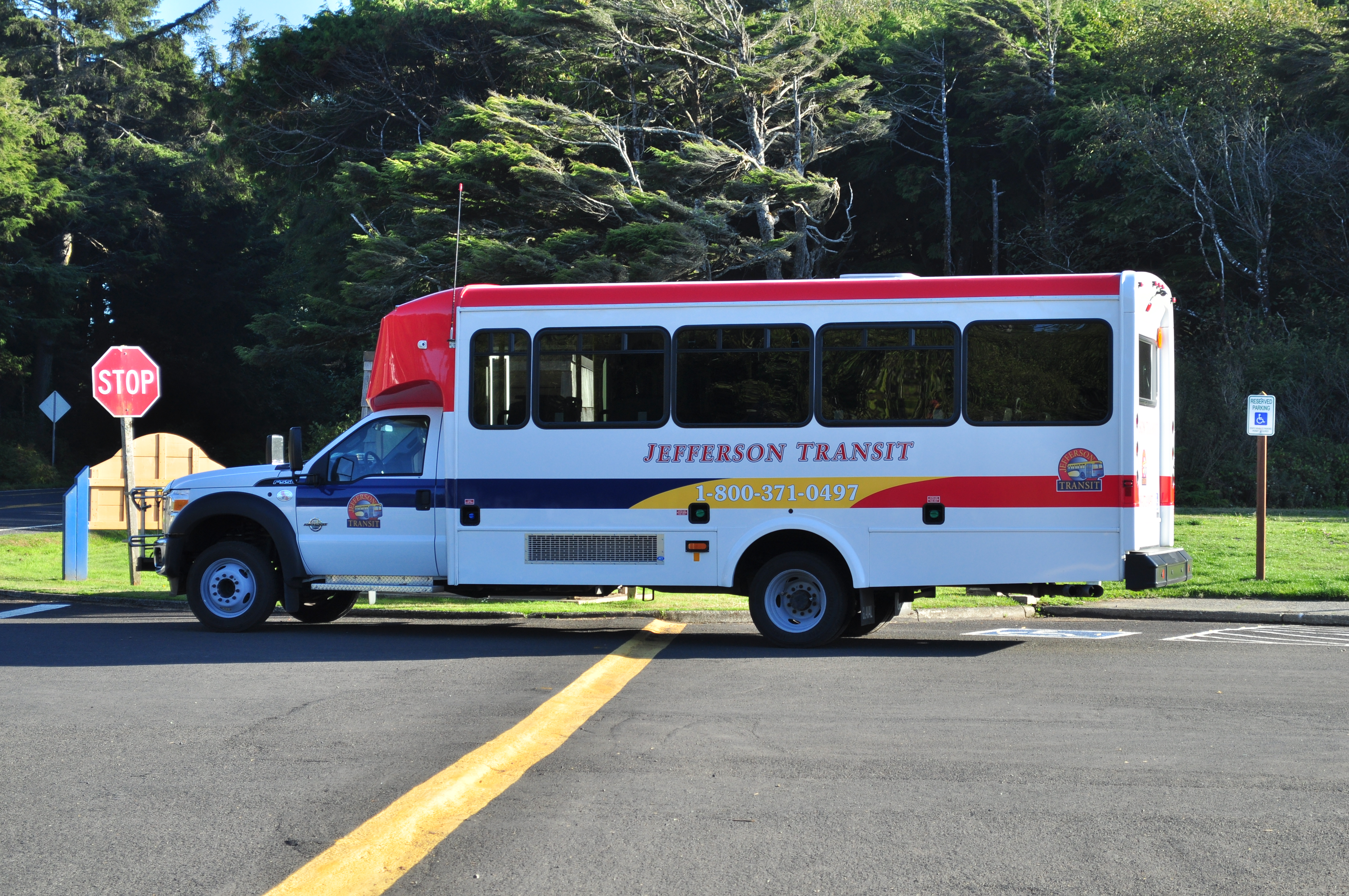
Jefferson Transit bus at Kalaloch Lodge in Olympic National Park

Jefferson Transit operates eight fixed route buses within Jefferson County. It also operates, in conjunction with Clallam Transit and Grays Harbor Transit, an Olympic Connection service, which goes from Forks to Grays Harbor.
