= Lewis County Transit =

Local transit system in Lewis County, Washington, U.S.

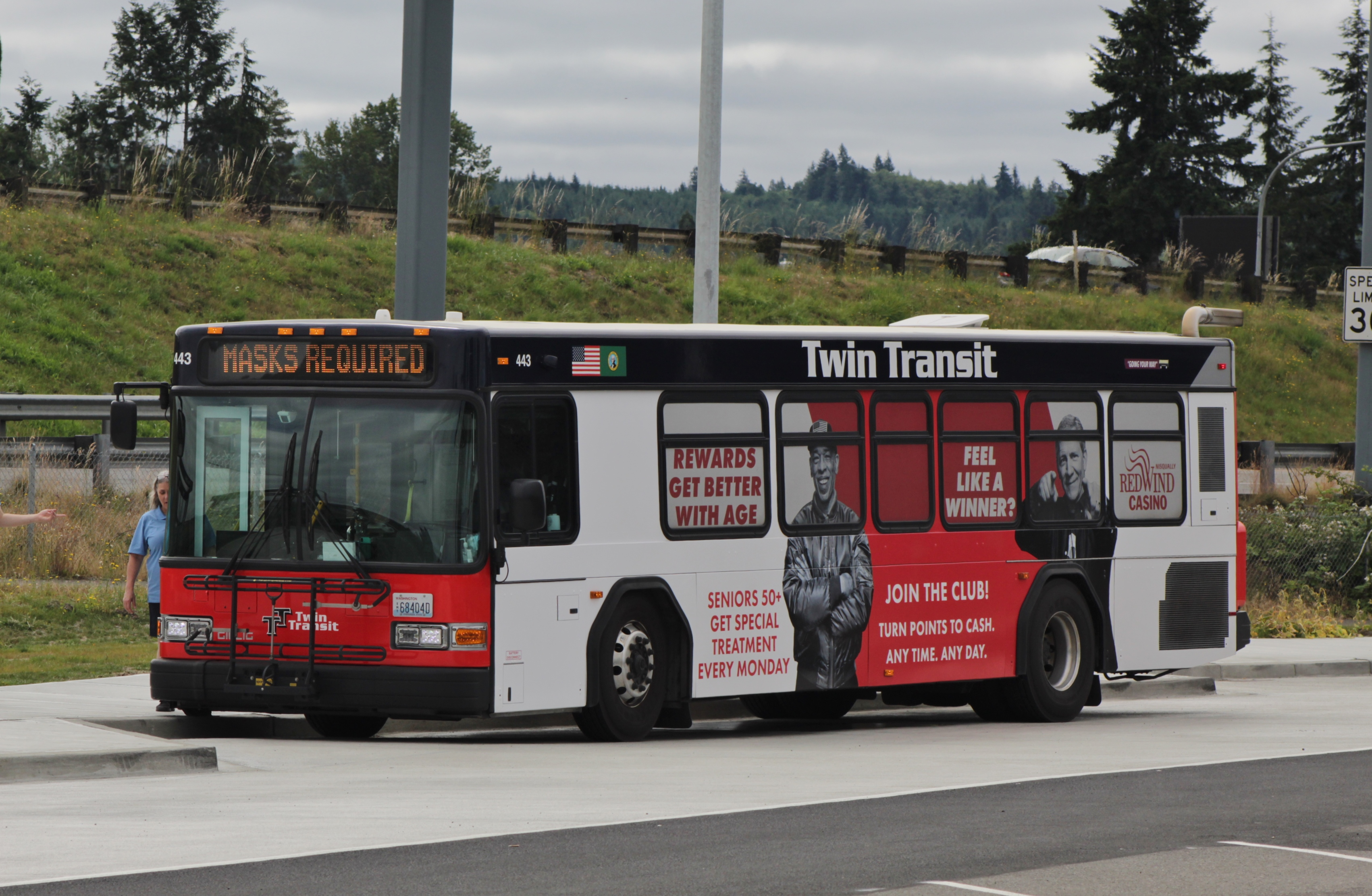
- A Twin Transit bus at the Mellen Street e-Transit Station in Centralia
- Founded: 1976 (as Twin Transit)
- Headquarters: 212 E. Locust Street, Centralia, Washington
- Locale: Lewis County, Washington
- Service area: Centralia, Chehalis
- Service type: bus service, paratransit, Demand responsive transport
- Routes: 7
- Hubs: 4
- Executive Director: Robert "Josh" Nylander
- Website: lewiscountytransit.org

Lewis County Transit, formerly Twin Transit, is a public transit system serving the cities of Centralia and Chehalis in Lewis County, Washington. It operates four local transit bus routes and two cross-county bus routes, along with options for Dial-A-Ride and paratransit.

The agency was founded in 1976 and began operating on November 1, 1977. It was named Twin Transit until rebranding to Lewis County Transit in 2024.

== History ==
Public transportation service in Lewis County was originally operated by private companies under city-granted franchises. The operating franchise for Centralia and Chehalis was held by the Tri-City Transit Company of Aberdeen until 1953, when it was acquired by the Twin City Transit Company. The company operated an hourly bus between Centralia and Chehalis, but had financial difficulties and proposed ceasing operations several times in the 1950s and 1960s. In January 1972, the Twin Transit Company planned to shut down but was ordered by the Washington Utilities and Transportation Commission to continue for 30-days per its franchise agreement while the local government searched for an alternative. The company debuted a short-lived dial-a-ride service in April 1972 to save costs, but it was shut down three months later due to operating losses.

A citizens group was formed in 1972 to advocate for a permanent public transit system in Lewis County, while a charity service provided free buses in lieu of the Twin City Transit Company. The Centralia city government established its own single-route bus service in December 1973, using two used coaches purchased from the Bellingham Transit Company, but it attracted few riders. The city government had also planned to recoup some operating costs by selling advertisements, but found few businesses willing to pay. A household utility tax of under $1 per month was proposed to fund an expanded public transit system and an advisory vote was placed on the November 1975 ballot in Chehalis and Centralia. The non-binding endorsement of a household utility tax passed by 51.4 percent in Chehalis and 53.6 percent in Centralia.

The Lewis County government organized a public transportation benefit area and held several meetings to determine its boundaries, which initially included the Twin Cities and surrounding unincorporated areas. A binding measure to establish a household utility tax was placed on the November 2, 1976, ballot and was passed by 53.5 percent of voters. The Lewis Public Transportation Benefit Area Authority, branded as Twin Transit, was created by the ballot measure and began collecting household utility taxes ahead of a launch scheduled for 1977. Twin Transit began operating on November 1, 1977, with two routes and used coaches acquired from the Centralia bus system. In its first month of free service, the system carried 9,000 passengers but suffered from maintenance issues that affected its older coaches. The household tax was replaced by a 0.1 percent sales tax in 1985.

In the early 2000s, Twin Transit collaborated with several local transit agencies to operate experimental inter-city services to Longview (connecting onward to Vancouver) and Olympia with funding from the Lower Columbia Community Action Council. The agency consolidated several routes and eliminated most weekend service in 2013, but debuted a commuter route to Olympia.

In 2023, the transit organization reported a 35% increase over the prior year, with over 720,000 miles driven, more than 26,000 stops, and 13,000 routes taken for free by students. Later in the year, the county was announced as part of the Pacific Northwest Hydrogen Hub (PNW H2) initiative through the U.S. Department of Energy; Lewis County Transit became the first transit agency in the county to receive a grant from the program.

Twin Transit was renamed to Lewis County Transit on January 1, 2024, to reflect recent changes to services and infrastructure. The same year, Lewis County Transit, via the PNW H2, partnered with the Centralia School District on a pilot plan, known as the Renewable Energy Vehicle and Infrastructure Technician (REVIT) training program, to encourage local students to enter in the educational and professional fields associated with green energy. With grants from the Washington State Department of Ecology, the program is planned to expand into other school districts in the county and eventually throughout the state.

== Routes ==
Lewis County Transit offers five local and county fixed-route lines and two inter-county commuter services. The routes are color coded to match local school colors.

The agency previously operated the Capital Commuter, a route to the Washington State Capitol in Olympia, that debuted in November 2013, but the route was eliminated in September 2014 as part of a service reduction that also included all Sunday service. A replacement route, the Green Line, began in 2021, operating directly from the Mellen Street e-Transit Station in Centralia to the Tumwater Transit Hub, with onward connections to Intercity Transit. Additionally in 2021, the linked transit programs began to offer connecting options to Seattle–Tacoma International Airport. In August 2022, Twin Transit introduced a fixed-route line to Castle Rock. In March 2023, direct routes to Morton and Kelso were created. The Kelso line ended a joint partnership with RiverCities Transit.

Lewis County Transit coordinates with a Thurston County commuter program, Rural Transit, that allows riders in more rural areas of Lewis County to have access to the intercounty bus system. As of 2022, Rural Transit links with Lewis County Transit at Centralia's Amtrak station; there are future plans to connect the program at the Mellen Street Station. The free-to-ride service is weekday only.

=== Other services ===
The local Dial-A-Ride service, named DARTT, works in conjunction with Lewis County Transit's fixed routes and provides riders a weekday service beyond Chehalis and Centralia, including most of western Lewis County and Olympia. The program expanded in 2021 to include travel to eastern destinations in the county. DARTT is funded directly through Twin Transit and fees, and received additional financing in 2021 from a grant by the National Center for Mobility Management and Community Transportation Association of America. As of a 2021 report, disabled people accounted for approximately 27% of its ridership.

The paratransit system, named LIFTT, is used for any rider medically unable to use the fixed route system.

== Stations and facilities ==
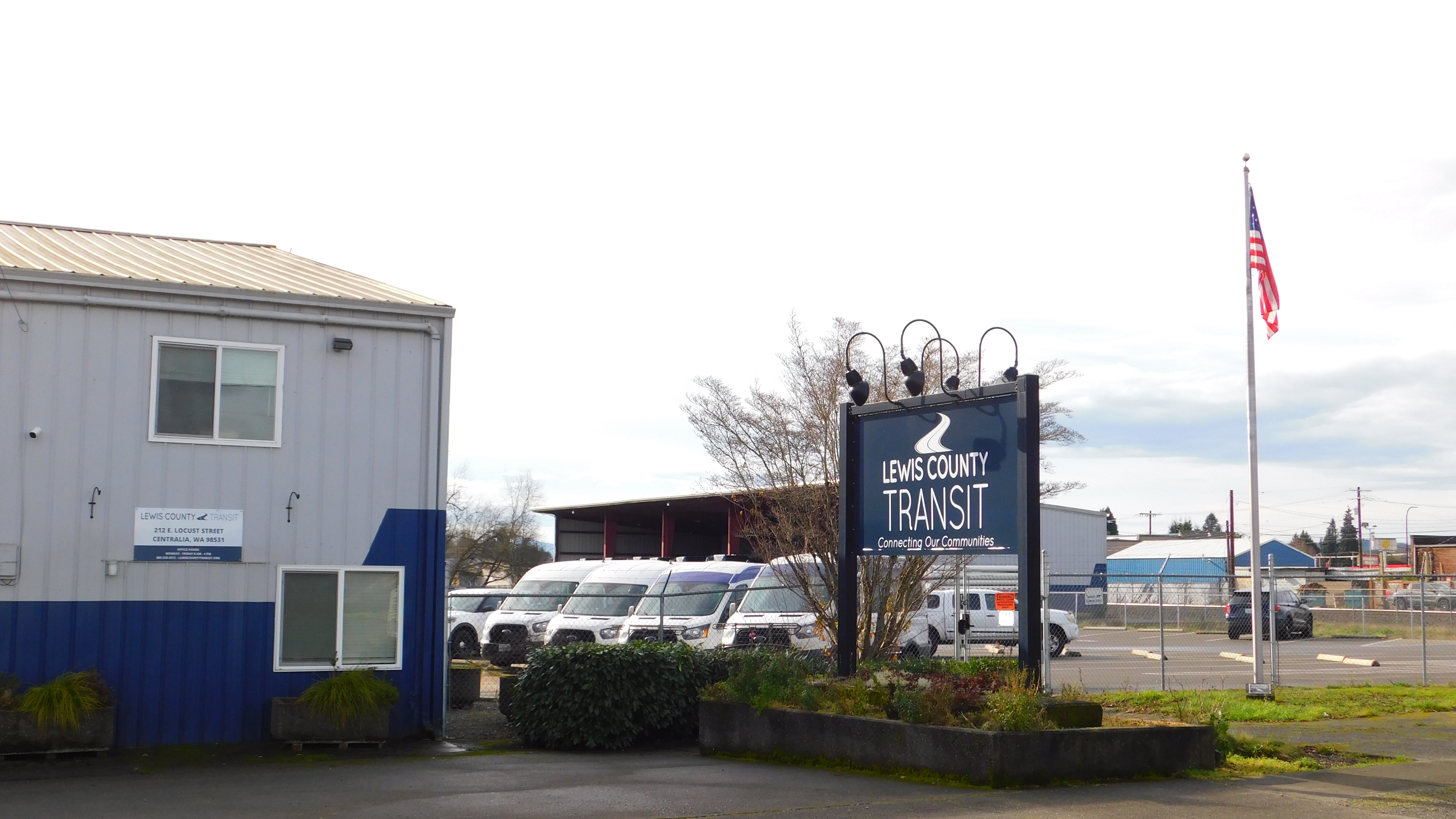
Lewis County Transit, main office, 2026

The central hub for Lewis County Transit is the Mellen Street e-Transit Station located next to I-5 in Centralia. The station covers 2.5 acres (1.0 ha) and hosts an induction charging station for the electric bus fleet, and includes EV charging stations for passenger vehicles. The area is also used for carpool parking. The Mellen Street station was built based on a 2020 fund of $3.4 million from a combination of a Green Transportation Grant from the Washington State Department of Transportation (WSDOT), the Diesel Emissions Reduction Act, and a settlement from the Volkswagen emissions scandal. A grant of $37,000 from the TransAlta Coal Transition Board in 2017 helped to fund the transit system's first electric bus charging station.

Additional hubs are planned within Chehalis near the Port of Chehalis and at an existing park-and-ride lot adjacent to the State Route 6 interchange.

Lewis County Transit planned to open the first hydrogen fueling station in Washington on Port of Chehalis property. Originally scheduled to open in 2023 and rescheduled to late 2025, the opening of the Port of Chehalis Hydrogen Production & Fueling Station was again shifted into spring 2026. A groundbreaking ceremony for the $9.7 million project was held in August 2025.

== Fleet ==
The first fleet of buses used by Twin Transit consisted of two coaches from the Centralia bus system. In 2020, Twin Transit announced plans to purchase its first battery electric buses with an order for two converted Gillig Phantom coaches; the electric buses debuted in 2021.

The agency planned to purchase two hydrogen fuel cell buses following the completion of the first hydrogen refueling station in the state, funded by grants awarded to the Chehalis city government. The first bus, recognized as the first of its type in the Pacific Northwest, was delivered in March 2024. Two additional hydrogen-fueled busses are scheduled to be in operation later in the year, with a total of 5 in service planned by the end of 2025. As of 2024, the vehicles cost approximately $1.2 million and are expected to remain in service for a minimum of 12 years.

Lewis County Transit has five carpool vans, primarily used for the DARTT program.

== Fares ==
Beginning in October 2022, passengers under 19 years old are not charged a fare. The statewide elimination of youth transit fares was funded by the Move Ahead Washington package that was passed by the state legislature meant. Lewis County Transit requires all passengers under the age of 10 to be escorted by an older family member.
