= Dosewallips River =

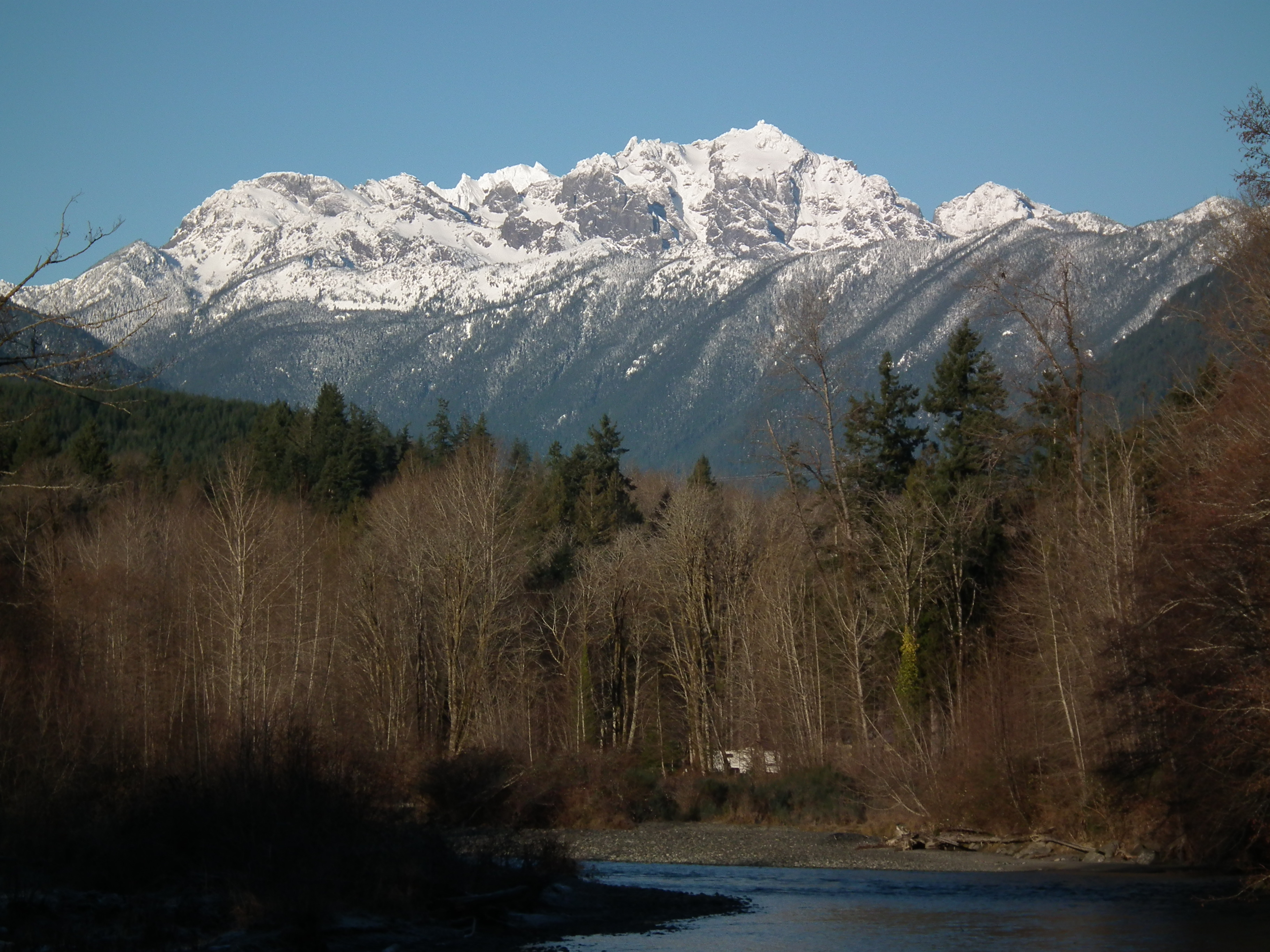
- Mount Constance (7,756 ft) above the Dosewallips River in Dosewallips State Park

- Location of the mouth of the Dosewallips River in Washington

Location
- Country: United States
- State: Washington
- County: Jefferson

Physical characteristics
- Source: Olympic Mountains
  - coordinates: 47°47′1″N 123°20′18″W
- Mouth: Hood Canal
  - coordinates: 47°41′6″N 122°53′47″W

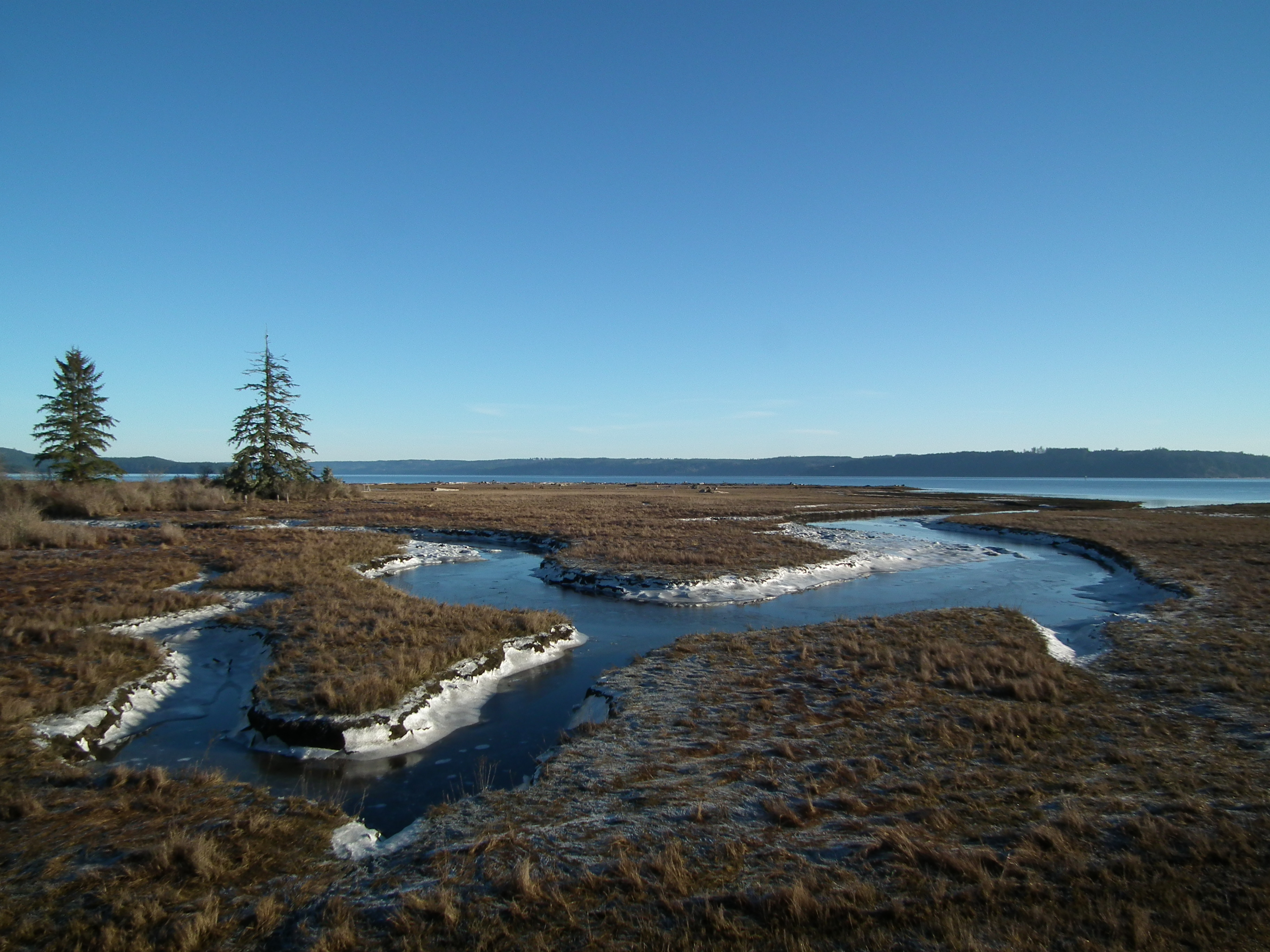
Tidal shoreline near the estuary of the Dosewallips River, Dosewallips State Park

The Dosewallips River (/ˌdoʊsɪˈwɔːlɪps/ DOH-si-WAW-lips) is a river situated on the Olympic Peninsula in the U.S. state of Washington. It rises near Mount Anderson in the Olympic Mountains within Olympic National Park and drains to Hood Canal and thence to the Pacific Ocean.

The river originates in two forks, which join about five miles from the headwaters. The National Park Service maintains trails and campsites along both forks, including one at the fork itself. The road leading to the trailhead was washed out in January 2002, and the ranger station near the trailhead has been abandoned.

The entire estuary of the Dosewallips is within Dosewallips State Park and ongoing restoration efforts led by Wild Fish Conservancy, the Port Gamble S'Klallam Tribe, and the Hood Canal Coordinating Council are intended to improve salmon habitat through the reconnection of the river to its historical floodplain.

== Name ==
The name Dosewallips comes from a Twana Indian myth about a man named Dos-wail-opsh who was turned into a mountain at the river's source. There are also several Klallam legends about the "Great Changer", Doquebatl, who transformed a mythical Klallam chief into a mountain at the headwaters of the Dosewallips River. In another story Doquebatl changed a woman into Mount Rainier and her son into Little Tahoma.

== History ==
In 1923, the Washington State Department of Highways built a steel truss bridge over the river near its mouth in Brinnon to carry U.S. Route 101.

In 1982, the Jefferson County Public Utility District proposed the construction of a 10.4-megawatt hydroelectric dam on the river near the Elkhorn Campground. Controversy over the dam project led to a dispute between the PUD and the Washington Department of Ecology that was settled in the United States Supreme Court case PUD No. 1 of Jefferson County v. Washington Department of Ecology in 1994.

== See also ==
- List of rivers of Washington (state)
- PUD No. 1 of Jefferson County v. Washington Department of Ecology
