= PUD No. 1 of Jefferson County v. Washington Department of Ecology =

- Supreme Court of the United States

Argued February 23, 1994 Decided May 31, 1994
- Full case name: PUD No. 1 of Jefferson County v. Washington Department of Ecology
- Docket no.: 92-1911
- Citations: 511 U.S. 700 (more) 114 S. Ct. 1900; 128 L. Ed. 2d 716

Holding
- Washington's minimum stream flow requirement is a permissible condition of a §401 certification. The State may impose requirements to ensure that activities which may result in a discharge into the navigable waters will comply with state water quality standards. Affirmed 121 Wash. 2d 179, 849 P. 2d 646.

Court membership
- Chief Justice William Rehnquist Associate Justices Harry Blackmun · John P. Stevens; Sandra Day O'Connor · Antonin Scalia; Anthony Kennedy · David Souter; Clarence Thomas · Ruth Bader Ginsburg

Case opinions
- Majority: O'Connor, joined by Rehnquist, Blackmun, Stevens, Kennedy, Souter, Ginsburg
- Concurrence: Stevens
- Dissent: Thomas, joined by Scalia

PUD No. 1 of Jefferson County v. Washington Department of Ecology, 511 U.S. 700 (1994), is a case decided by the United States Supreme Court that interpreted section 401 of the Clean Water Act. The case involved an application by the Jefferson County Public Utility District and Tacoma City Light in northwestern Washington to build a hydropower facility on the Dosewallips River, first proposed in 1982 and known as the "Elkhorn Dam" project. The Washington State Department of Ecology issued a certification to the project in 1986 that imposed minimum water flow requirements to protect species of salmon and steelhead under the federal Clean Water Act. Tacoma City Light argued that the dam project would only need to adhere to minimum flow standards set by the Federal Energy Regulatory Commission (FERC), who license dams. Environmentalist groups argued that the FERC was insensitive to recreation and protection of salmon and steelhead and asked the state to enforce its minimum flow standards.

The Washington State Supreme Court ruled in favor of the state Department of Ecology on April 1, 1993. The case was taken to the United States Supreme Court the following year, where the court ruled 7–2 in favor of the state.

== Background ==
In 1982, the Jefferson County Public Utility District (also known as PUD No. 1), in conjunction with Tacoma City Light, proposed the construction of a 10.4-megawatt hydroelectric dam on the Dosewallips River, near the Elkhorn Campground. The Dosewallips River, a glacier-fed stream that originates in the Olympic Mountains and empties into Hood Canal, passes through Olympic National Park and Olympic National Forest. The river, described as being in "pristine condition", supports populations of salmon, steelhead and trout native to the area. The Jefferson County PUD had looked to damming the Dosewallips River to provide hydroelectricity as well as drinking water to support long-term population growth.

Tacoma and Jefferson applied for a water quality certificate from the State of Washington in 1983 as part of requirements outlined by section 401 of the federal Clean Water Act; the certificate came in addition to a license from the Federal Energy Regulatory Commission (FERC) before beginning construction. After a two-year environmental study by Tacoma, Jefferson PUD and the state departments of Ecology, Fisheries and Wildlife, and the federal Fish and Wildlife Service, the dam was proposed to maintain minimum in-stream flows of 65 to 155 cubic feet (1.8 to 4.4 m^{3}) per second, depending on the month. The Washington State Department of Ecology issued the section 401 certificate in 1986, with a condition to maintain minimum in-stream flows of 100 to 200 cubic feet (2.8 to 5.7 m^{3}) per second.

Tacoma and Jefferson appealed the in-stream flows requirement to the Washington Pollution Control Hearings Board (PCHB), who initially ruled in 1987 that the Department of Ecology had acted within its authority in placing the requirements in order to preserve the fisheries of the Dosewallips River. At a second hearing, the PCHB considered an argument from Tacoma and Jefferson alleging that the Department of Ecology had exceeded its authority in imposing the in-stream flows requirement to enhance the fishery, rather than maintain and preserve it. As a result, the flow rates were reversed by the board, leading to a cross-appeal in the Thurston County Superior Court. The court ruled in 1991 that the Department of Ecology had the authority to require an enhancement of the Dosewallips fisheries and re-instated their proposed flow rates.

The case was heard by the Washington Supreme Court in 1993. The court ruled in favor of the Department of Ecology, finding that the department intended to preserve, not enhance, the Dosewallips fisheries and that the PCHB's findings were erroneous. The court also concluded that the Department of Ecology's permit was valid and was not preempted by the Federal Power Act and the FERC license.

== Opinion of the Court ==
Justice O'Connor authored the opinion of the Court.

== Subsequent developments ==
Tacoma City Light withdrew its application for the project in April 1995 and announced the following month that it would abandon plans to build the dam.
