= Brinnon, Washington =

- Census-designated place
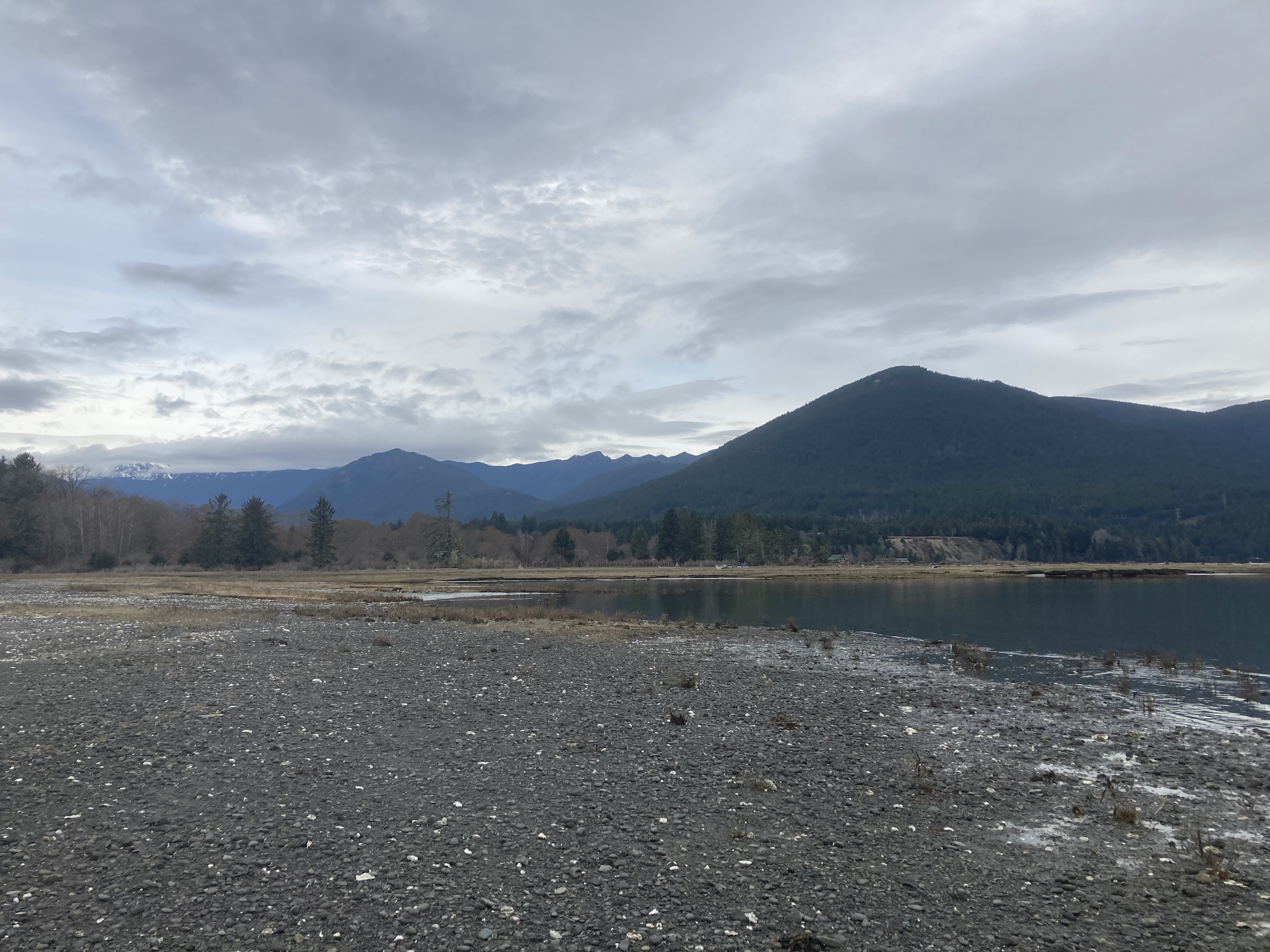
- Brinnon as seen from the shore of the Hood Canal with the Olympic Mountains in the background

- Location of Brinnon, Washington
- Coordinates: 47°40′09″N 122°55′30″W
- Country: United States
- State: Washington
- County: Jefferson
- Established: 1891

Area
  - Total: 9.86 sq mi (25.54 km^{2})
  - Land: 9.61 sq mi (24.89 km^{2})
  - Water: 0.25 sq mi (0.66 km^{2})
- Elevation c: 722 ft (220 m)

Population (2020)
  - Total: 907
  - Density: 94.4/sq mi (36.4/km^{2})
- Time zone: UTC-8 (Pacific (PST))
  - Summer (DST): UTC-7 (PDT)
- ZIP Code: 98320
- Area code(s): 360, 564
- FIPS code: 53-08080
- GNIS feature ID: 2407906

Brinnon is a census-designated place (CDP) in Jefferson County, Washington, United States. The population was 907 at the 2020 census. The community is named for Ewell P. Brinnon, who in the late 1850s took a donation land claim at the mouth of the Duckabush River. Its known landmarks include Dosewallips State Park, Triton Cove State Park, Murhutt Falls, and Black Point Marina. Brinnon is also adjacent to Camp Parsons, the oldest Boy Scout camp west of the Mississippi River.

== History ==
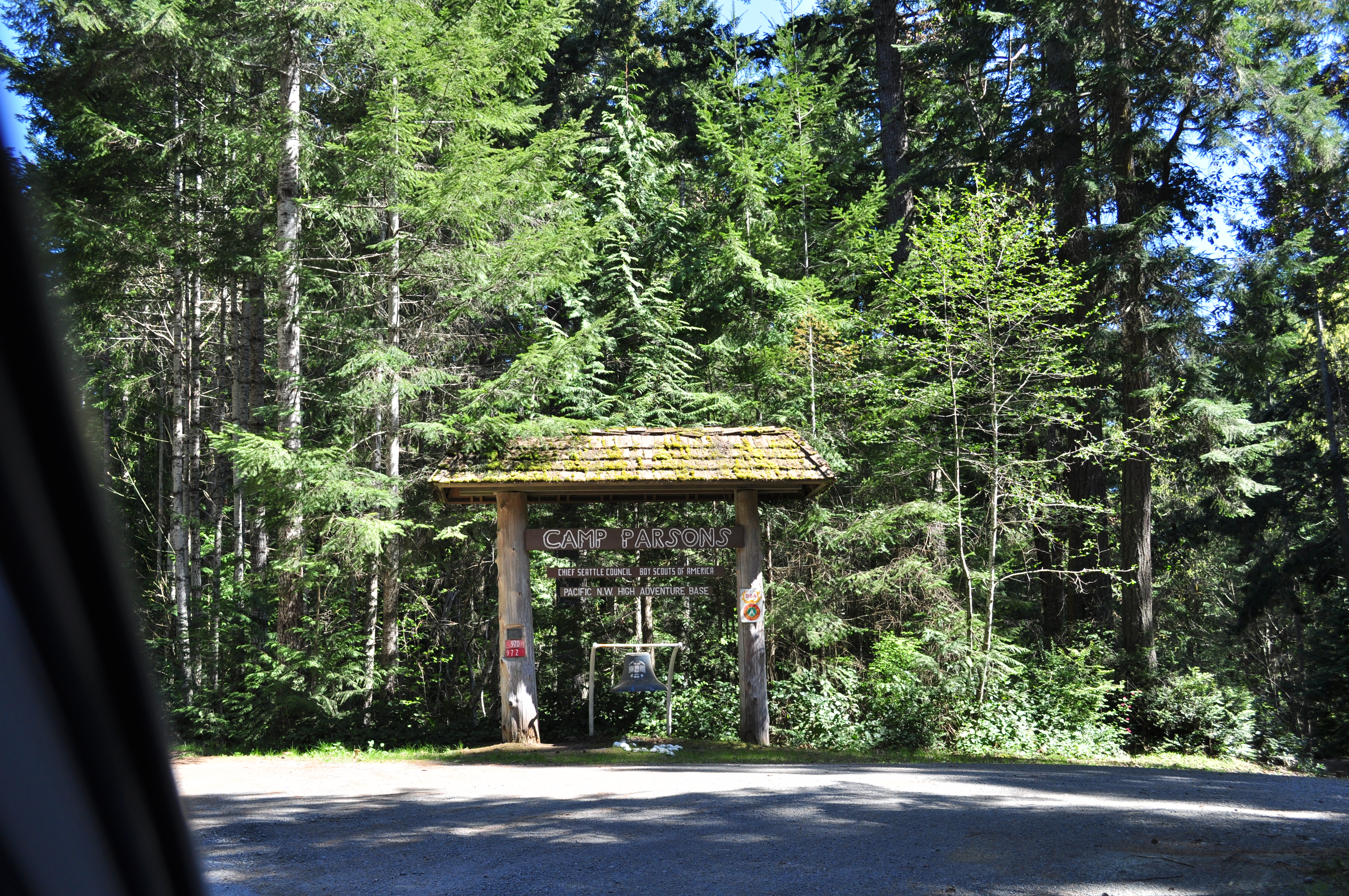
BSA Camp Parsons

White settlers began arriving in the area that would become Brinnon, then referred to as both Quogaboos and Ducaboos, in the 1850s. Ewell P. Brinnon, a settler who later became the namesake of the settlement, took a donation land claim in the late 1850s at the mouth of the Duckabush River. In 1891 Brinnon was established when the post office began operations in the settlement.

Camp Parsons was founded in 1919 just outside the north end of Brinnon. The camp is the oldest Boy Scout camp west of the Mississippi River.

== Geography ==
Brinnon is located approximately 61 miles (98 km) north of Olympia, on the Olympic Peninsula's east side. It sits on the west side of Hood Canal on the eastern edge of the Olympic National Forest.

According to the United States Census Bureau, the CDP has a total area of 9.8 square miles (25.5 km^{2}), of which 9.6 square miles (24.9 km^{2}) are land and 0.3 square miles (0.7 km^{2}), or 2.57%, are water. The CDP extends from Wawa Point in the north, just south of Jackson Cove, to the Mason County line in the south at Triton Cove, and includes the unincorporated communities (from north to south) of Seal Rock, Brinnon, and Duckabush. The Dosewallips River crosses the north-central part of the CDP and enters Hood Canal at Brinnon Flats just north of the settlement of Brinnon, while the Duckabush River crosses the south-central part of the CDP, entering Hood Canal at Duckabush village, just south of Black Point.

=== Climate ===
Brinnon experiences an oceanic climate (Köppen climate classification Cfb) and is almost categorised as part of the Csb climate category, receiving slightly more than 30 mm (1.2 in), the threshold for Cfb inclusion.

Climate data for Brinnon
Month	Jan	Feb	Mar	Apr	May	Jun	Jul	Aug	Sep	Oct	Nov	Dec	Year
Mean daily maximum °F (°C)	45 (7)	50 (10)	56 (13)	61 (16)	67 (19)	72 (22)	77 (25)	79 (26)	73 (23)	62 (17)	51 (11)	44 (7)	61 (16)
Mean daily minimum °F (°C)	31 (−1)	33 (1)	35 (2)	38 (3)	43 (6)	48 (9)	51 (11)	50 (10)	46 (8)	40 (4)	35 (2)	31 (−1)	40 (4)
Average precipitation inches (mm)	7.39 (188)	7.38 (187)	5.93 (151)	3.81 (97)	2.82 (72)	2.13 (54)	1.29 (33)	1.24 (31)	1.60 (41)	4.13 (105)	7.99 (203)	8.65 (220)	54.36 (1,381)

== Demographics ==
Historical population
Census	Pop.	Note	%±
2000	803		—
2010	797		−0.7%
2020	907		13.8%
U.S. Decennial Census; 1990 2000 2010 2020

Brinnon first appeared as a census designated place in the 2000 U.S. census.

=== Racial and ethnic composition ===
Brinnon CDP, Washington – Racial and ethnic composition Note: the US Census treats Hispanic/Latino as an ethnic category. This table excludes Latinos from the racial categories and assigns them to a separate category. Hispanics/Latinos may be of any race.
Race / Ethnicity (NH = Non-Hispanic)	Pop 2000	Pop 2010	Pop 2020	% 2000	% 2010	% 2020
White alone (NH)	737	733	793	91.78%	91.97%	87.43%
Black or African American alone (NH)	2	1	0	0.25%	0.13%	0.00%
Native American or Alaska Native alone (NH)	11	5	17	1.37%	0.63%	1.87%
Asian alone (NH)	5	11	11	0.62%	1.38%	1.21%
Native Hawaiian or Pacific Islander alone (NH)	2	0	1	0.25%	0.00%	0.11%
Other race alone (NH)	5	0	4	0.62%	0.00%	0.44%
Mixed race or Multiracial (NH)	25	30	54	3.11%	3.76%	5.95%
Hispanic or Latino (any race)	16	17	27	1.99%	2.13%	2.98%
Total	803	797	907	100.00%	100.00%	100.00%

=== 2000 census ===
As of the census of 2000, there were 803 people, 413 households, and 258 families residing in the CDP. The population density was 81.3 people per square mile (31.4/km^{2}). There were 912 housing units at an average density of 92.4/sq mi (35.7/km^{2}). The racial makeup of the CDP was 92.65% White, 0.25% African American, 1.49% Native American, 0.62% Asian, 0.25% Pacific Islander, 1.00% from other races, and 3.74% from two or more races. Hispanic or Latino of any race were 1.99% of the population.

There were 413 households, out of which 10.7% had children under the age of 18 living with them, 55.2% were married couples living together, 5.1% had a female householder with no husband present, and 37.5% were non-families. 32.0% of all households were made up of individuals, and 14.5% had someone living alone who was 65 years of age or older. The average household size was 1.94 and the average family size was 2.36.

In the CDP, the population was spread out, with 10.7% under the age of 18, 3.1% from 18 to 24, 15.6% from 25 to 44, 34.9% from 45 to 64, and 35.7% who were 65 years of age or older. The median age was 58 years. For every 100 females, there were 110.2 males. For every 100 females age 18 and over, there were 110.9 males.

The median income for a household in the CDP was $27,885, and the median income for a family was $34,375. Males had a median income of $31,250 versus $16,500 for females. The per capita income for the CDP was $19,820. About 9.9% of families and 13.8% of the population were below the poverty line, including 23.3% of those under age 18 and 6.7% of those age 65 or over.

== Economy ==
Brinnon's economy has been focused on forestry from the time white settlers began living in the area. The CDP's location along the Hood Canal has also provided the area with seafood resources, namely clams, oysters, and mussels.

Except for slowdowns during the Great Depression and during an oversupply of timber in the mid-1950s the timber industry grew along with the need for commercial services. The area's productivity was supported by the Puget Sound mosquito fleet that served the area by bringing in mail, supplies, and job seekers. The boats also brought visitors and as a result, the tourist industry began to grow. As the tourist industry grew, so did the number of lodging establishments. The Olympic Inn operated for much of the 20th century as a destination resort near Seal Rock, but ultimately closed in the early 1970s. Brinnon's tourist industry reached its peak in the area during the 1950s and 1960s, but thanks to its proximity to Olympic National Park and its state parks, the settlement continues to receive campers and tourists.

== Infrastructure ==
=== Transportation ===
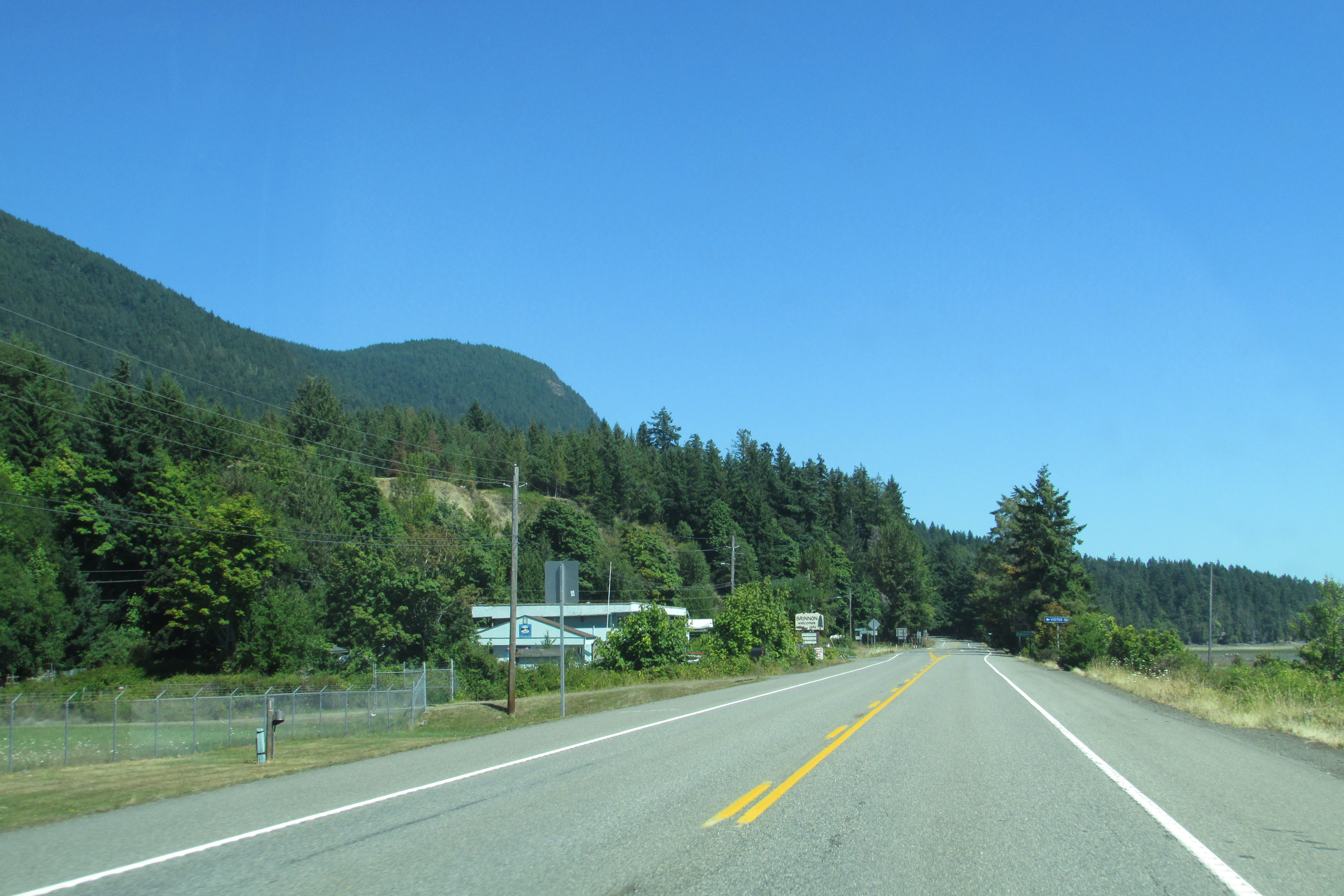
U.S. 101 through Brinnon, Washington

U.S. Route 101 runs the length of Brinnon, leading south to Olympia and north to Port Angeles. What would become known as Brinnon had been connected by rudimentary roads to Quilcene to the north as early as 1894. It was not until the mid-1920s that the settlement would be easily accessible by road with the completion of bridges over the Dosewallips and Duckabush Rivers along what would become U.S. Route 101. U.S. Route 101 is the only public road leading in or out of Brinnon. This can isolate the community's residents if the road is washed out or blocked by a landslide, an occurrence that is not uncommon.

Route 1 of Jefferson Transit provides public transit to Brinnon with four weekday round-trip bus services and two Saturday round-trip services from Port Townsend. Jefferson County Route 1 terminates at Triton Cove State Park where it provides access to Route 8 of Mason Transit Authority's bus network with two daily services from Monday to Saturday to Shelton where riders can transfer to other Mason Transit routes including access to Olympia and Bremerton.

During the late 19th and 20th centuries Brinnon was served sporadically by ferry, connecting it to other Hood Canal communities and Seattle. A ferry between Brinnon and Seabeck on the Kitsap Peninsula was established in 1921, but has since ceased operation making travel by road the primary way to access the community. The ferry route last appeared on Washington State Department of Highways maps in 1949, though some sources suggest that ferry ended operations earlier in 1941. The Hood Canal Bridge now serves to connect the communities of eastern Jefferson County to Kitsap County and points east. Brinnon's Pleasant Harbor is served by Kenmore Air with seaplane charter flights.
