= Dosewallips State Park =

State park in Jefferson County, Washington, US

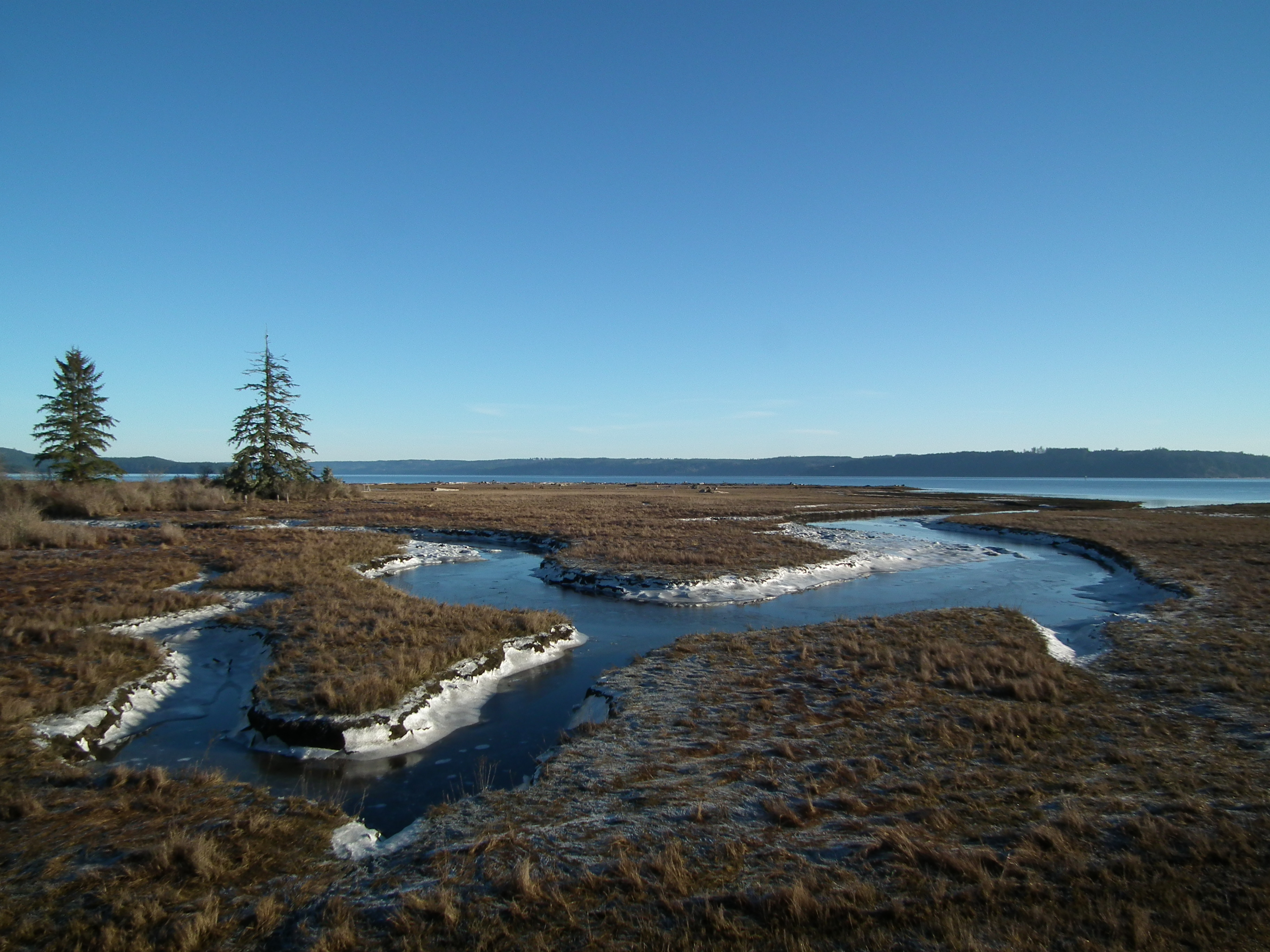
- Salt marsh shoreline

- Location within Washington (state) Location within the United States
- Location: Jefferson County, Washington, United States
- Coordinates: 47°41′06″N 122°53′47″W
- Area: 1,064 acres (431 ha)
- Elevation: 0 ft (0 m)
- Established: 1954
- Administrator: Washington State Parks and Recreation Commission
- Website: Official website

Dosewallips State Park is a public recreation area located where the Dosewallips River empties into Hood Canal in Jefferson County, Washington. The state park's 1,064 acres (431 ha) include both freshwater and saltwater shorelines. The park offers opportunities for picnicking, camping, hiking, boating, fishing, swimming, scuba diving, and shellfish harvesting.

== History ==
The park was acquired in four separate purchases between 1954 and 1972. The park's flats were the site of several old homesteads in an area known as Dose Meadows. The railroad beds found in the park's far southeast side are leftover from the days when timber was hauled by rail from the mountains to be deposited in the water and floated off to ships and mills.

== Nature ==
Four species of wild salmon and steelhead use the Dosewallips River for spawning, and the park provides wintering grounds for a herd of elk. The beach is described as "excellent" for the presence of Manila littleneck clams, native littleneck clams, and oysters. Butter clams, cockles, horse clams and geoducks can also be found.

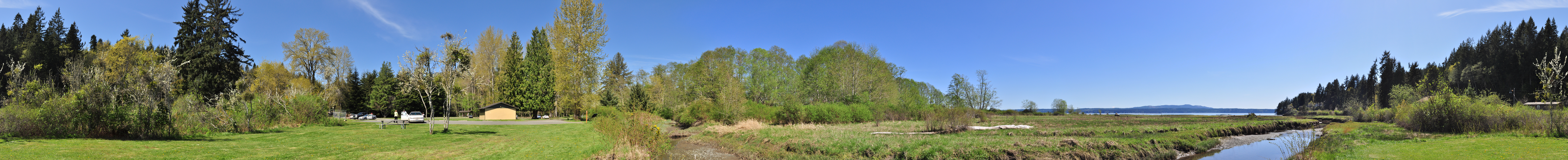
360° panoramic view of a picnic area in Dosewallips State Park, along Hood Canal, Brinnon, Washington, April 2014.
