= Swvl =

Ridesharing company based in Dubai

Swvl Holdings
- Type: Public
- Traded as: Nasdaq: SWVL
- Industry: Transportation; Mobility as a service
- Founded: 2017; 9 years ago in Cairo, Egypt
- Founder: Mostafa Kandil
- Headquarters: Dubai, UAE
- Area served: Egypt; Europe; Jordan; Kenya; Latin America; Saudi Arabia; UAE; Mexico
- Key people: Mostafa Kandil (CEO); Ahmed Misbah (CFO); Bilal Shahwani (VP Engineering)
- Products: Ridesharing, Vanpool
- Revenue: ▲US$38.35 million (2021)
- Operating income: ▼US$−100.52 million (2021)
- Net income: ▼US$−141.42 million (2021)
- Total assets: ▲US$59.34 million (2021)
- Total equity: ▼US$−89.74 million (2021)
- Number of employees: 606 (December 2021)
- Website: swvl.com

Swvl Holdings Corp. is a Dubai-based provider of intercity, intracity, B2B and B2G transportation products and services. Swvl operates in 135 cities in 20 countries across Latin America, Europe, Africa and Asia. The company went public in March 2022 and is traded on the Nasdaq stock exchange under the ticker SWVL.

== History ==
Swvl was co-founded in Egypt in April 2017 by Mostafa Kandil and two of his school friends, Ahmed Sabbah and Mahmoud Nouh with $30,000 of their own money. After four months, ridesharing company Careem invested $500,000. Swvl began developing an app to address traffic congestion in Cairo, but then switched to developing it as a platform for booking cheap bus trips in the city. In 2018, Swvl closed its Series A and Series B rounds of funding. Series A raised $8 million while Series B raised between $25–35 million, with a company valuation of around $100 million. Both rounds were co-led by Dubai-based BECO Capital, Africa-based investor DiGAME, and Silicon Badia.

In early 2019, Swvl expanded into Kenya, where it partnered with BRCK to provide free Wi-Fi on its buses. In the same year, it also expanded to Nigeria.

In June 2019, the company raised US$42 million from venture-capital firms including Sweden’s Vostok, Dubai-based BECO Capital, China’s MSA, New York–based Endeavor Catalyst, Palo Alto–based Autotech and the Oman Technology Fund.

It subsequently expanded its operations into Pakistan, beginning with Lahore, in July 2019, and into Jordan, beginning with Amman, in November 2019. In October 2019, Swvl was temporarily banned in Kenya along with other bus-hailing apps due to regulatory issues. In late 2019, the company moved headquarters to Dubai.

In July 2021, Swvl signed a merger deal with the special-purpose acquisition company (SPAC) Queen's Gambit Growth Capital, the first SPAC led entirely by women. As part of the deal, Queen’s Gambit CEO Victoria Grace and another executive joined the board of Swvl while two other SPAC members joined Swvl’s advisory board. The deal valued Swvl at $1.5 billion, making it the largest Middle East–based unicorn to go public on the Nasdaq. As part of the transaction, Swvl raised $121.5 million in private investment in public equities (PIPE). PIPE investors included Agility, Chimera, the European Bank for Reconstruction and Development (EBRD), Luxor Capital, Teklas Ventures and Zain.

Shortly after the SPAC merger announcement, Swvl made a number of acquisitions, expanding into Europe and Latin America. In August 2021, Swvl acquired Shotl, an on-demand ride service that uses shuttles in Europe and Brazil. In November 2021, Swvl acquired ViaPool, a private-public hybrid mass transit company with operations in Argentina and Chile. In March 2022, Swvl acquired Door2door, a Berlin-based software company that licenses its technology to cities, transport companies and private providers in ten European countries.

The Queen's Gambit SPAC merger closed on March 31, 2022, and the combined company began trading under the ticker SWVL.

In May 2022, SWVL planned to lay off 32% of its team.

On June 2, 2022, SWVL announced it was significantly reducing its offer of services in the Pakistani market.

In July 2022, SWVL announced that its planned acquisition of a UK-based smart bus company, Zeelo, had been dropped.

The stock dropped by 96% since IPO in less than one year. The company has already gone through two rounds of layoffs in 2022, once in May and another one in November. Company has lost its unicorn status within a short span of achieving it.

On November 18, SWVL completely shut down all operations in Pakistan.

== Leadership ==
Swvl was founded by Mostafa Kandil, Mahmoud Nouh and Ahmed Sabbah in 2017. Nouh and Sabbah left the company in 2019 and 2021, respectively.

CEO Mostafa Kandil previously worked for Rocket Internet, where he launched car sales platform Carmudi in the Philippines. He then worked for ride-sharing company Careem, which is now a subsidiary of Uber.

CFO Youssef Salem previously served as an Executive Director at Moelis & Company and an Associate at QInvest. He is also an adjunct professor of practice at the American University in Cairo. He is attributed for taking the company towards IPO.

== Services ==
Swvl provides ridepooling services with a focus on mass transit. Using the app, customers can reserve and pay for rides on private buses operating on fixed routes. The company’s proprietary algorithm uses the passenger’s location and destination to calculate the quickest trip time. The services provide reliable alternatives to public transportation without the expense of individual ridesharing options. The technology also allows for more efficiency than public transportation, which results in lower emissions. Swvl also provides inter-city rides, car ride-sharing, and corporate services.
