= Valley Metro (disambiguation) =

Valley Metro is the regional transit system in Phoenix, Arizona, U.S.

Valley Metro may also refer to:

- Valley Metro (Roanoke), a bus line in Virginia, U.S.
- Valley Metro, regional transit services of Lower Rio Grande Valley Development Council, Texas, U.S.

== See also ==
- Valley Transit (disambiguation)
