= Valley Transit (Washington) =

Public transit operator in Walla Walla, Washington, U.S.

- Commenced operation: January 5, 1981
- Headquarters: 1401 West Rose Street; Walla Walla, Washington
- Locale: Walla Walla County, Washington
- Service type: Bus service
- Routes: 11
- Fleet: 37 vehicles
- Annual ridership: 502,014 (2024)
- Fuel type: Diesel, gasoline, electric
- General manager: Angelic Peters
- Website: valleytransit.com

Valley Transit is a public transit operator in Walla Walla County, Washington, United States. It operates 11 routes in the cities of Walla Walla and College Place. Since 2022, Valley Transit's buses have been fare-free.

== History ==
Valley Transit was founded as the Walla Walla County Public Transportation Benefit Area in 1979, becoming the county's public transportation benefit area. A 0.3 percent sales tax was approved by voters on March 18, 1980, allowing for service to begin on January 5, 1981. In its first year of operation, the system carried 435,500 passengers.

Until 1997, Valley Transit operated an intercity route to Milton-Freewater, Oregon, through an intergovernmental agreement; it has since been replaced by a bus operated by the city government of Milton-Freewater.

On February 9, 2010, a 0.3 percent increase in sales tax was approved by 76 percent of voters to fund existing service and prevent service cuts. In March 2020, Valley Transit eliminated its normal routes due to the COVID-19 pandemic and reduced service to hour-long loops and a series of shuttles. Fares were also temporarily eliminated. Normal services were restored in March 2023 after staffing levels had recovered. The agency adopted plans to use a fleet of nine battery electric buses, with five in an initial order from BYD Auto; the first three buses delivered in 2025 were sent back to the manufacturer due to defects found during inspections.

== Routes ==
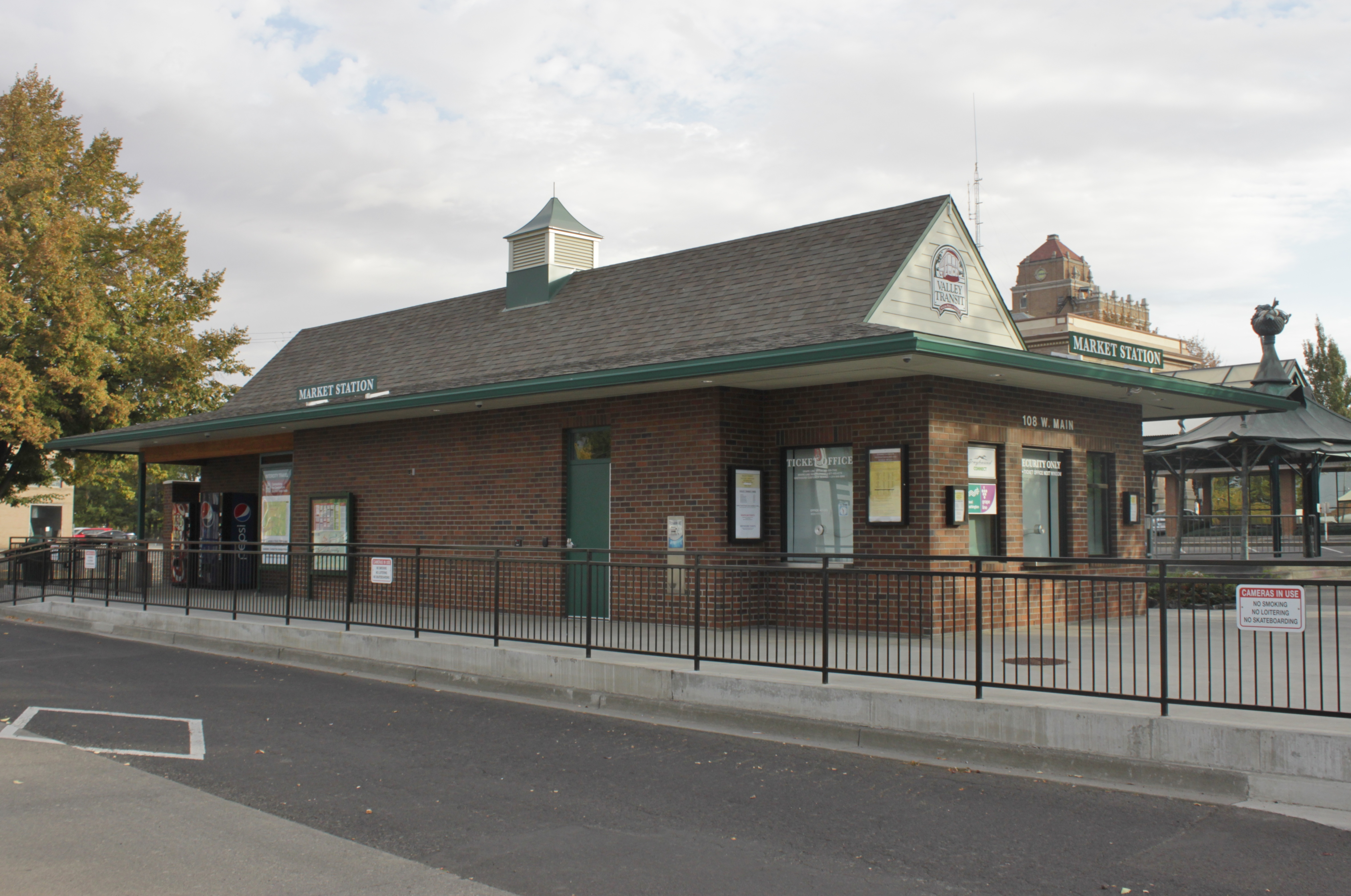
Market Station in downtown Walla Walla, the main hub of Valley Transit

As of 2023, Valley Transit operates 10 routes in Walla Walla and surrounding communities. These routes generally run every 30 to 60 minutes from Monday to Saturdays.

The agency also connects to several intercity bus routes, operated by other providers, at the Walla Walla Transit Center in downtown Walla Walla:

- Travel Washington's Grape Line, operating 3 daily round trips to Pasco
- Kayak Public Transit, operated by the Confederated Tribes of the Umatilla Indian Reservation
- Milton-Freewater Bus to Milton-Freewater, Oregon
- Columbia County Public Transportation to Dayton and Prescott

== Fares ==
Valley Transit began offering fare-free bus and dial-a-ride service during the summer in the mid-2010s to boost ridership. The fare-free service was extended to year-round beginning in 2022 as part of a four-year pilot program funded by the state government's Move Ahead Washington package.

The agency's fares were formerly 50 cents for passengers aged 5 years or older and free to those under 5 (up to three per fare-paying rider). Monthly passes and ticket books were also offered. Valley Transit began using smartphone payments through Token Transit in 2018.
