= RiverCities Transit (Washington) =

- Commenced operation: 1975
- Locale: Cowlitz County, Washington
- Service type: Bus service
- Routes: 7
- Fuel type: Diesel
- Operator: Cowlitz Transit Authority
- Website: rctransit.org

RiverCities Transit is a public transit system serving the cities of Longview and Kelso in Cowlitz County, Washington, United States. It was established in 1975 and originally named the Community Urban Bus Service (CUBS). RiverCities Transit was adopted as the system's new name in 2011.

== History ==
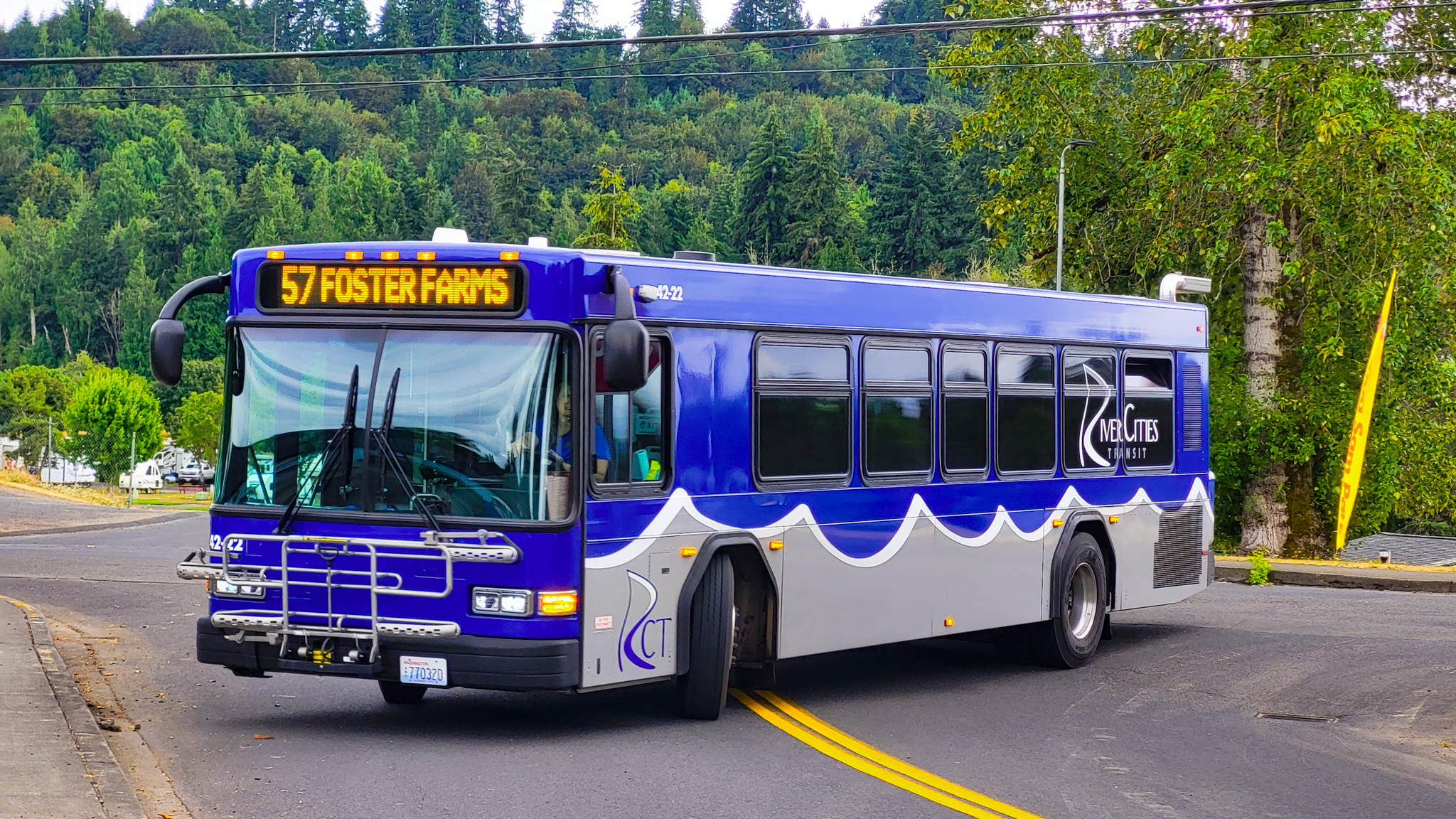
A Route 57 bus near Allen St in Kelso

The City of Longview began operating public transit service on June 16, 1975, following the temporary suspension of service provided by the privately-run Longview–Kelso Bus Company. The city government initially ran a single route through Longview and Kelso with seven daily trips; the Kelso city government also subsidized some costs for the trial until federal grants were obtained. The bus company sold its operations and equipment to the Longview city government in September.

Longview and Kelso partnered with the Cowlitz County government to organize a public transportation benefit area in 1987, and a 0.1 percent sales tax to fund the bus system was approved by 77.3 percent of voters on September 15, 1987. The existing service, then named the "Community Urban Bus Service" (CUBS), was transferred to the Cowlitz Transit Authority on January 1, 1988. In 2008, CUBS put a 0.2 percent sales tax increase up for public vote, seeking $2 million in additional annual revenue to continue running service and expanding frequency and hours of operation. The increase was approved by voters, bringing the total sales tax to 0.3 percent.

The Cowlitz Transit Authority adopted a 10-year "Transit Enhancement Plan" in 2010, proposing a re-branded system with more frequent service and newer buses. In 2011, CUBS began exploring a re-brand, complete with a new name, using an online poll. "RiverCities Transit" was announced as the winner later that month, and a new blue-and-gray color scheme was adopted for the system's bus fleet the following year. A new route system, focusing on corridors where buses run every 30 to 60 minutes, debuted in August 2013; an express route between Longview and Kelso debuted earlier that year in April, reducing travel times.

RiverCities Transit opened the new Downtown Transit Center in Longview in 2020. It includes administrative offices for the agency and training facilities for drivers. RiverCities Transit is planned to expand into inter-county service on July 1, 2025, with the debut of commuter routes from Longview to Rainier, Oregon, and Vancouver, Washington. The two routes replace existing rural bus service provided by the non-profit Lower Columbia Community Action Program that is set to end service in June 2025 due to a lack of funding. The new routes will have daily service on weekdays and are partially funded by a grant from the Federal Transit Administration.

== Fleet ==
As of March 2014

Year	Manufacturer	Model	Fleet Numbers	Qty.	Capacity	Fuel type	Notes
1998	Gillig	Phantom 30'	42-29	1	29	Diesel	
2002	Gillig	Phantom 35'	42-01–42-04	4	35	Diesel	
2003	Gillig	Phantom 35'	42-05–42-06	2	35	Diesel	
2009	Gillig	Low Floor 35'	42-07	1	32	Diesel	
2011	Gillig	Low Floor HEV 35'	42-09	1	32	Diesel-electric hybrid	
2013	Gillig	BRT 35'	42-10–42-13	4	32	Diesel	
