= Washington State Department of Ecology =

Environmental protection agency for Washington State, United States of America

Department of Ecology

Agency overview
- Formed: February 23, 1970
- Headquarters: 300 Desmond Drive Southeast; Lacey, Washington, U.S.
- Employees: approx. 2,100 (2023)
- Annual budget: $2.8 billion (2023-2025)
- Agency executive: Casey Sixkiller, Director
- Website: ecology.wa.gov

The Washington State Department of Ecology (sometimes referred to simply as "Ecology" or by its code ECY) is the state of Washington's environmental regulatory agency. Created on February 23, 1970, it was the first environmental regulation agency in the United States, predating the creation of the Environmental Protection Agency (EPA) by several months.

The department administers laws and regulations pertaining to the areas of water quality, water rights and water resources, shoreline management, toxics clean-up, nuclear waste, hazardous waste, and air quality. It also conducts monitoring and scientific assessments of various contaminated sites in Washington. The Department of Ecology has a $2.8 billion budget for the 2023–25 biennium and approximately 2,100 full-time employees.

== Duties ==
The department's authorizing statute is RCW 43.21A. It is responsible for administering and overseeing the Shoreline Management Act of 1971 (RCW 90.58), which requires towns to create and use Shoreline Master Programs. These programs are employed as policies for land use for Washington shorelines after approval from Ecology. Ecology is also responsible for the state Water Code (RCW 90.03), the state Water Pollution Control Act (RCW 90.48), and the state Clean Air Act (RCW 70.94).

In addition, Ecology is in charge of enforcement of the Model Toxics Control Act of 1988 (MTCA) which funds the investigation and cleanup of contaminated sites throughout Washington, as well as requires polluters to pay for cleanup and oversight. As of 2025, more than 7,700 of roughly 14,000 known contaminated sites have been cleaned by MTCA. It is funded by the Hazardous Substance Tax on petroleum products and pesticides.

The State Environmental Policy Act (SEPA) is also run by Ecology. It provides guidelines for governmental decision-making related to the environment of the state. SEPA reviews permits for both public and private projects, and works to identify and analyze the positive and negative environmental impact of various policies and permits relating to the Washington environment.

Appeals of Ecology's decisions are made to the Environmental Hearings office, which includes the Pollution Control Hearings Board and the Shoreline Hearings Board, as well as several other boards that address appeals of decisions by the state Department of Fish and Wildlife and the Department of Natural Resources.

== Administration ==
=== Leadership ===
The Director of the Department of Ecology is appointed by the Governor and subject to confirmation by the State Senate. The current director is Casey Sixkiller, who replaced Laura Watson in 2025.

=== Offices ===
The department has its headquarters office in Lacey, Washington, near the campus of St. Martin's University; four regional offices located in Lacey (Southwest Region), Union Gap (Central Region), Shoreline (Northwest Region) and Spokane (Eastern Region); and field offices in Port Orchard, Manchester, Bellingham, Mount Vernor, Richland, and Vancouver.

== History ==
The Washington State Department of Ecology was authorized on February 12, 1970, by the state Senate and signed into law by Governor Dan Evans preceding the formation of the EPA. Ecology was the first of its kind in terms of state-level environmental organizations. In its first few years Ecology served to consolidate four state agencies: Water Resources, the Water Pollution Control Commission, Air Quality Control, and Solid Waste Sections.

In the early 2000's, the Department of Ecology received national attention from its campaign against trucker bombs (bottles of urine thrown by semi-truck drivers from open windows) which was humorously highlighted by Jon Stewart on the Daily Show. Ecology had increased the fine for highway littering from as low as $95 up to $1025. The campaign was brought on after a previous campaign that ended due to budget cuts had led to a 25% reduction in highway littering.

== Programs ==
The Ecology Youth Corps is a summer jobs program for teenagers in Washington that is managed by the Department of Ecology. Established in 1975, the program is tasked with cleaning litter on state highways and pays hired teenagers a minimum wage.

The Department of Ecology began a vehicle inspection program in 1982, requiring vehicles registered within the state to be inspected for emissions quality. The program ended on December 31, 2019, following a 14-year phase-out approved by the state legislature in 2005 as air quality in Washington cities had improved to above federal standards. Some emissions testing facilities, including two in Seattle, were repurposed as drive-thru COVID-19 testing sites during the 2020 pandemic.

The department, via its Office of Chehalis Basin (OCB) and the Chehalis River Basin Flood Authority, oversees and funds flood control programs and initiatives, as well as habitat concerns, for the Chehalis River and its watershed.

Ecology also sponsors multiple other anti-litter and pro-recycling programs to inform and direct Washington citizens towards environmentalist causes.

== See also ==
- PUD No. 1 of Jefferson County v. Washington Department of Ecology
