= Grays Harbor Transit =

Washington public transit agency

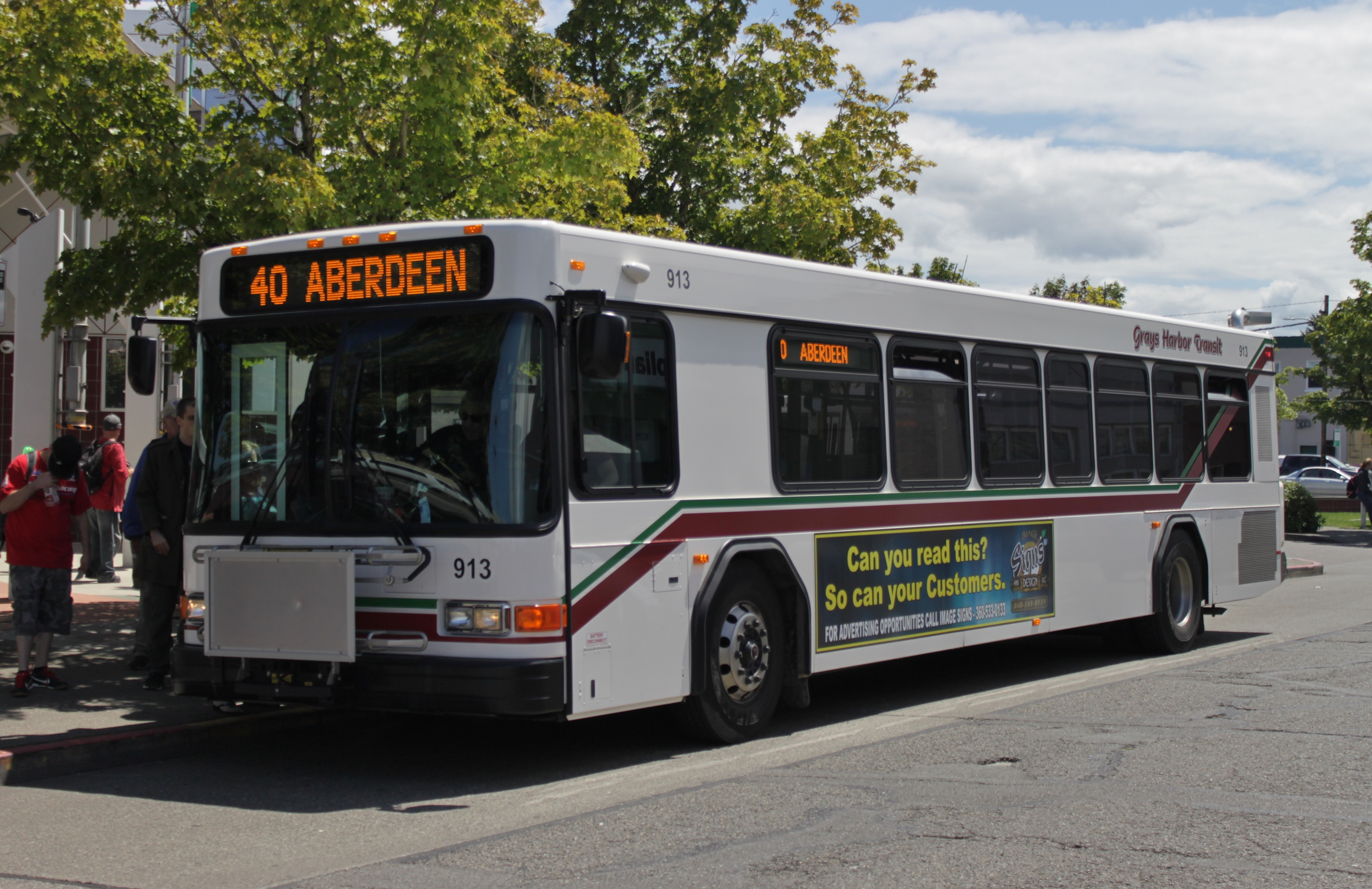
- Grays Harbor Transit bus at Olympia Transit Center
- Commenced operation: June 16, 1975
- Headquarters: Hoquiam, Washington
- Locale: Grays Harbor County, Washington
- Service type: Bus, paratransit, vanpool
- Routes: 11
- Fleet: 32 buses
- Annual ridership: 971,600 (2024)
- General manager: Ken Mehin
- Website: ghtransit.com

The Grays Harbor Transportation Authority, doing business as Grays Harbor Transit (and abbreviated as GH Transit), is a public transit agency serving Grays Harbor County in the U.S. state of Washington. It operates eleven fixed bus routes traveling through the county's major cities and connecting to Olympia in Thurston County and Centralia in Lewis County, as well as paratransit service, dial-a-ride routes, and a vanpool fleet.

The agency, one of the first county transit authorities to be established in Washington state, began operations on June 16, 1975, and is one of few in the state that are not governed as a public transportation benefit area. It replaced a private company, Tri-City Transit, that had discontinued service in 1968. Grays Harbor Transit was initially approved to use a 0.3 percent sales tax and instead cut the tax to 0.2 percent after it had a budget surplus. The agency received $2.4 million from the federal government to purchase 11 buses and had a ridership of 550,000 passengers in 1979. Grays Harbor Transit opened the Aberdeen Transit Center, which was designed to resemble a classical railroad depot, in March 1988.

In 2024, Grays Harbor Transit carried 890,925 passengers on its buses and 59,971 on paratransit. The entire system has been fare-free since 2022 due to funding from the state Climate Commitment Act.

== Administration ==
Grays Harbor Transit is a county transit authority that is governed by a board of directors with six voting members and a non-voting labor representative. The voting members are divided between the three Grays Harbor County commissioners and the mayors of three municipalities with varying populations. The agency is funded by a 0.7 percent sales tax that was last raised in 2014.

== Fleet ==
The agency has a fleet of 32 buses that were manufactured by Gillig and vary in length between 35 and 40 feet (11 and 12 m). They are able to carry 29 to 35 seated passengers and two wheelchairs. Grays Harbor Transit also has 18 minibuses for paratransit use and 20 passenger vans for vanpool. The buses are maintained at a Maintenance & Operations facility in Hoquiam, adjacent to the agency's administrative offices. The maintenance facility covers 2.5 acres (1.0 ha) of land and was built in 1978.
