= Vanpool =

Form of shared transportation

Vanpools or vanpooling is an element of the transit system that allow groups of people to share the ride similar to a carpool, but on a larger scale with concurrent savings in fuel and vehicle operating costs and thus usually a lower cost to the rider. Vanpools have a lower operating and capital cost than most transit vehicles in the United States, but due to their relatively low capacity, vanpools often require subsidies comparable to conventional bus service.

Vehicles may be provided by individuals, individuals in cooperation with various public and private support programs, through a program operated by or on behalf of an element of government, or a program operated by or on behalf of an employer.

The key concept is that people share the ride from home or one or more common meeting locations and travel together to a common destination or work center.

A number of programs exist (within the United States) to help lower the cost of that shared ride to the end user. Among these are traditional funding available to public agencies, public-private partnerships, and the Best Work Places for Commuters (Commuter Choice Programs). A tax benefit is available under 26 U.S.C. §132(f) Qualified Transportation Fringe Benefit allowances. These public transportation programs seek to reduce the number of cars on the road (with all the attendant environmental benefits).

Additional benefits include:

- Speed: The van can use the HOV (High Occupancy Vehicle) lanes because normally more than 2-3 people ride.
- Fixed schedule (makes transit more predictable).
- Saving the cost of gasoline (in some cases, it is part of the program).
- Riders often can have significant reductions in the cost of personal automobile insurance (insurance for the rideshare component is usually provided as part of the vanpool program).
- Incentives from local/federal transportation authorities offset cost.

In many cases, an employer may elect to subsidize the cost of the vanpool and the vehicles' maintenance. In some cases, the vehicles are provided and maintained by the municipality; in others, they are provided in partnership with or by a third-party provider. For example, UCLA operates an extensive network of vans in which faculty, staff, and students are eligible for discounted rates, although anyone commuting to the Westwood area is allowed to participate, with drivers receiving the highest discounts. The vans are centrally maintained, fueled, and cleaned.

The King County Metro Vanpool Program is a successful demand responsive transport program in the Puget Sound area, specifically in King County, Washington. Other successful programs are operated by Pace in Illinois and Utah Transit Authority in Utah.

Vanpooling was begun in the early nineteen seventies by a company called People’s Vans by founder Victor Paglia in 1972 to address the need for people to acquire affordable travel cross country.

The oldest multi-employer vanpool program in the country is in Treasure Valley, Idaho. For over 30 years Ada County Highway District’s Commuteride Vanpools have been crisscrossing the Valley helping commuters go to and from work, with their numerous vanpool routes traveling throughout the Treasure Valley. The Vanpools also service the Military at Gowen Field and Mountain Home Air Force Base (MHAFB) with multiple routes to and from Ada and Canyon County. ACHD Commuteride serves the cities, Boise, Meridian, Kuna, Garden City, Eagle and Star as well as Ada County.

Private firms operate vanpools for individuals, as well as in cooperation with employers or under contract.

Another notable example is Swvl, a NASDAQ publicly held company, that is providing Vanpooling services in 18 countries.

== See also ==
- Demand responsive transport
- Dollar van
- Airport bus
