= East Milwaukie station =

Former train station in Milwaukie, Oregon

East Milwaukie, OR
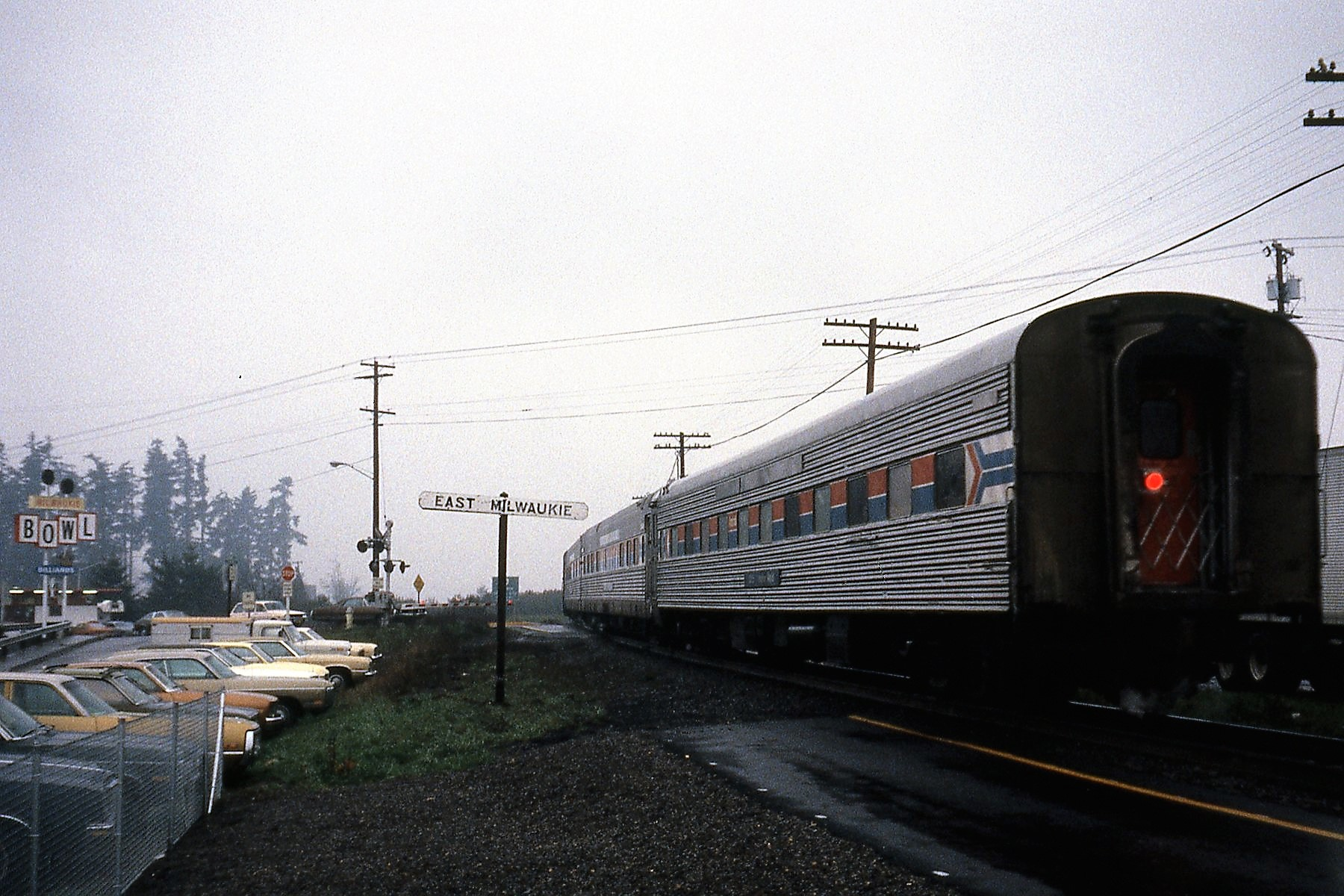
- The Coast Starlight passing the station in 1980

General information
- Location: SE Harrison Street and Oregon Route 224
- Coordinates: 45°26′47.2″N 122°37′51.2″W
- Line: Brooklyn Subdivision
- Platforms: 1 side platform
- Tracks: 1

History
- Opened: 1980
- Closed: 1981

Services
Preceding station	Amtrak	Following station
Woodburn toward Eugene	Willamette Valley	Portland Terminus
Woodburn toward Eugene	Mount Rainier	Portland toward Seattle
Location

East Milwaukie station, also known as Milwaukie, was a short-lived Amtrak train station in Milwaukie, Oregon in service from 1980 to 1981. It was located just east of the intersection of Harrison Street and Highway 224. The station was served by the Willamette Valley and Mount Rainier.
