= Woodburn station =

Woodburn, OR

General information
- Location: between Lincoln & Young Streets; Woodburn, Oregon
- Coordinates: 45.1431°N 122.8555°W
- Line: Southern Pacific
- Tracks: 2

History
- Opened: 1980 (Amtrak)
- Closed: 1981 (Amtrak)

Services
Preceding station	Amtrak	Following station
Salem toward Eugene	Willamette Valley	East Milwaukie toward Portland
Salem toward Eugene	Mount Rainier	East Milwaukie toward Seattle
Preceding station	Southern Pacific Railroad	Following station
Gervais toward Oakland Pier	Shasta Route	Hubbard toward Portland
Location

Woodburn station was a train station in Woodburn, Oregon.

== History ==
Woodburn was originally a station on the Southern Pacific Cascade Line, with regular service by the Klamath and Rogue River.

Amtrak served the city from 1980 to 1981. The stop was located between Lincoln and Young Streets. The station was served by the Willamette Valley and Mount Rainier.
