= Willamette Valley (disambiguation) =

The Willamette Valley is a geographic region in northwest Oregon, United States.

Willamette Valley may also refer to:

- Willamette Valley (ecoregion), the associated ecoregion
- Willamette Valley (train), Amtrak-operated train in the same area
- Willamette Valley AVA, the American Viticultural Area in the region
- MV Willamette Valley, a 1928 Q-ship that served as HMS Edgehill during World War 2
- Willamette Valley Academy, a private educational institution in Beaverton, Oregon, located at 16100 NW Cornell Rd Suites 210 and 290 97209.
