= Siemens Venture =

Single-level passenger railcar model

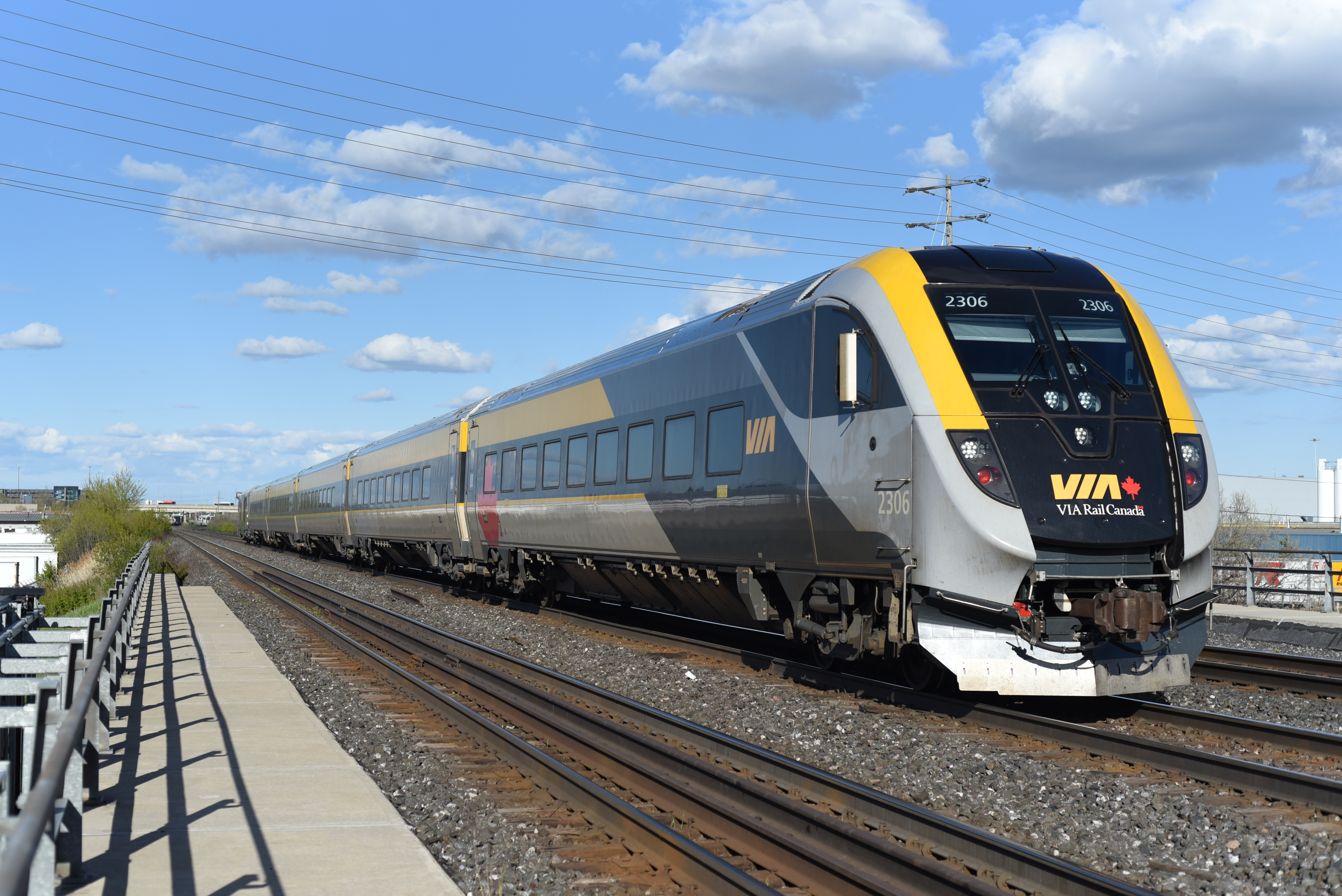
- Siemens Venture trainset with SCV-42-derived cab car in gray and yellow Via Rail livery

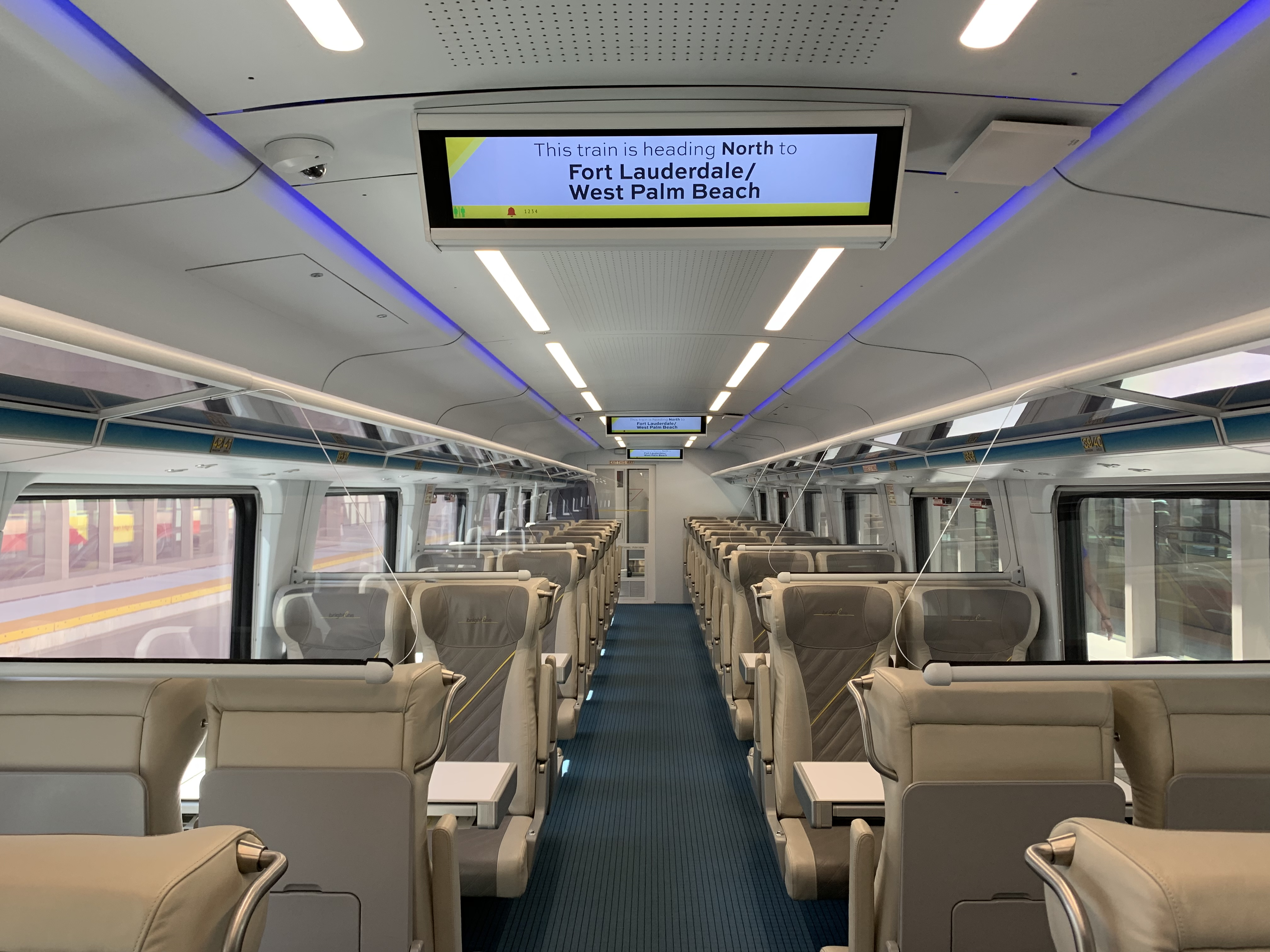
- Interior of a Siemens Venture car operated by Brightline.
- In service: 2018–present
- Manufacturer: Siemens Mobility
- Built at: Florin, California
- Family name: Siemens Viaggio
- Constructed: 2015–present
- Number built: 938 cars (includes cars on order; see Operators section for details)
- Capacity: Business: Up to 54; Cab (Economy): Up to 62; Economy: Up to 74

Specifications
- Car length: 85 ft (25,908 mm)
- Width: 10 ft 6 in (3,201 mm)
- Height: 14 ft (4,268 mm)
- Floor height: 4 ft 3 in (1,296 mm)
- Platform height: Level boarding: 4 ft (1,219 mm); Step boarding: 8 in (203 mm)
- Entry: Level (Brightline); Level and step (other operators)
- Wheelbase: 59 ft 6 in (18,136 mm) between truck centers
- Maximum speed: 125 mph (201 km/h)
- Weight: 112,000 lb (50,802 kg)
- Coupling system: Janney Type H Tightlock
- Track gauge: 4 ft 8 1/2 in (1,435 mm) standard gauge

Siemens Venture is a type of locomotive-hauled passenger railroad car built by Siemens Mobility for the North American market. The cars are derived from the Siemens Viaggio Comfort cars used in Europe, with adaptations for North American operations. The cars entered service with Brightline in 2018 and with Amtrak Midwest (services funded by Illinois, Michigan, Missouri, and Wisconsin) in 2022. They have also been ordered by Amtrak for national and other state-supported routes (including those in California, Washington, Oregon, New York, Pennsylvania, Massachusetts, Maine, Virginia, North Carolina, and Vermont), Via Rail, and Ontario Northland. The Venture cars will also be used on Amtrak Airo trainsets.

== History ==
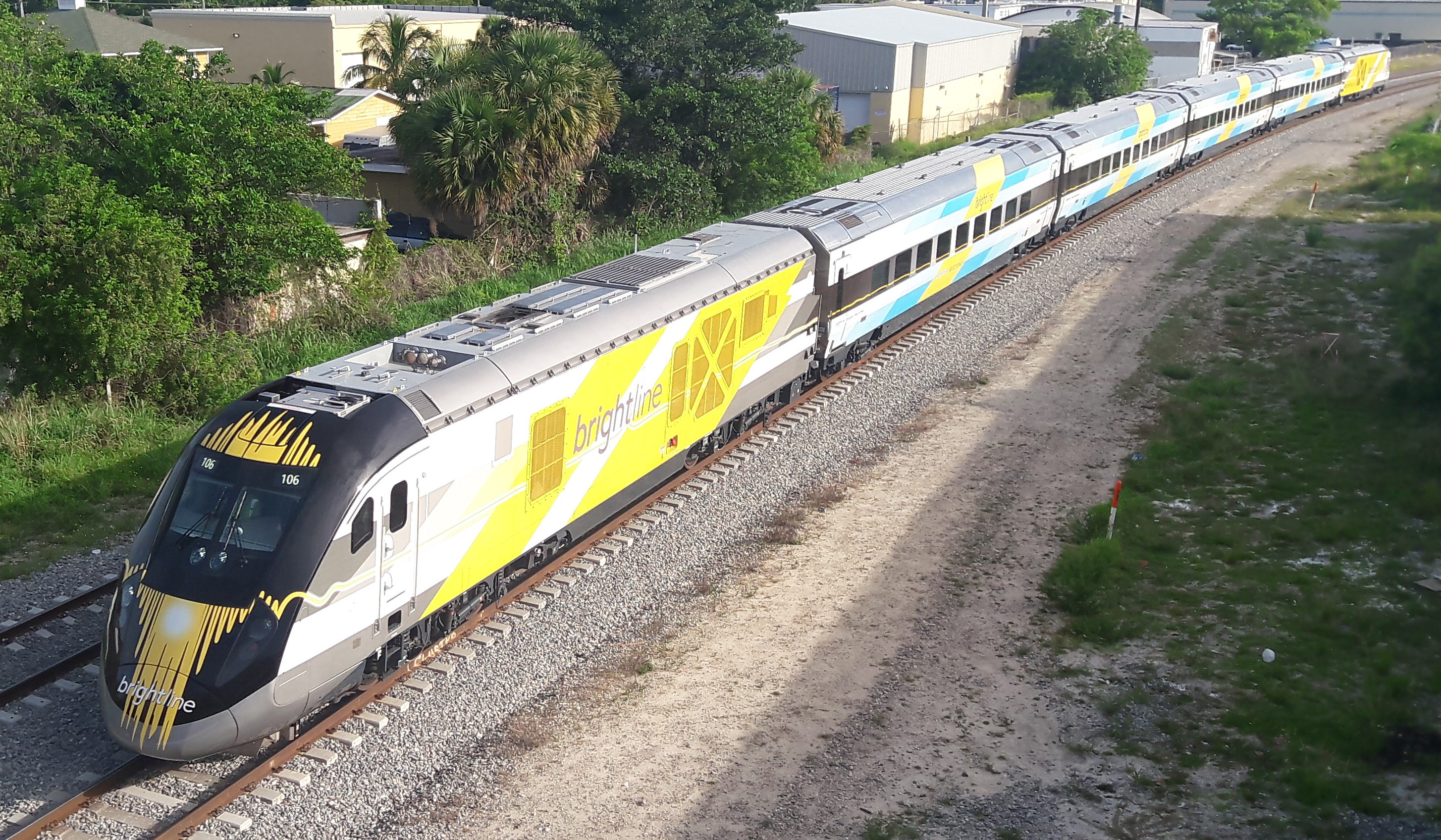
A test train of Brightline in May 2017

The Venture dates back to 2014 when All Aboard Florida (now Brightline) purchased five trainsets for its new Brightline service along with ten Siemens Charger SCB-40 diesel-electric locomotives. The passenger cars, named the Venture, were derived from the Siemens Viaggio Comfort cars used in Europe, with adaptations for North American operations. They were built at the Siemens factory in Florin, California, starting in July 2015. The first trainset was completed in December 2016. Public operations began on January 13, 2018.

In November 2017, a coalition of states with state-supported Amtrak routes ordered 137 Venture railcars through its contractor Sumitomo Corporation. The order included seven trainsets for California and 88 cars for Illinois, Michigan, and Missouri (Amtrak Midwest) as married pairs and single coaches. The Ventures were the coalition's second passenger railcar order; the first order of Next Generation Bi-Level Passenger Rail Cars was canceled after the prototype, built by Sumitomo's subcontractor, Nippon Sharyo, failed a buff strength test in August 2015. The first three Venture cars entered testing in February 2020. They were originally planned to enter revenue service in July 2020 but were delayed, not making their first run until February 1, 2022, on a Lincoln Service train.

On December 12, 2018, Canada's national passenger rail service operator, Via Rail, announced that it was purchasing 32 Venture trainsets to replace the entire fleet used on its Québec City–Windsor Corridor. The first trainset was delivered for testing in 2021. They progressively entered service between 2022 and 2024.

In August 2019, the state of Wisconsin used a Federal Railroad Administration grant to purchase six Venture coaches and three cab cars. The six coaches will be added to the Amtrak Midwest pool while the three cab cars will be used exclusively for Hiawatha trains.

In April 2021, Amtrak announced that they would order 83 trainsets to replace the aging Amfleet I fleet and Metroliner cab cars. The contract was signed in July 2021 and includes 20 years of after-delivery service and support. On October 13, 2023, Siemens unveiled their Venture car prototype for the new Amtrak Airo equipment.

== Configuration ==
Siemens Venture trainsets, showing cab cars (left) and their respective Charger locomotives (right), as well as Via Rail trainsets with SCV-42 cab design (top) and Amtrak Airo traisets with ALC-42 cab design (bottom)

Most Siemens Venture cars (except those for Amtrak Midwest) are configured as trainsets, semi-permanently coupled together with wide open gangways between cars and standard couplers on the ends for connecting the trainset to other railway equipment. Venture trainsets are often paired with Charger diesel-electric locomotives, also manufactured by Siemens, in semi-permanent consists. Venture cars and Charger locomotives share a similar design, but Venture cars have convex sides, whereas Charger locomotives have flat, vertical sides. Most Venture trainsets configured as push-pull trains with a control car, which has a cabin identical to SC-44, ALC-42 or SCV-42/SC-42 Charger locomotives. Airo trainsets for the Northeast Corridor also have a hybrid configuration using a Charger diesel-electric locomotive and a special power car which is always an end business class car closest to the locomotive, either a battery car or an Auxiliary Power Vehicle (APV) with pantographs, transformer and additional traction motors. Brightline operates Venture trainsets in top and tail configuration with two SCB-40 Charger locomotives, one on each end.

== Operators ==
Owner	Qty.	Notes
Amtrak	156	26 six-car sets, includes cab car and catenary power car
Amtrak	256	32 eight-car sets, includes cab car and catenary power car
Amtrak	102	17 six-car trainsets, includes cab car and battery car
Amtrak	49	8 six-car sets, includes cab car
Amtrak Midwest	97	34 married pairs, 26 single cars, and 3 single cab cars
Amtrak Gold Runner	49	7 seven-car sets, includes cab car
Brightline	60	10 six-car sets
Ontario Northland	9	3 three-car sets, includes cab car
Via Rail	160	32 five-car sets, includes cab car
Total	938	

=== Amtrak Airo ===
An Airo trainset with ALC-42-derived cab car for the Cascades stopped at Salem

The inside of an Airo car used on the Amtrak Cascades

Amtrak Airo is the brand name for Amtrak's new fleet of trainsets, which pairs Venture cars with a Siemens Charger locomotive and a cab control car. Amtrak plans to deploy 83 Airo trainsets across routes throughout the country. Of these, eight six-car sets are assigned to the Amtrak Cascades service and 75 to intercity routes on the Northeast Corridor.

The first Airo sets entered service on the Cascades on September 30, 2026, with two trainsets operating four daily trips. The dual-mode Airo sets are expected to enter service on the Northeast Regional in 2027.

=== Amtrak Midwest ===
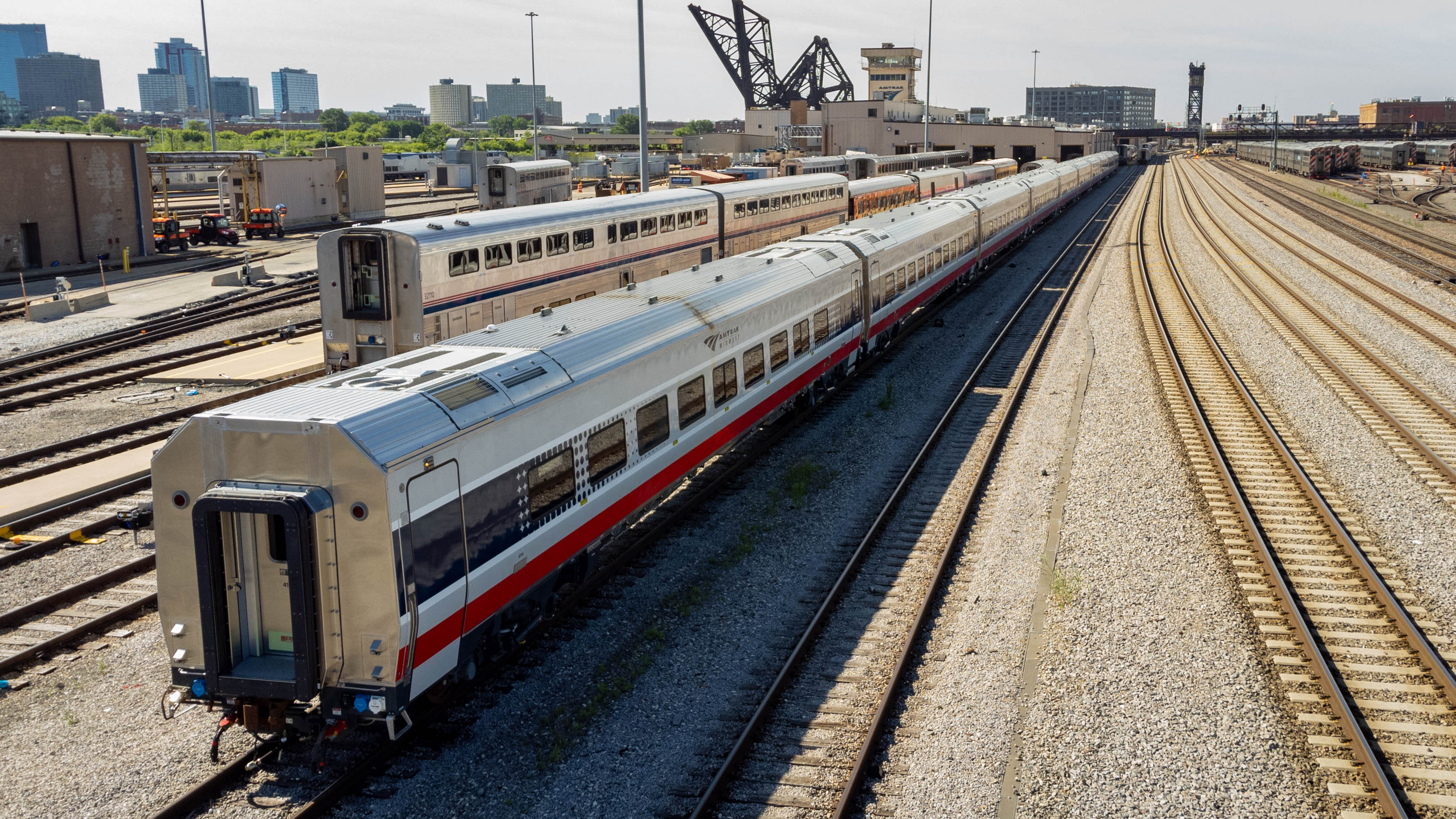
A line of Amtrak Midwest Siemens Venture cars in Chicago's 14th Street Coach Yard

Illinois, Michigan, Missouri, and Wisconsin have ordered 97 Venture cars for the Amtrak Midwest routes, including the Blue Water, Hiawatha, Illini and Saluki, Illinois Zephyr and Carl Sandburg, Lincoln Service, Missouri River Runner, Pere Marquette, and Wolverine.

Of the 97 cars, 68 are built as married pairs (two cars semi-permanently coupled with open gangways), while the remaining 29 are single (unmarried) cars with traditional gangways. Half of the married pairs (17) have a café car and an economy coach, while the remaining 17 have a combination business class/economy class coach and an economy-only coach. The business class and café cars have two vestibules each, while the economy coaches have one. This arrangement—unique among Venture operators—allows trains to be sized to meet the travel demands of individual routes and allows business class seating and cafe cars to be added or removed. Among the 29 single cars are three cab cars with economy seating for exclusive use on Hiawatha trains, expected to enter service in 2026.

=== Amtrak Gold Runner ===
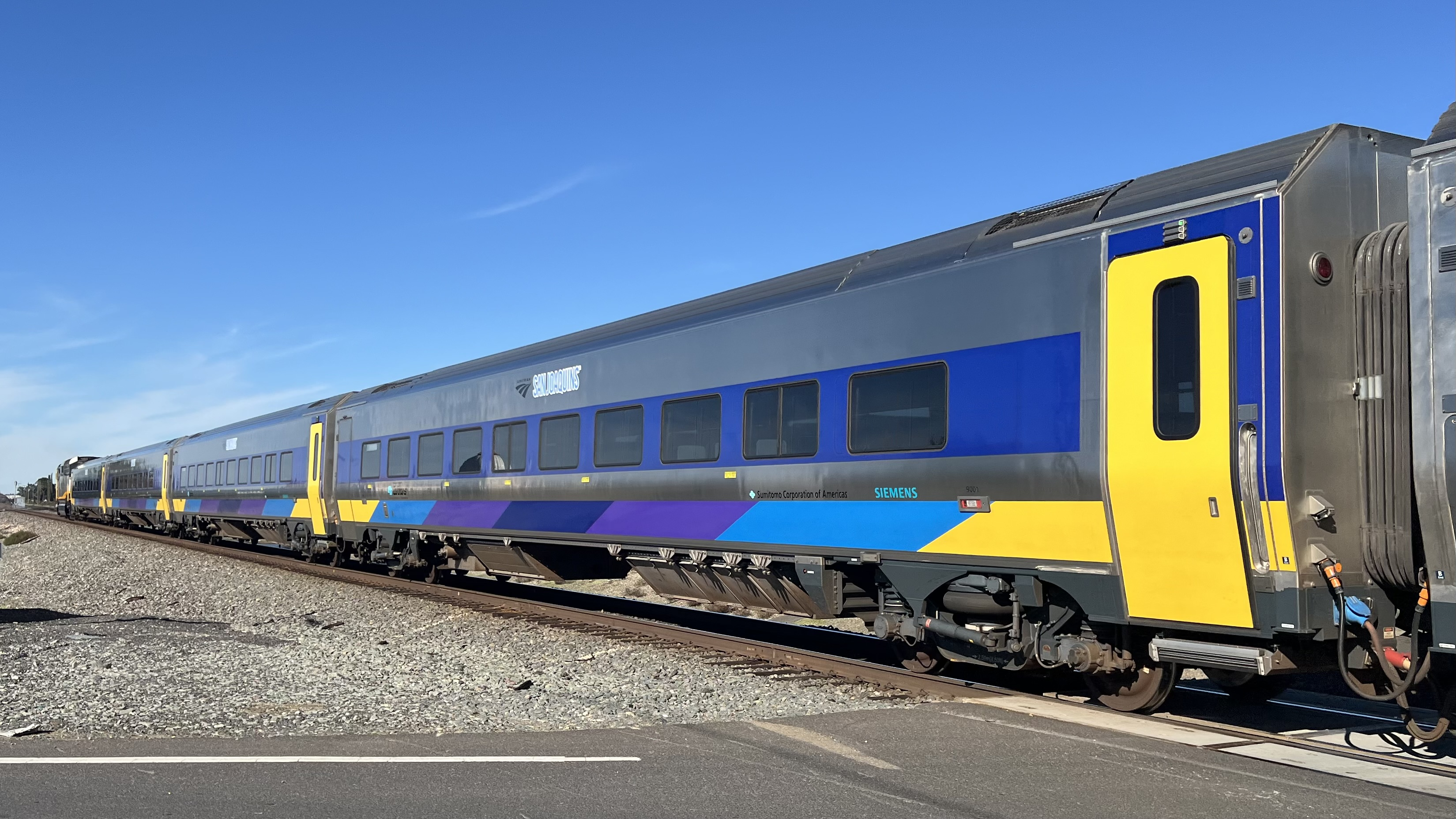
Siemens Venture coaches in Amtrak California San Joaquins livery, including SC-44-derived cab car (top) and intermediate cars (bottom)

For use on the Gold Runner service, the California Department of Transportation has ordered seven Venture trainsets with seven cars each: five coaches, one café car, and one cab-control car. The Gold Runner does not provide business class seating. Per each trainset, the cab-control car and two other cars will each only have one vestibule, while the remaining four cars will each have two. Two coaches per set will have built-in wheelchair lifts for compatibility with the low-platform boarding used at stations on the Gold Runner routes.

The Venture cars began early service on the Gold Runner (then known as the San Joaquins) in December 2023, without café cars and utilizing separate Amtrak NPCU cab-control cars. The San Joaquin Joint Powers Authority (SJJPA) is investigating the use of unstaffed vending machines to provide food service on their Venture sets; presently, the only food service available on Venture sets are "Snack Stations"—grab-and-go selections of complimentary snacks and beverages. The cab-control cars, once delivered, will provide additional space for passenger seating and checked baggage. The SJJPA has not yet disclosed a date for the café or cab-control equipment to enter service.

=== Brightline ===
Brightline has received 10 Venture trainsets consisting of four cars: three with economy seating (branded "Smart Service") and one with business class seating (branded "Premium Service", formerly "Select"). Each trainset has two Siemens Charger SCB-40 diesel-electric locomotives, one on each end. Each trainset currently has a capacity of 248 passengers. Premium Service coaches have fifty 21-inch-wide (530 mm) seats in a 2×1 layout, while Smart Service coaches have sixty-six 19-inch-wide (480 mm) seats in a 2×2 layout.

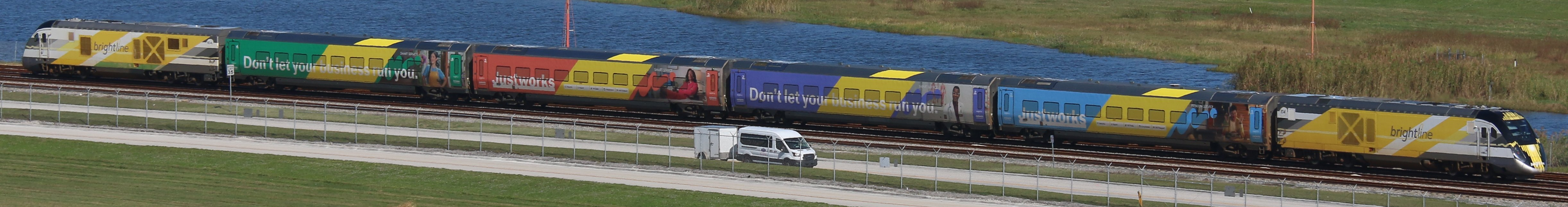
Siemens Venture trainset operated by Brightline with green, red, purple and light-blue coaches and two SCB-40 locomotives

Brightline purchased five trainsets for its initial service between Miami, Fort Lauderdale and West Palm Beach. Five more trainsets were purchased ahead of the extension of the line to Orlando and additional stations opening in Aventura and Boca Raton. An additional 20 cars were purchased to expand the trainsets. They were extended to five-car sets in 2024 and six-car sets in 2025. Brightline expanded some trainsets to ten cars in 2026 and also launched the 'Freedom Express' ten-car trainset painted in special livery.

=== Ontario Northland ===
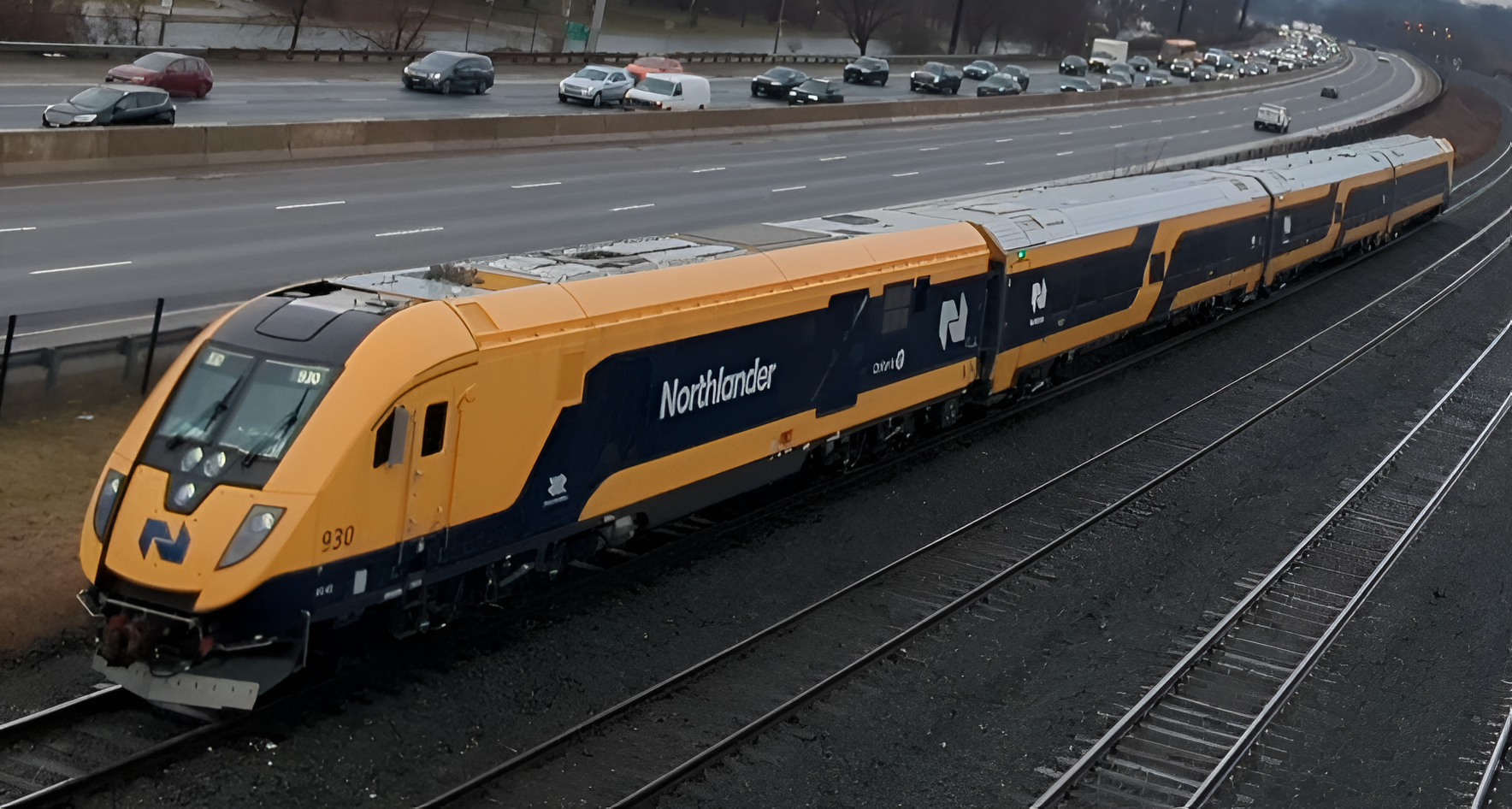
Siemens Charger SC-42 locomotive with Venture trainset being tested on the Northlander

In December 2022, the Government of Ontario and Ontario Northland announced a CA$139.5 million investment to reinstate the Northlander passenger service between Timmins and Toronto. The government announced that it had ordered three, three-car trainsets (two coaches and a cab car) with a food service area, which would be paired with a Charger locomotive. As of April 2026, two of the trainsets have been delivered to Ontario Northland.

=== Via Rail ===
Via Rail purchased 32 five-car trainsets for its Quebec City–Windsor Corridor under a CA$989 million contract awarded in 2018 to Siemens Mobility. The fleet entered service beginning in 2022, progressively replacing the previous equipment used in the Corridor.

Each set consists of two business class coaches, two economy class coaches, and one cab control car with economy seating. According to Via Rail, the configuration is flexible and train length may be adjusted based on demand. Starting in June 2025, some Via Rail trains began operating as extended seven-car sets, where two additional coaches (one economy class and one business class) were taken from other trains. Each trainset operates with a Siemens Charger SCV-42 diesel-electric locomotive. Via Rail trains also run in double set configuration, with two standard five-car and one-locomotive trainsets coupled together, using multiple-unit train control.

Seating is arranged 2×1 in business class and 2×2 in economy class, with seats measuring 19 inches in width. The cars are semi-permanently coupled with open gangways that are wider and better protected from weather exposure than those in the previous fleet. Several cars include a galley area to support at-seat food and beverage service in both classes.

Siemens Venture trainset of Via Rail in special yellow Lumi livery

Almost all Via Rail trainsets are painted in gray, black and yellow paint scheme. One of Via Rail trainsets with 2x17 coaches and 2218 SCV-42 locomotive was painted in a special yellow paint scheme and called Lumi as a tribute to UAC TurboTrains. It was launched in July 2024.

During the winter of 2025–26, the Venture fleet experienced operational issues that reduced availability and led to multiple Corridor cancellations. Some incidents were reported to be associated with winter conditions, including possible snow ingress affecting onboard systems and requiring system restarts. On December 10–11, 2025, a mechanical failure near Brockville, Ontario, delayed approximately 300 passengers for more than 12 hours on a Toronto–Ottawa service. Via Rail stated that it was conducting technical investigations in cooperation with Siemens Mobility, which stated that the trains were designed for reliable year-round operation and supported under a 15-year maintenance agreement valued at approximately CA$23.7 million annually.
