= Amtrak Airo =

Passenger train

- An Amtrak Airo trainset for the Amtrak Cascades stopped at Salem during testing in July 2026

- Coach class on an Airo trainset
- Stock type: Diesel–electric or dual-mode push-pull or double-ended train
- In service: 2026–present
- Manufacturer: Siemens Mobility
- Family name: Siemens Charger, Siemens Venture, EuroSprinter
- Constructed: 2023–present
- Entered service: September 30, 2026
- Operator: Amtrak

Specifications
- Car length: 85 ft (25.9 m)
- Width: 10 ft 6 in (3.2 m)
- Height: 14 ft 7 in (4.4 m)
- Maximum speed: Electric or diesel mode: 125 mph (201 km/h); Battery mode: 60 mph (97 km/h)
- Weight: 6 cars: 1,126,529 lb (510,985 kg)
- Power output: Electric mode: 5,700 hp (4,250 kW); Diesel mode: 4,200 hp (3,100 kW)
- Tractive effort: Starting, electric mode: 365 kN (82,000 lb_{f}); Starting, diesel mode: 290 kN (65,000 lb_{f}); Continuous, diesel mode: 275 kN (62,000 lb_{f}) @ 16 mph (26 km/h)
- Electric systems: Overhead line: (B sets); 25 kV 60 Hz AC; 12.5 kV 60 Hz AC; 12 kV 25 Hz AC; Battery-electric (C sets)
- Braking systems: Locomotive: Dynamic, electropneumatic; APV: regenerative; Trainset: electropneumatic
- Safety systems: Positive train control: ACSES II, I-ETMS
- Track gauge: 4 ft 8 1/2 in (1,435 mm) standard gauge

Notes/references
- Specifications

Amtrak Airo is a class of intercity, high-speed passenger trainsets being built by Siemens Mobility for Amtrak. The trainsets use Siemens Venture passenger cars paired with either Siemens Charger or Siemens ACS-64 locomotives. They will eventually replace older equipment used on the Northeast Corridor and state-supported routes throughout the United States.

== Development ==
The Airo program began in 2019, with Siemens selected as the manufacturer in 2021. Amtrak initially ordered 73 trainsets in 2022, later increasing to 83 in 2023, and finally 126 in 2026. Funding for the first 83 trainsets was provided under the Infrastructure Investment and Jobs Act of 2021. An additional 43 trainsets were ordered for state-supported services in August 2026, using up to $2.05 billion in funding from the USDOT and Federal Railroad Administration's National Railroad Partnership Program.

In July 2025, the first diesel-only D trainset was completed and sent from the Siemens plant in Florin, California to the Transportation Technology Center (TTC) near Pueblo, Colorado for testing. In October 2025, the trainset passed testing at the TTC and was sent for additional testing on the Northeast Corridor. On February 10, 2026, the first D trainset was unveiled at a preview event at Washington Union Station. In May 2026, the first D trainset for the Amtrak Cascades service, began on-location testing and staff training in the Pacific Northwest. On May 28, 2026, the first catenary-diesel, dual-mode B2 trainset for the Northeast Regional was completed.

On November 17, 2026, Amtrak announced the order of an additional eight, 10-car "high capacity" trainsets for the Northeast Regional, due to a surge in demand. Unlike the other Airo trainsets, these sets will use two existing ACS-64 locomotives in a double-ended configuration.

Service started on the Amtrak Cascades on September 30, 2026 with two D trainsets operating four daily trips. Service on the Northeast Regional is expected in late 2027, and on the Carolinian, Downeaster, Keystone, Palmetto, Pennsylvanian, and Vermonter in 2029. Service is expected to start in 2030 on the Adirondack, Empire Service, Ethan Allen Express, and Maple Leaf. The additional 10-car "high capacity" trainsets are expected to enter service on the Northeast Regional in 2031.

== Operations ==
Most Amtrak Airo trainsets are designed to operate on both electrified and non-electrified lines without the need to change locomotives. This is achieved through a hybrid configuration using a Siemens Charger ALC-42E diesel-electric locomotive and either an Auxiliary Power Vehicle (APV) or a battery car.

The Airo trainsets will replace the Amfleet I and Horizon coaches, as well as the Talgo trainsets on the Amtrak Cascades corridor. Amtrak claims safety and reliability improvements by managing operations across entire trainsets rather than on individual cars. Safety will be improved from reducing yard switching, journey times will be shortened by eliminating time-consuming locomotive changes, and reliability will be improved from synchronizing maintenance across a whole trainset rather than on individual cars.

The trainsets have conventional Janney couplers on the front of the locomotive and control car, but the connections between the passenger cars are fixed drawbars, therefore, permanently coupled trainsets. Because of this, equipment wear from constantly coupling and decoupling individual cars will also be reduced, which is necessary with the current fleet as individual cars on a train may be on different maintenance schedules and often need to be removed and replaced. Extensive renovations to maintenance facilities will be done so that they can handle the trainsets.

== Types ==
There are four types of Airo trainsets, with three known as "B", "C", and "D" sets, with different propulsion types, and another batch of 10-car sets. Additionally, there are 3 subtypes of the "B" trainsets.

Trainset types
Type	Power	Sets		Cars per set	Seating			Checked baggage	Services
Type	Power	Sets		Cars per set	Business	Coach	Wheelchair spaces (lifts)	Checked baggage	Services
B1	Diesel + APV	26	83	6	49	286	9 (8)	No	Downeaster, Keystone Service, Vermonter, Pennsylvanian (one trip), Piedmont (future)
B1B	Diesel + APV	26	83	6	49	268	9 (8)	Yes	Carolinian, Palmetto, Pennsylvanian
B2	Diesel + APV	32	83	8	49	430	11 (12)	No	Northeast Regional, some Vermonter trains
C	Diesel + battery car	17	83	6	49	286	9 (8)	No	Adirondack, Empire Service, Ethan Allen Express, Maple Leaf
D	Diesel	8	83	6	49	268	9 (8)	Yes	Amtrak Cascades
TBA	Electric	8	43	10	At least 640			No	Northeast Regional
TBA	TBA	35	43	TBA					

The dual-mode B trainsets are designed to operate on both electrified and non-electrified lines without the need to change locomotives. This is achieved through a hybrid configuration that includes a diesel-electric locomotive (Siemens Charger ALC-42E), and an Auxiliary Power Vehicle (APV). The APV is only used on track with overhead lines. It is the car closest to the locomotive, and is equipped with two pantographs, an underfloor main transformer, and two powered trucks. The remainder of the car has business class seating. In electrified territory, the APV draws power from overhead lines into the four traction motors in the APV, and, via a DC link cable, into the four traction motors in the ALC-42E locomotive. In diesel mode, the motors in the APV are not used. Having the heavy transformer in the APV instead of the locomotive better spreads out the weight and reduces track wear.

There are three subclasses of the B trainsets. B1 sets are 6 cars long and will be used on the Downeaster, Keystone, and Vermonter services. The B1B ("B" for baggage) sets are also 6 cars long, but has additional baggage space in the cab car and fewer seats, and will be used on services such as the Carolinian, Palmetto, and Pennsylvanian, which offer checked baggage service. The B2 sets are 8 cars long and will be used on Northeast Regional services.

The dual-mode C trainsets are 6 cars long as well, but they will have batteries installed instead of the APV's electrical equipment. These sets will be used on the Adirondack, Empire Service, Ethan Allen Express, and Maple Leaf, Amtrak's routes that access New York Penn Station via the Empire Connection tunnel. Although the tunnel has both overhead catenary and third rail electrification, the trainsets will operate using the onboard batteries. In diesel mode, the batteries will not be used. The initial sets, to be delivered in 2028, will be part of a pilot to determine the viability of using battery technology in the tunnel. If the battery pilot proves unviable, later trainsets may use third rail instead of a battery.

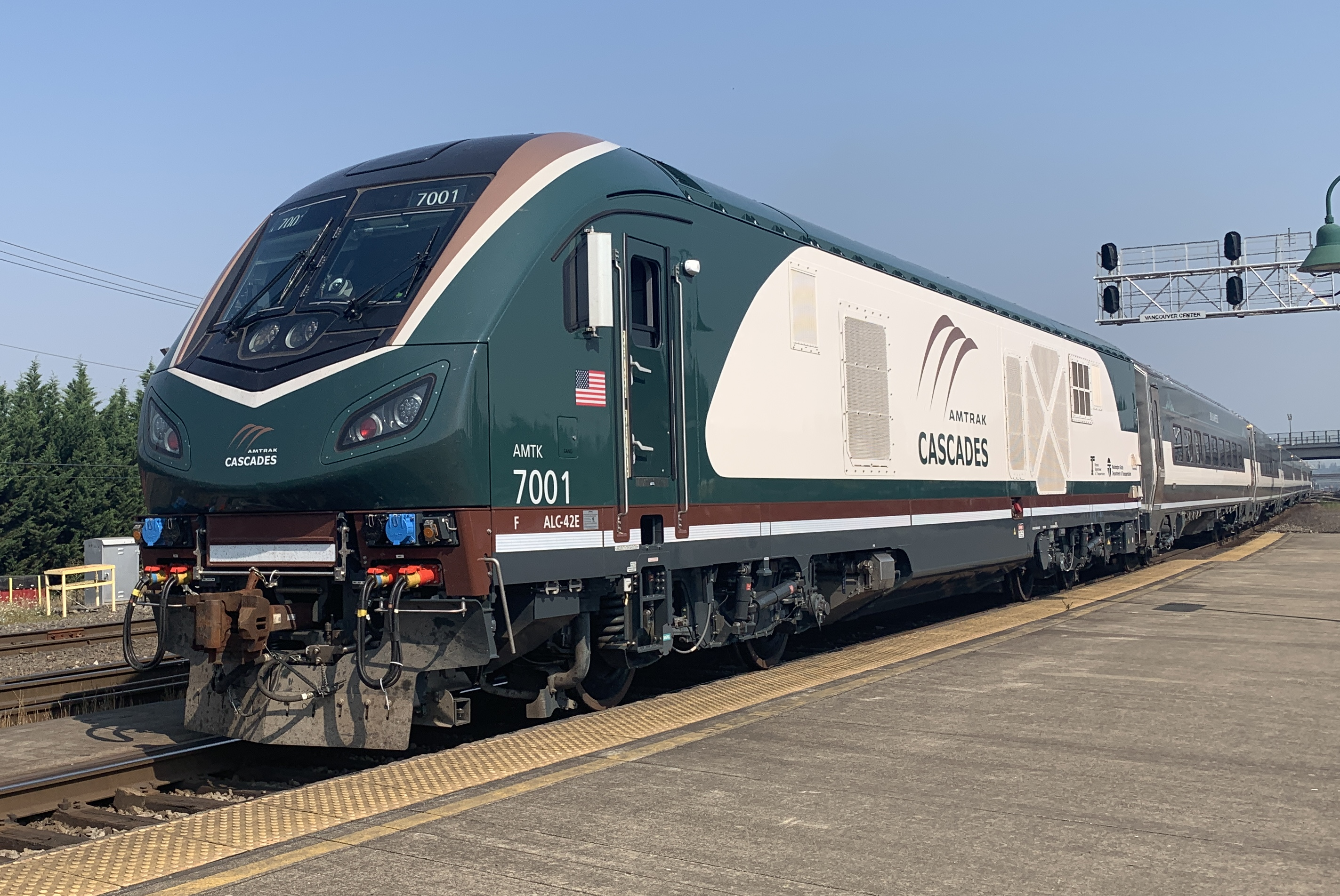
The first diesel-only D trainset with an ALC-42E locomotive in Cascades livery

The diesel-only D trainsets operate without an APV or batteries. The trainsets also have additional baggage space in the cab car. These 6-car sets operate only on the Amtrak Cascades service. Three of the total order of eight D trainsets are paired with new ALC-42E locomotives. The remaining five trainsets were delivered without locomotives and are paired with existing SC-44 locomotives.

Eight "higher-capacity" 10-car trainsets for Northeast Regional service are scheduled to enter service in 2031. Each will seat more than 640 passengers, about 34% more than the eight-car B2 trainsets planned for the same service. The trains will operate in a double-ended configuration with two modernized Siemens ACS-64 electric locomotives. Because the trainsets will be electric-only, they will be restricted to the electrified Northeast Corridor between Boston and Washington, D.C., and will not operate on the unelectrified branches to Springfield or Virginia.

Configurations
Type	1	2	3	4	5	6	7	8
B1	APV/Business	Café	Coach	Coach	Coach	Coach/cab	—N/a	—N/a
B1B	APV/Business	Café	Coach	Coach	Coach	Coach/baggage/cab	—N/a	—N/a
B2	APV/Business	Café	Coach	Coach	Coach	Coach	Coach	Coach/cab
C	Battery/Business	Café	Coach	Coach	Coach	Coach/cab	—N/a	—N/a
D	Business	Café	Coach	Coach	Coach	Coach/baggage/cab	—N/a	—N/a

== Gallery ==
A diesel-only D trainset paired with a SC-44 locomotive

2×1 café car seating with tables

Table seats in coach class

Closed gangways between the cars
