= Amtrak Cascades =

Amtrak service between Vancouver, BC, and Eugene, OR

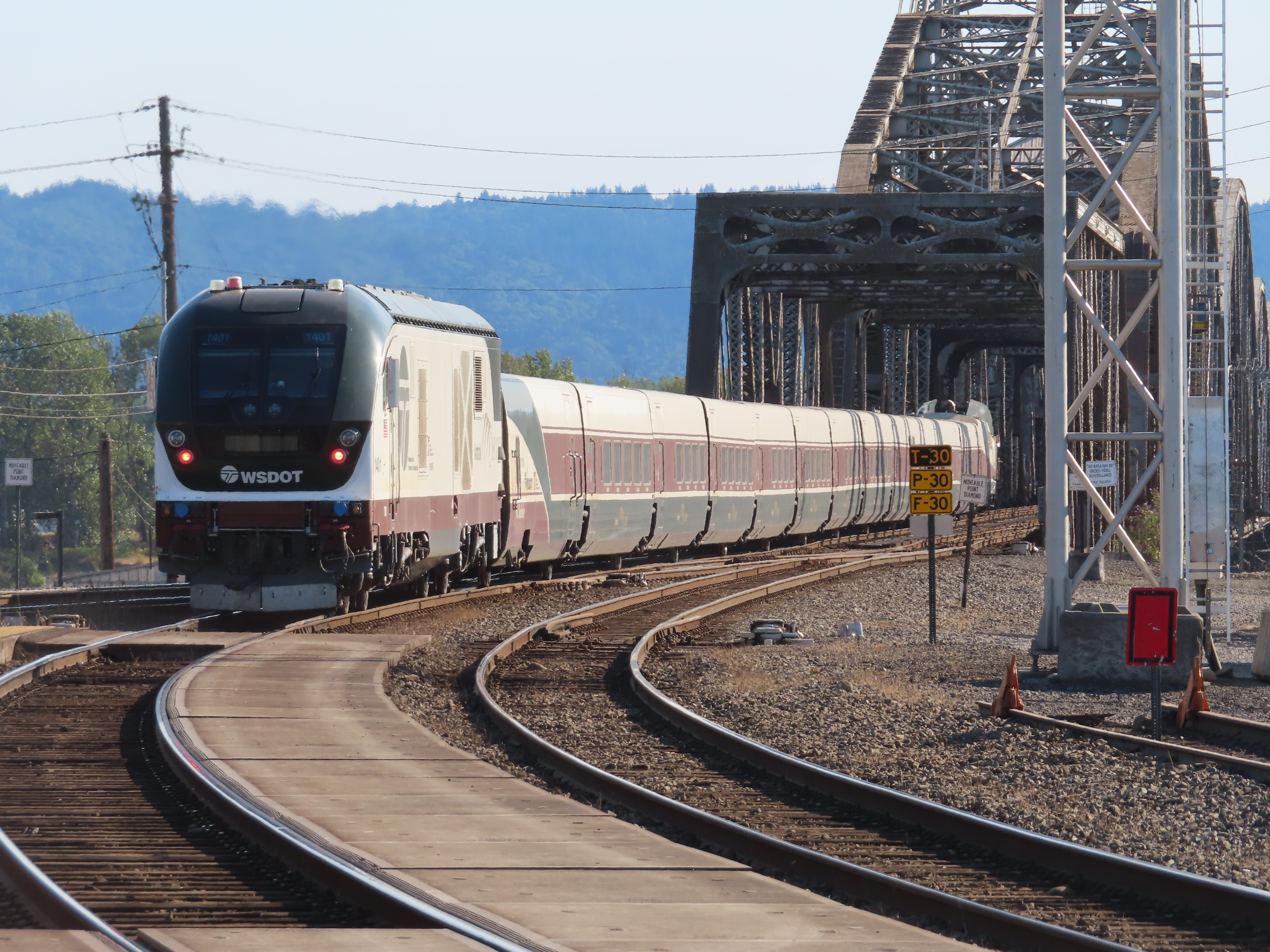
- A Cascades trainset in Vancouver, Washington, 2021

Overview
- Service type: Inter-city rail, Higher-speed rail
- Locale: Pacific Northwest
- Predecessor: BN/UP/SP corridor trains
- First service: May 1, 1971
- Current operators: Amtrak, in partnership with Washington and Oregon Departments of Transportation
- Annual ridership: 951,397 (FY 25) ▲1.4% (Note: Amtrak's Fiscal Year (FY) runs from October 1 of the prior year to September 30 of the named year.)
- Website: amtrakcascades.com

Route
- Termini: Vancouver, British Columbia; Eugene, Oregon
- Stops: 18
- Distance travelled: 460 miles (740 km)
- Train number: 500–519

On-board services
- Classes: Coach Class; Business Class
- Disabled access: Fully accessible
- Seating arrangements: 4 across in coach class 3 across in business class
- Catering facilities: Café car, lounge car
- Baggage facilities: Overhead racks, checked baggage available at selected stations

Technical
- Rolling stock: Siemens Charger; Talgo Series 8 Amtrak Airo
- Track gauge: 4 ft 8 1/2 in (1,435 mm) standard gauge
- Operating speed: 79 mph (127 km/h)
- Track owners: UP, BNSF, Sound Transit

The Amtrak Cascades is a passenger train route in the Pacific Northwest, operated by Amtrak in partnership with the U.S. states of Washington and Oregon. It is named after the Cascade mountain range that the route parallels. The 460-mile (740 km) corridor runs from Vancouver, British Columbia, through Seattle, Washington, and Portland, Oregon, to Eugene, Oregon.

As of December 2023, seven round trips operate along the corridor each day: one Vancouver–Seattle, one Vancouver–Seattle–Portland, three Seattle–Portland, and two Seattle–Portland–Eugene. No train travels the entire length of the corridor. For trains that do not travel directly to Vancouver or Eugene, connections are available on Amtrak Thruway bus services. Additionally, Amtrak Thruway services offer connections to other destinations in British Columbia, Idaho, Oregon, and Washington not on the rail corridor.

In the fiscal year 2017, Cascades was Amtrak's eighth-busiest route with a total annual ridership of over 810,000. In fiscal year 2018, farebox recovery ratio for the train was 63%. On-time performance in FY2021 was 58.7%.

== History ==
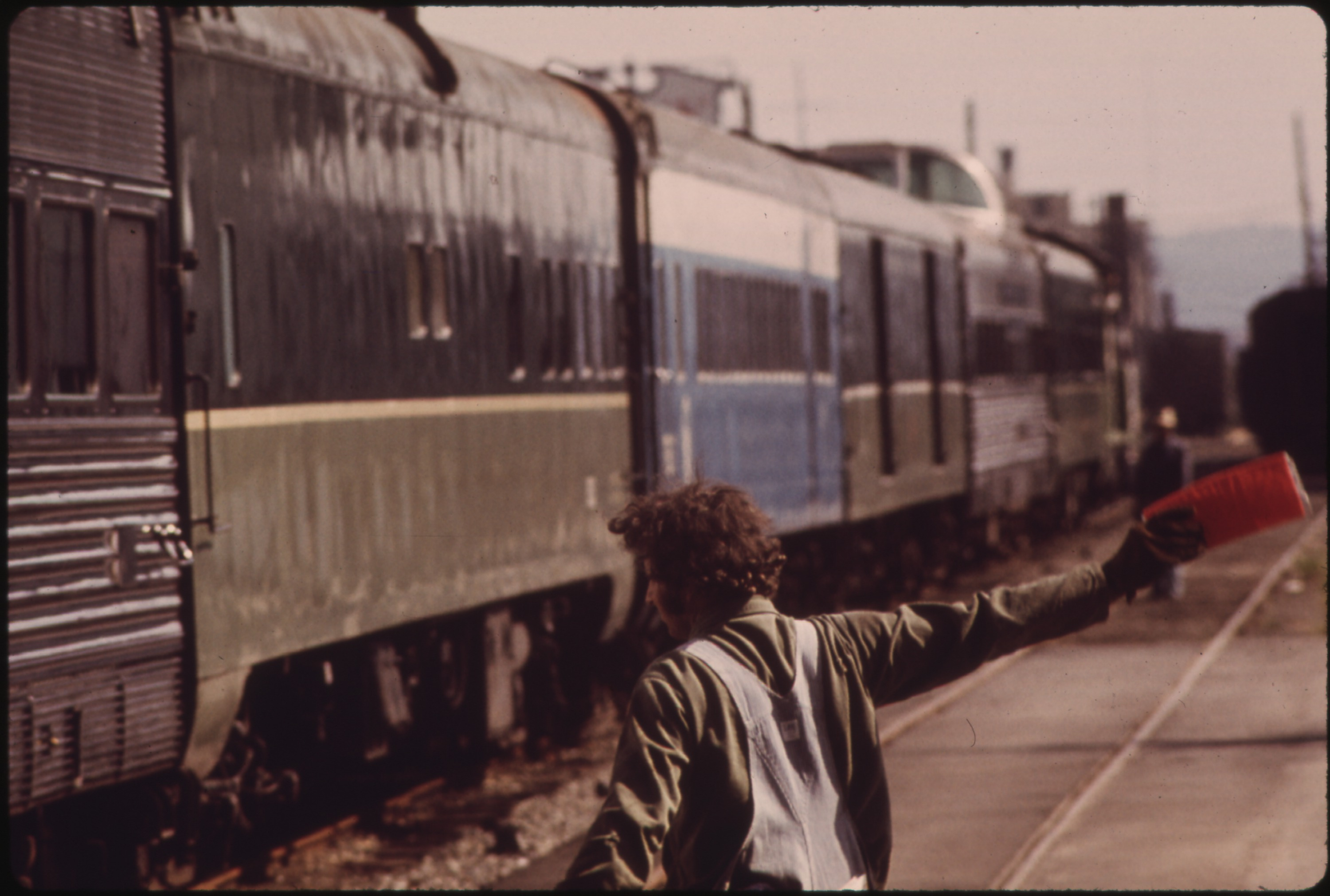
The Mount Rainier in 1974. Note the dome car and coaches still bearing pre-Burlington Northern liveries.

=== Prior service ===
Passenger train service between Seattle and Portland—the core of what became the Cascades corridor—was operated as a joint partnership by the Northern Pacific, Great Northern, and Union Pacific from 1925 to 1970, with the three railroads cross-honoring tickets on their Seattle-Portland routes. When Great Northern and Northern Pacific were folded into the Burlington Northern in 1970, the reconfigured partnership continued to operate the Seattle-Portland service until the creation of Amtrak in 1971. Service between Vancouver, British Columbia, and Seattle was provided via the Great Northern / Burlington Northern International, and between Portland and Eugene by Southern Pacific.

=== Amtrak era ===
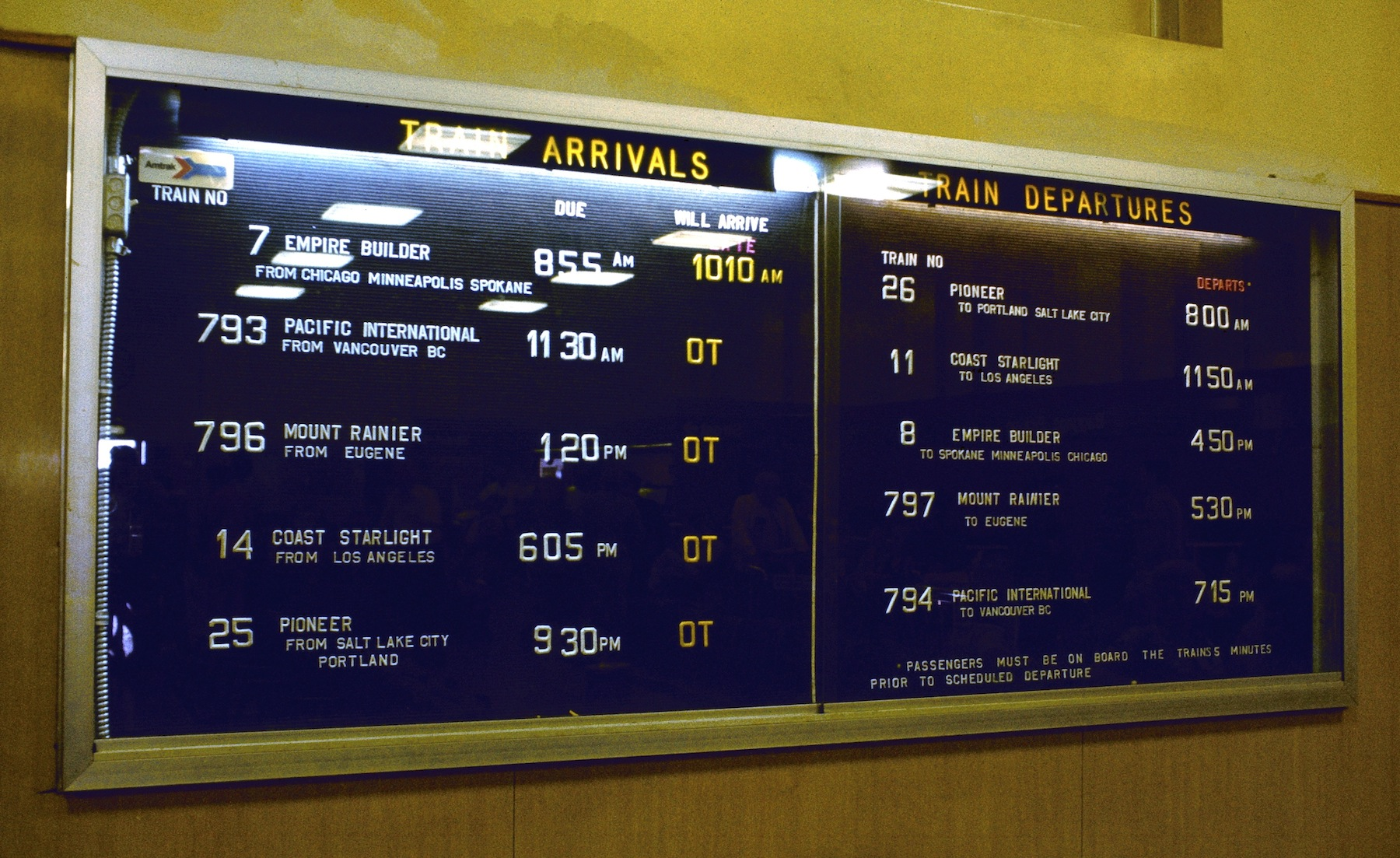
Departure board at Seattle's King Street Station in 1981, listing the Mount Rainier, the Pacific International, and other since-discontinued trains

Amtrak took over intercity passenger rail operations from the private railroads on May 1, 1971. Initial service on the Seattle–Portland portion of the corridor consisted of three daily round trips–one long-distance train running all the way to San Diego, along with two corridor trains inherited from Burlington Northern. There was no corridor service south to Eugene, and no service to the Canadian border at all. The trains were unnamed until November 1971, when the two corridor trains were named the Mount Rainier and Puget Sound and the long-distance train became the Coast Starlight.

Passenger rail service to Vancouver, British Columbia, was restarted on July 17, 1972, with the inauguration of the Seattle–Vancouver Pacific International, which operated with a dome car (unusual for short runs). The train was Amtrak's first international service.

The next major change to service in the corridor came on June 7, 1977, when Amtrak introduced the long-distance Pioneer between Seattle, Portland and Salt Lake City, Utah. To maintain the same level of service between Seattle and Portland, the Puget Sound was eliminated, and the schedule of the Mount Rainier was shifted.

The corridor expanded south of Portland to Eugene on August 3, 1980, with the addition of the Willamette Valley, which operated with two daily round trips, financially subsidized by the State of Oregon. The Pacific International and Willamette Valley struggled to attract riders and were discontinued in September 1981 and December 1981, respectively.

This left three trains on the Seattle–Portland corridor: the regional Mount Rainier and the long-distance Pioneer and Coast Starlight. This level of service would remain unchanged for 13 years.

=== Expansion in the 1990s ===
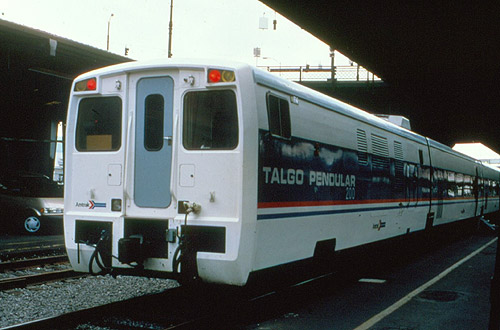
The Northwest Talgo at Portland in August 1994

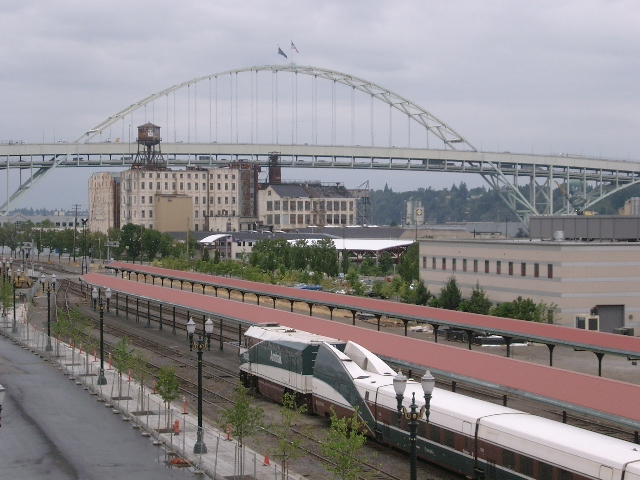
Amtrak Cascades consist in Portland, Oregon, with NPCU at the head of the train.

In 1994, Amtrak began a six-month trial run of modern Talgo equipment over the Seattle–Portland corridor. Amtrak named this service Northwest Talgo, and announced that it would institute a second, conventional train on the corridor (supplementing the Mount Rainier) once the trial concluded. Regular service began on April 1, 1994.

Looking toward the future, Amtrak did an exhibition trip from Vancouver through to Eugene. Amtrak replaced the Northwest Talgo with the Mount Adams on October 30. At the same time, the state of Oregon and Amtrak agreed to extend the Mount Rainier to Eugene through June 1995, with Oregon paying two-thirds of the $1.5 million subsidy.

Service to Canada returned on May 26, 1995, when the Mount Baker International began running between Vancouver and Seattle. The state of Washington leased Talgo equipment similar to the demonstrator from 1994. The Mount Rainier was renamed the Cascadia in October 1995; the new name reflected the joint Oregon–Washington operations of the train. A temporary commuter rail service using Amtrak trains was deployed in September 1997 between Union Station in Portland and Vancouver station during a full closure of the Interstate Bridge for repairs. The free trains had ten round trips and drew an average of 1,335 passengers per day; the low ridership was attributed to the isolated location of Vancouver's station.

A third Seattle–Portland corridor train began in the spring of 1998 with leased Talgo equipment, replacing the discontinued long-distance Pioneer. The other Seattle–Portland/Eugene trains began using Talgo trainsets as well, while the Seattle-Vancouver train used conventional equipment. In preparation for the Vancouver route receiving Talgo equipment as well, Amtrak introduced the temporary Pacific Northwest brand for all four trains, dropping individual names, effective with the spring 1998 timetable.

=== Amtrak Cascades ===
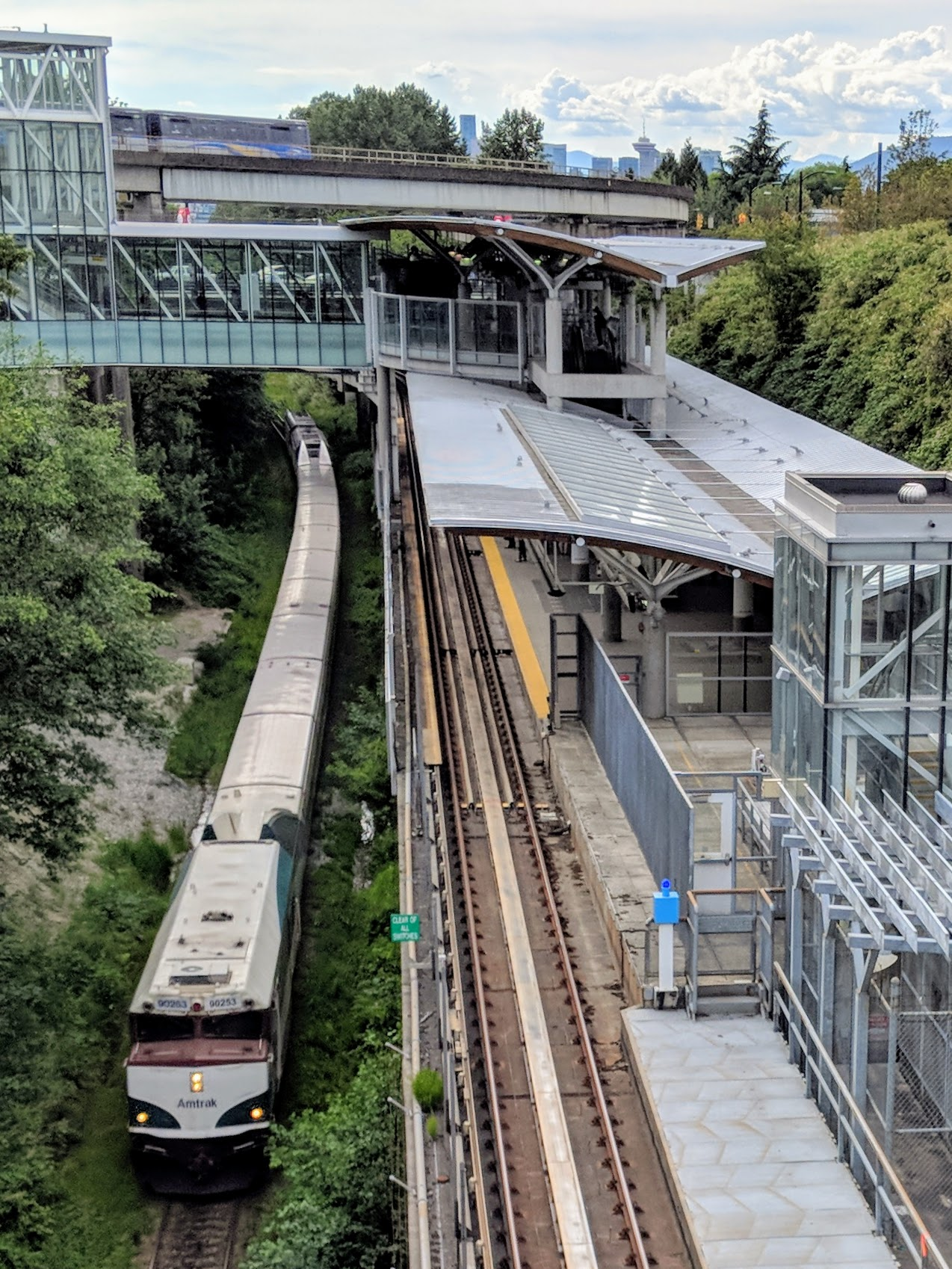
Amtrak Cascades travels by Commercial–Broadway station in Vancouver, British Columbia

Amtrak announced the new Amtrak Cascades brand in the fall 1998 timetable; the new equipment began operation in December. The full Cascades brand was rolled out on January 12, 1999, following a six-week delay due to an issue with the seat designs on the Talgo trainsets. Amtrak extended a second train to Eugene in late 2000.

From the mid-1990s to the May 12, 2008, Amtrak system timetable, full service dining was available on trains going north out of Seattle's King Street Station to Vancouver. The southern trains to Portland briefly had full dining services until the May 16, 1999, system timetable.

In 2004, the Rail Plus program began, allowing cross-ticketing between Sound Transit's Sounder commuter rail and Amtrak between Seattle and Everett on some Cascades trains.

The corridor continued to grow, with another Portland–Seattle train arriving in 2006, and the long-awaited through service between Vancouver, British Columbia, and Portland, eliminating the need to transfer in Seattle, beginning on August 19, 2009 as a pilot project to determine whether a train permanently operating on the route would be feasible. With the Canadian federal government requesting Amtrak to pay for border control costs for the second daily train, the train was scheduled to be discontinued on October 31, 2010. However, Washington State and Canadian officials held discussions in an attempt to continue the service, which resulted in the Canadian government permanently waiving the fee.

Two additional round trips between Seattle and Portland were added on December 18, 2017; an early morning departure from each city and a late evening return, enabling same-day business travel between the two cities. On the first day of service of the new timetable, a train derailed outside of DuPont, Washington, south of Tacoma. Service resumed using the old timetable without the additional round trips.

=== Pandemic cuts and restoration ===
In March 2020, Amtrak Cascades service north of Seattle was suspended indefinitely after all non-essential travel across the Canada–United States border was restricted in response to the COVID-19 pandemic. Amtrak crews ran practice trips between Seattle and Vancouver, British Columbia, in February 2022, and service between those two cities resumed on September 26, 2022. The round trip between Portland and Vancouver resumed on March 7, 2023, restoring the second Seattle–Vancouver trip that existed prior to the COVID-19 pandemic. Seattle–Portland service expanded to six round trips on December 11, 2023, adding the two additional round trips between Seattle and Portland originally intended to start in 2017.

A new customs inspection area at Vancouver's Pacific Central Station with a border preclearance facility was completed in June 2026. It allows Cascades trains to eliminate a secondary inspection stop in Blaine that was performed by U.S. Customs and Border Protection officers. It is North America's first passenger rail preclearance facility and is expected to save 15 minutes on southbound trips. An expanded maintenance facility at the Seattle Yard opened in October 2026 to support operation of the longer Airo trainset. It has 100,000 square feet (9,300 m^{2}) of interior space.

== Route ==
Amtrak Cascades route map

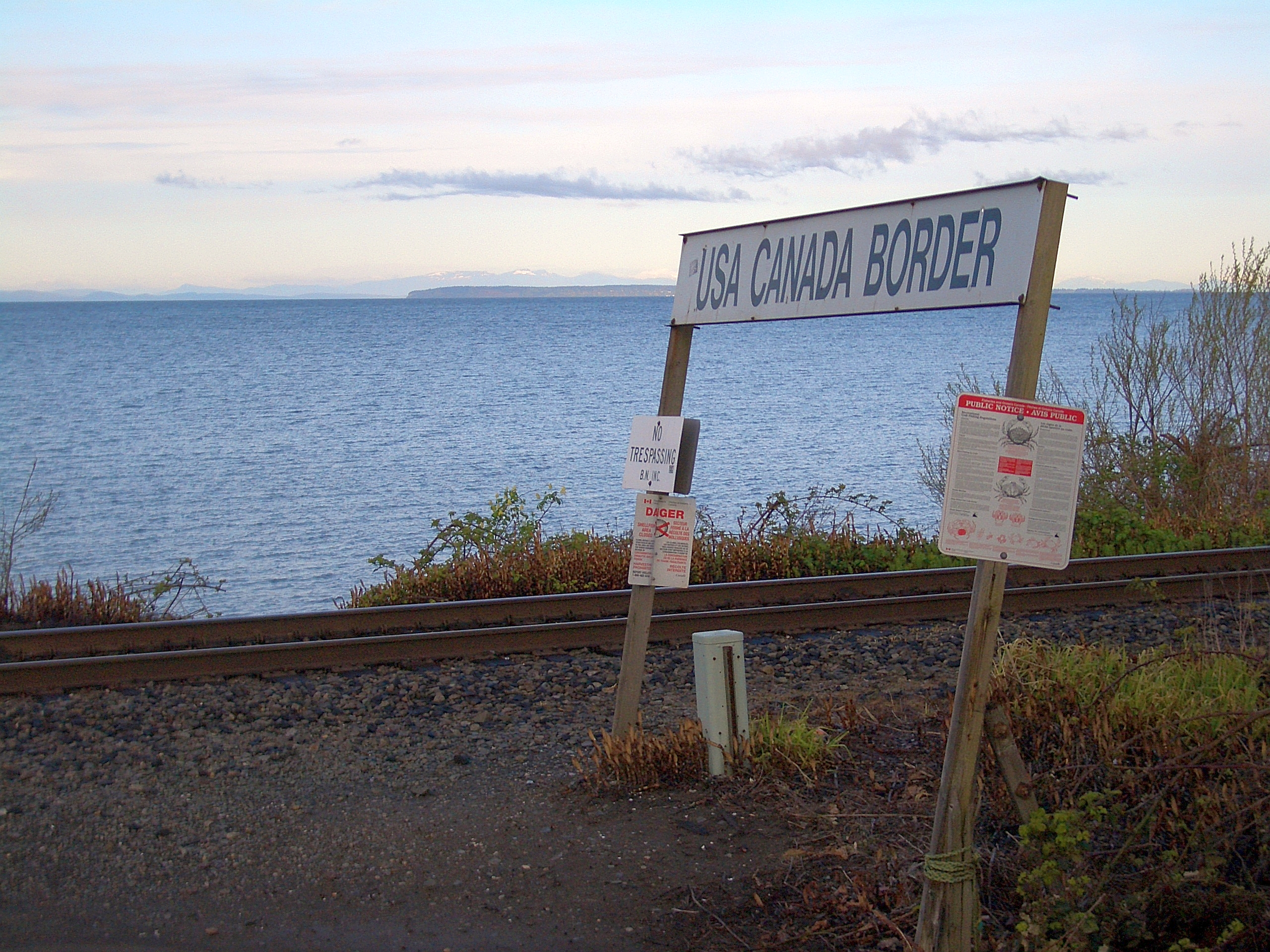
A sign at the point where the railroad crosses the Canada–United States border at Peace Arch Park. This is the westernmost point on the continuous main section of the border. (Point Roberts and Alaska form more westerly sections). Semiahmoo Bay, and beyond it Point Roberts, are in the background.

=== Stations and connections ===
Amtrak Cascades stations
State/Province	City	Station	Connections
British Columbia	Vancouver	Pacific Central Station	Via Rail: The Canadian; Amtrak Thruway; Greyhound Lines; : BC Ferries Connector, Ebus, FlixBus, Rider Express Transportation; Expo Line; TransLink: 3, 8, 19, 22, 23
Washington	Bellingham	Fairhaven Station	Greyhound Lines; Whatcom Transportation Authority
Washington	Mount Vernon	Skagit Station	Greyhound Lines; Local Bus: Skagit Transit, Whatcom Transportation Authority, Island Transit
Washington	Stanwood	Stanwood	Local Bus: Community Transit, Island Transit
Washington	Everett	Everett	Amtrak: Empire Builder; Amtrak Thruway; Sounder: N Line; Greyhound Lines; Northwestern Trailways; ST Express; Local Bus: Community Transit, Everett Transit, Skagit Transit, Island Transit
Washington	Edmonds	Edmonds	Amtrak: Empire Builder; Amtrak Thruway; Sounder: N Line; Edmonds-Kingston Ferry; Northwestern Trailways, Travel Washington; Community Transit
Washington	Seattle	King Street Station	Amtrak: Coast Starlight, Empire Builder; Amtrak Thruway; Sounder: N Line, S Line; Link Light Rail: First Hill Streetcar; ST Express, Travel Washington; Local Bus: Community Transit, King County Metro
Washington	Tukwila	Tukwila	Sounder: S Line; King County Metro
Washington	Tacoma	Tacoma Dome Station	Amtrak: Coast Starlight; Sounder: S Line; Link Light Rail: Greyhound Lines; ST Express; Local bus: Intercity Transit, Pierce Transit
Washington	Olympia/Lacey	Centennial Station	Amtrak: Coast Starlight; Intercity Transit
Washington	Centralia	Centralia	Amtrak: Coast Starlight; Lewis County Transit
Washington	Kelso/Longview	Kelso/Longview	Amtrak: Coast Starlight; Greyhound Lines; RiverCities Transit
Washington	Vancouver, WA	Vancouver, WA	Amtrak: Coast Starlight, Empire Builder
Oregon	Portland	Portland Union Station	Amtrak: Coast Starlight, Empire Builder; MAX Light Rail: Orange Line, Yellow Line, Green Line; Portland Streetcar; : The Bus, Central Oregon Breeze, FlixBus, Pacific Crest Lines, POINT, Shuttle Oregon, The Wave; Trimet Bus
Oregon	Oregon City	Oregon City	
Oregon	Salem	Salem	Amtrak: Coast Starlight; Greyhound Lines; : POINT, Shuttle Oregon, The Wave; Cherriots
Oregon	Albany	Albany	Amtrak: Coast Starlight; POINT; Local Bus: Albany Transit System, Benton Area Transit, Linn-Benton Loop, Linn Shuttle
Oregon	Eugene	Eugene–Springfield	Amtrak: Coast Starlight; : POINT, Pacific Crest Bus Lines; Local Bus: Lane Transit District, Link Lane

== Operations ==
The Cascades primarily uses freight tracks that are owned by BNSF Railway in Washington and British Columbia, and the Union Pacific Railroad in Oregon. In British Columbia, Canadian National Railway operates the tracks between the Vancouver terminus and the New Westminster Bridge for BNSF, and it operates the bridge itself for the Canadian federal government. Sound Transit owns a short section of tracks in Washington on the Point Defiance Bypass. In fiscal year 2023, the trains had an on-time percentage of 64 percent, among the worst rates for state-supported Amtrak routes.

== Ridership ==
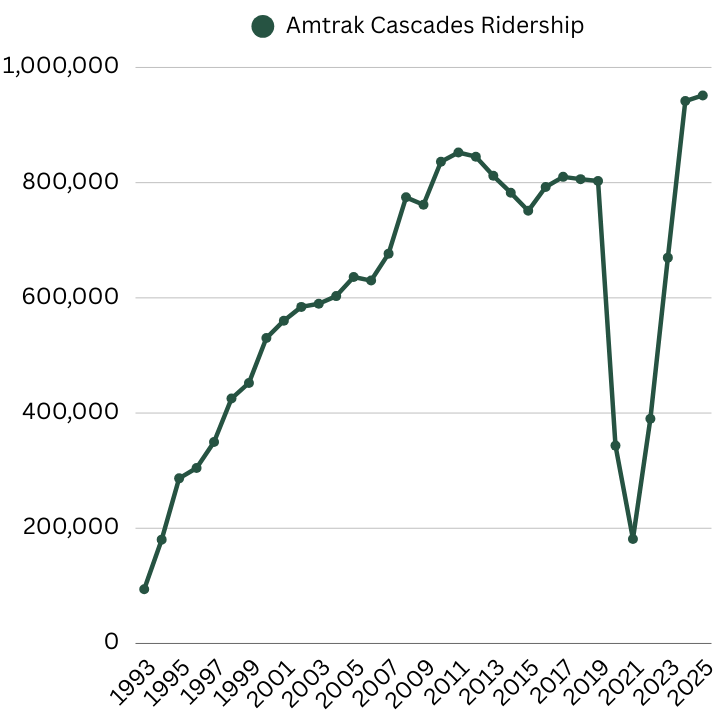
Amtrak Cascades ridership 1993-2025.

Total ridership for 2008 was 774,421, the highest annual ridership since inception of the service in 1993. Ridership declined in 2009 to 740,154 but rose 13% in fiscal year 2010 to 836,499 riders, and to 847,709 riders in 2011.

Ridership declined steadily between 2011 and 2015, attributed in part to competition from low-cost bus carrier BoltBus, which opened a non-stop Seattle–Portland route in May 2012. Low gasoline prices and schedule changes due to track construction also contributed to the decline. Ridership rose again in 2016, and was expected to continue rising in 2017 and beyond, after the completion of the Point Defiance Bypass construction project. However, ridership declined again following the 2017 Washington train derailment, and the COVID-19 pandemic drastically reduced ridership numbers throughout the entire Amtrak network in 2020.

Ridership on the Cascades corridor reached a record high of over 941,000 passengers in 2024, a 41 percent increase from 2023. The record was broken in 2025 with 951,397 passengers, a 1.4% year-over-year increase.

Ridership by year
Year	Ridership	YoY Diff.	YoY Diff. %
2025	951,397	+12 958	▲1.4%
2024	941,727	+271,905	▲40.6%
2023	669,820	+279,572	▲71.6%
2022	390,248	+208,748	▲115.0%
2021	181,500	-161,997	▼47.2%
2020	343,497	-459,398	▼57.2%
2019	802,895	-3,226	▼0.4%
2018	806,121	-3,929	▼0.5%
2017	810,050	+17,569	▲2.2%
2016	792,481	+41,333	▲5.5%
2015	751,148	-31,371	▼4.0%
2014	782,519	-29,443	▼3.6%
2013	811,962	-33,137	▼3.9%
2012	845,099	-7,170	▼0.8%
2011	852,269	+15,970	▲1.9%
2010	836,299	+74,689	▲9.8%
2009	761,610	-12,921	▼1.7%
2008	774,531	+97,766	▲14.4%
2007	676,765	+46,769	▲7.4%
2006	629,996	-6,096	▼1.0%
2005	636,092	+33,033	▲5.5%
2004	603,059	+13,316	▲2.3%
2003	589,743	+5,397	▲0.1%
2002	584,346	+23,965	▲4.3%
2001	560,381	+30,163	▲5.7%
2000	530,218	+77,884	▲17.2%
1999	452,334	+27,196	▲6.4%
1998	425,138	+75,377	▲21.6%
1997	349,761	+45,195	▲14.8%
1996	304,566	+17,910	▲6.2%
1995	286,656	+106,447	▲59.1%
1994	180,209	+86,148	▲91.6%
1993	94,061	—	—

== Rolling stock ==
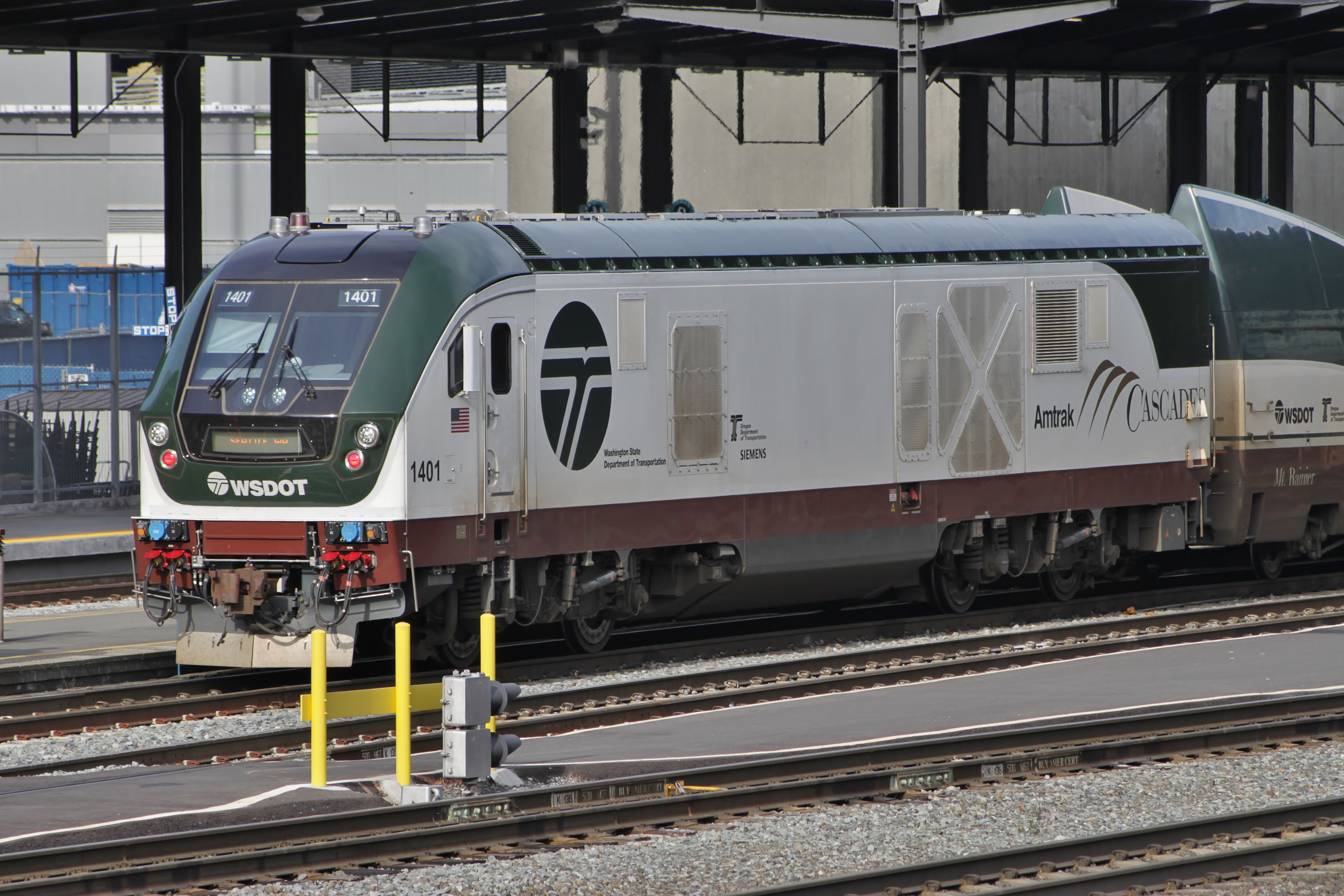
Brand new Siemens Charger SC-44 locomotive in February 2018

As of 2026, service on the Cascades route is provided using equipment from Amtrak's national fleet, along with two articulated trainsets manufactured by Talgo and two Amtrak Airo trainsets manufactured by Siemens.

In early 2014, the Washington State Department of Transportation (WSDOT), awarded a contract to Siemens USA to manufacture 8 new Siemens Charger SC-44 locomotives for the Cascades. The order was part of a larger joint purchase between Illinois, California, Michigan, and Missouri. These locomotives were delivered to WSDOT in Summer 2017 and went into service in late 2017. The additional locomotives were to have enabled two additional runs to be added as part of the Point Defiance Bypass project (the additional service was suspended and its recommencement has not been announced) and will replace the six EMD F59PHI locomotives leased from Amtrak; these were sold to Metra in early 2018. One SC-44 locomotive was destroyed in the December 18, 2017, derailment on the Point Defiance Cutoff, but was soon replaced by a newly built Charger by Siemens (1408) in August 2020. In the wake of the accident, Amtrak proposed to lease or buy two Talgo trainsets which were originally bought for use in Wisconsin but never operated.

=== Talgo Series 8 ===
Talgo Series 8

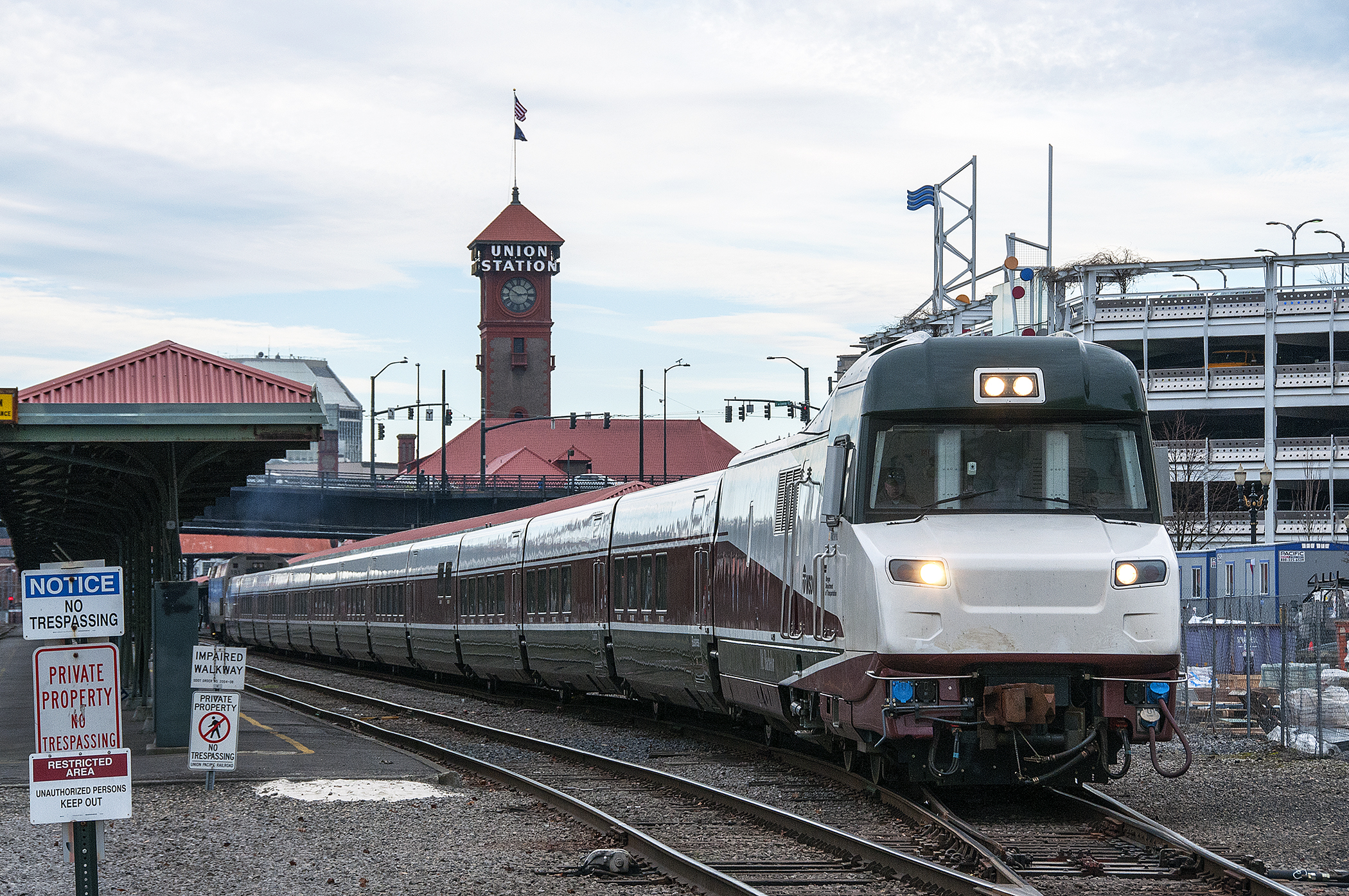
A Talgo Series 8 trainset departs Portland Union Station with the cab car leading.

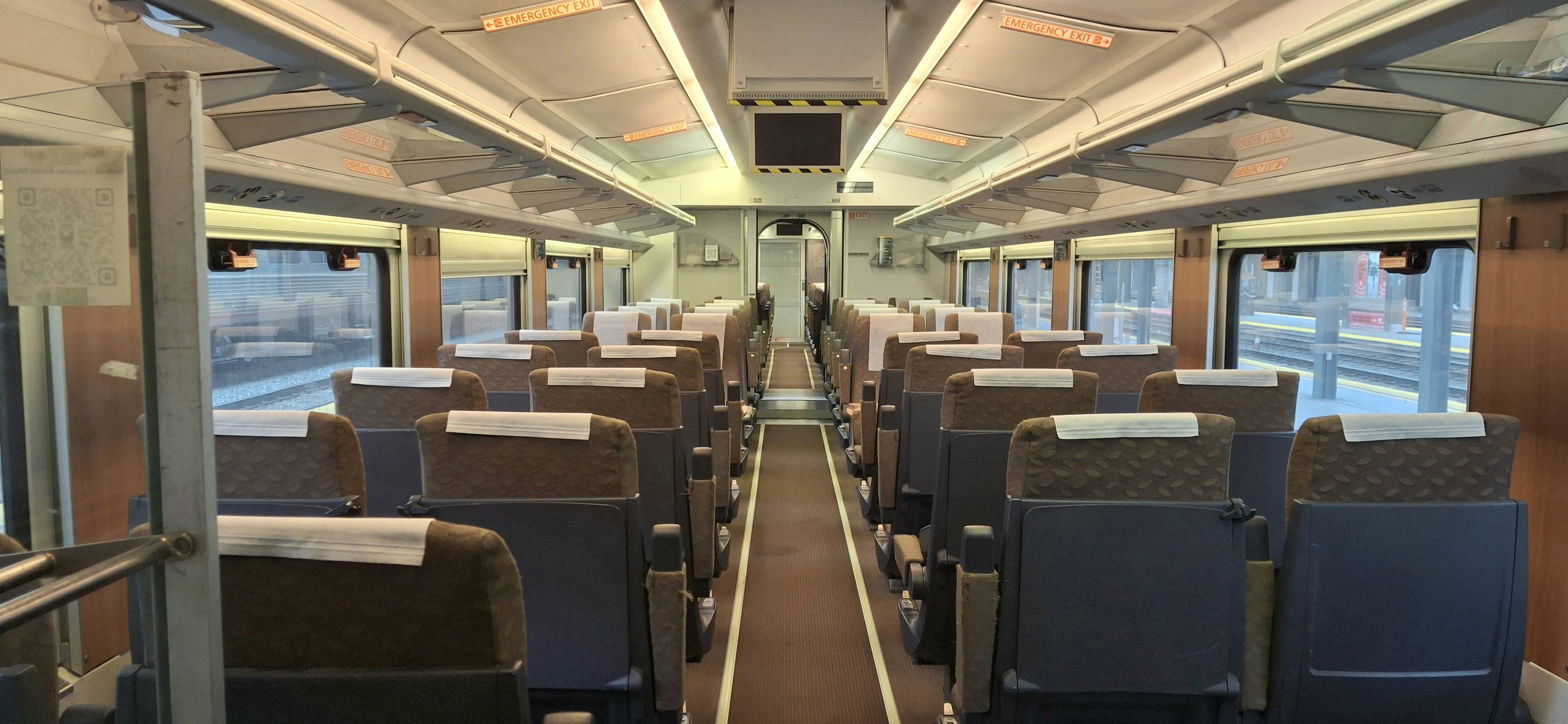
Coach class interior on a Talgo Series 8 trainset

The two Talgo Series 8 trainsets were built in 2013 through a purchase from the Oregon Department of Transportation (ODOT) to enable further service expansion. The trainsets are named Mount Bachelor and Mount Jefferson. The cars are designed to passively tilt into curves, allowing the train to pass through them at higher speeds than a conventional train. The tilting technology reduces travel time between Seattle and Portland by 25 minutes. Track and safety requirements limit the train's speed to 79 miles per hour (127 km/h), although the Talgo trainsets are designed for a maximum design speed of 124 miles per hour (200 km/h).

A typical Talgo trainset consists of 13 cars: one baggage car; two "business class" coaches; one lounge car (also known as the Diner car); one cafe car (also known as the Bistro car); seven "coach class" coaches; and one combination cab/power car (which houses a driver's cab, a head-end power generator and other equipment). Trainsets are typically paired with a Siemens Charger locomotive painted in a matching paint scheme. Additionally, trainsets without a cab car are paired with a Non-Powered Control Unit (NPCU), an older locomotive with no engine, that is also painted in a matching paint scheme and is used as a cab car.

The Cascades equipment is painted in a special paint scheme consisting of colors the agency calls Evergreen (dark green), Castilian Copper (brown), Nugget (tan) and Double Latte (cream). The trainsets are named after mountain peaks in the Pacific Northwest (many in the Cascade Range). The four original Series VI trainsets were named after Mount Baker, Mount Hood, Mount Olympus, and Mount Rainier. The Series VI trainset built to operate between Las Vegas and Los Angeles (painted in Surfliner colors) was renamed the Mount Adams when it was purchased by the state of Washington. This trainset was subsequently destroyed in the December 18, 2017, derailment on the Point Defiance Cutoff.

=== Airo ===
Amtrak Airo

An Amtrak Airo test train in July 2026, pushed by an ALC-42E locomotive

Coach class interior on an Airo trainset

In August 2019, the Federal Railroad Administration awarded WSDOT up to $37.5 million to purchase three new trainsets for the route, allowing the replacement of the older Talgo VI trainsets. In July 2021, Amtrak and Siemens Mobility announced an order for new Siemens Venture coaches and Charger locomotives for Cascades service as part of a $7.3 billion national railcar procurement. The equipment was branded Amtrak Airo in December 2022.

The Airo fleet for Cascades will consist of eight trainsets, each with a capacity of approximately 300 passengers in six cars, far more than the Talgo trainsets. The first car, adjacent to the locomotive, will have 1+2 business-class seating. The second car will have coach seating, a café, and a conductor's office. Cars 3 through 5 will have 2+2 coach seating, while the sixth car will be the cab car with coach seating and checked-baggage storage. The Siemens order included a spare cab car along with three new ALC-42E Charger locomotives, which will be used alongside the Cascades existing fleet of eight SC-44 Charger locomotives. The eight trainsets are expected to cost the Washington State Department of Transportation (WSDOT) approximately $150 million. Of this amount, $75 million had been secured as of July 2021, with additional funding expected from the federal government and potentially from the governments of Oregon and British Columbia. The trainsets use a Cascades-specific livery featuring Mount Rainier and Mount Hood, with green as the primary color and brown and white accents.

Seven trainsets had been delivered by August 2026. Two Airo trainsets entered Cascades service on September 30, 2026, operating four daily trips. Additional trainsets will enter service as they are delivered, eventually replacing the existing Cascades fleet, as well as freeing up Amfleet coaches for other Amtrak intercity routes.

=== Former equipment ===
The Cascades service started in 1998 with four Talgo Series VI trainsets; two were owned by the Washington State Department of Transportation (WSDOT) and two were owned by Amtrak. Each trainset was built with 12 cars and a six-car spare set, including a baggage car, service car, lounge car, café car and two "coach class" coaches, was also built. The Series VI had 7-foot-tall (2.1 m) tail fins at both ends of the train that serve as an aesthetic transition from the low-profile trainsets and the larger locomotives. The trainsets could hold 304 passengers in 12 cars.

In 1998, Amtrak also purchased an additional Series VI trainset as a demonstrator for potential service between Los Angeles and Las Vegas. This trainset was built with two additional "coach class" coaches, for a total of 14 cars. The demonstration route was not funded and WSDOT purchased the trainset in 2004 to expand service. The purchase also allowed Amtrak and WSDOT to redistribute the "coach class" coaches. By using the two additional coaches from this new trainset and placing the two coaches from the spare set into regular service, the agencies were able to create four 13-car trains and one 12-car train.

The five Talgo Series VI trainsets were retired from service in June 2020. They were primarily replaced by the two Talgo Series 8 trainsets, which lack the distinctive tail fins and have minor differences in the interior layout. The last two remaining Talgo VI trainsets were hauled to a scrapper on February 28, 2021. One Series VI Bistro car, No. 7304, was later acquired by the Northwest Railway Museum in 2023.

As a temporary replacement for the Talgo Series VI, Horizon cars were used alongside the existing Talgo Series 8 sets until new cars entered the fleet. Amtrak's entire Horizon fleet was removed from service on March 26, 2025, due to corrosion issues, leaving only a single Talgo trainset left to serve the Cascades route. A second Talgo trainset had been damaged by a tree during an extratropical cyclone in November 2024. Most scheduled Cascades trains were temporarily replaced with shuttle buses, including all service to Canada. Some rail trips began to be restored in April 2025, with reduced capacity, after Amfleet cars arrived to replace the Horizons. All trips were restored on April 6.

== Funding ==
Funding for the route is provided separately by the states of Oregon and Washington, with Union Station in Portland serving as the dividing point between the two. As of December 2023, the Washington state government funds six daily round trips between Seattle and Portland and two daily round trips between Seattle and Vancouver, British Columbia. Oregon funds two daily round trips between Eugene and Portland. The seven trainsets are organized into semi-regular operating cycles, but no particular train always has one route.

=== Local partnerships ===
As a result of Cascades service being jointly funded by the Washington and Oregon departments of transportation, public transit agencies and local municipalities can offer a variety of discounts, including companion ticket coupons.

- FlexPass and University of Washington UPass holders receive a 15% discount (discount code varies) on all regular Cascades travel. Employers participating in these programs may also receive a limited number of free companion ticket coupons for distribution to employees.
- The Sound Transit RailPlus program allows riders to use weekday Cascades trains between Everett and Seattle with the Sounder commuter rail fare structure.
- Starting in 2024, trips within Washington state are free for riders under the age of 19; riders under 16 must be accompanied by an adult to be eligible.

The Cascades service also benefits from Sound Transit's track upgrades for Sounder service, notably the Point Defiance Bypass project.

== Related services ==
The Cascades corridor is also served by Amtrak Thruway buses that are partially funded by the Washington state government and contracted out to MTRWestern. Amtrak introduced its first battery electric bus on the Cascades service in August 2023.

== Proposed changes ==
According to its long-range plan published in 2006, the WSDOT Rail Office plans eventual service of 13 daily round trips between Seattle and Portland and 4–6 round trips between Seattle and Bellingham, with four of those extending to Vancouver, British Columbia. Amtrak Cascades travels along the entirety of the proposed Pacific Northwest High Speed Rail Corridor; the incremental improvements are designed to result in eventual higher-speed service. According to WSDOT, the "hundreds of curves" in the current route and "the cost of acquiring land and constructing a brand new route" make upgrades so cost-prohibitive that, at most, speeds of 110 mph (177 km/h) can be achieved.

The eventual high-speed rail service according to the long-range plan should result in the following travel times:

- Seattle to Portland – 3:30 (2006); 3:25 (after completion of Point Defiance Bypass); 2:30 (planned)
- Seattle to Vancouver, British Columbia – 3:55 (2006); 2:45 (planned)
- Vancouver, British Columbia, to Portland – 7:55 (2009); 5:25 (planned)

In order to increase train speeds and frequency to meet these goals, a number of incremental track improvement projects must be completed. Gates and signals must be improved, some grade crossings must be separated, track must be replaced or upgraded, and station capacities must be increased. The existing Columbia River Railroad Bridge between Vancouver, Washington and Portland would have to be modified, and an additional railroad bridge would have to be built next to the existing bridge.

Building upon previous studies, the long-range plan also proposed relocating the northern terminus from Vancouver's Pacific Central Station southeast to a "Greater Vancouver Terminal" near SkyTrain's existing Scott Road station in Surrey, British Columbia. In this scenario, northbound passengers would then ride the SkyTrain rapid transit system for about a half-hour to complete a trip to downtown Vancouver. The plan cited several motivations for terminus relocation, including: congestion at and near the New Westminster Bridge, which is a single-track railway subject to very low train speed limits and numerous bridge openings for marine traffic; lower-than-desired speed limits due to poor geological soil conditions underneath the BNSF track between the bridge and Pacific Central Station; bottlenecks at Canadian National Railway's Second Narrows Rail Bridge and Thornton Tunnel that cause northbound freight trains headed to the North Shore of the Burrard Inlet to back up onto and obstruct the BNSF main line; and repeated opposition to passenger service expansion from Canadian National Railway.

In order to extend the second daily Seattle to Bellingham round trip to Vancouver, BNSF was required to make track improvements in Canada, to which the government of British Columbia was asked to contribute financially. On March 1, 2007, an agreement between the province, Amtrak, and BNSF was reached, allowing a second daily train to and from Vancouver. The project involved building an 11,000-foot (3.4 km) siding in Delta, British Columbia, at a cost of US$7 million; construction started in 2007 and has been completed.

In December 2008, WSDOT published a mid-range plan detailing projects needed to achieve the midpoint level of service proposed in the long-range plan.

In 2009, Oregon applied for a $2.1 billion Federal grant to redevelop the unused Oregon Electric Railway tracks, parallel to the Cascades' route between Eugene and Portland. But it did not receive the grant. Instead, analysis of alternative routes to enable more passenger trains and higher speeds proceeded. In 2015, the current route, with numerous upgrades, was chosen by the Project Team as the Recommended Preferred Alternative. The Preferred Alternative, if built, would decrease the trip time by 15 minutes from 2 hours and 35 minutes to 2 hours and 20 minutes and increase the number of daily trains from 2 to 6 from Eugene to Portland.

In 2013, travel times between Seattle and Portland remained the same as they had been in 1966, with the fastest trains making the journey in 3 hours 30 minutes. WSDOT received more than $800 million in high-speed rail stimulus funds for projects discussed in the mid-range plan, since the corridor is one of the approved high-speed corridors eligible for money from ARRA. The deadline for spending the stimulus funds is September 2017. The schedule was for the Leadership Council to vote on this in December 2015, then a Draft Tier 1 Environmental Impact Statement was to be released in 2016 and hearings held on it, for the Leadership Council to finalize the Recommended Selected Alternative in 2017, then publish the Final Tier 1 EIS and receive the Record of Decision in 2018. Then if funds can be found, design and engineering must be done before any construction can begin.

In October 2023, WSDOT made public a summary of its preliminary service development plan, which offered five conceptual options for future rail service. Three of the options kept the top train speed at 79 mph (127 km/h), while the other two options increased the top speed to 90 mph (145 km/h). The most aggressive frequency option increased the number of round trips between Seattle and Portland to 16 and the number between Vancouver, British Columbia, and Seattle to 6. Four of the options included a rail/bus combination for some round trips between Vancouver and Seattle; the section between Seattle and Bellingham would be served by rail, while the section between Bellingham and Vancouver would be handled by bus. The assumed maximum top speed was reduced from 110 mph (177 km/h) in the 2006 long range plan to 90 mph (145 km/h) in the 2024 preliminary service development plan based on BNSF restrictions.

Various jurisdictions have made attempts to add a stop within the approximately 60-mile (97 km) gap between Vancouver, British Columbia, and Bellingham. The intent was to better serve the growing population in the southern part of the Greater Vancouver region without requiring a backtrack to downtown Vancouver. Infill stations have been proposed on separate occasions at the international border towns of Blaine, Washington, and White Rock, British Columbia, which both had stops on Amtrak's predecessor Pacific International service.

In 2024, a Canadian passenger rail advocacy group recommended that the Canadian government make 10 infrastructure improvements between White Rock and Vancouver at a total estimated cost of CA$127.6 million. These improvements would increase operational performance and reliability, and the resulting reduction in travel time would permit Amtrak to add a Blaine stop.

== Accidents and incidents ==
=== July 2017 derailment ===
On July 2, 2017, northbound train 506 derailed while approaching the Chambers Bay drawbridge southwest of Tacoma, Washington. The train was traveling above the speed limit of 40 miles per hour (64 km/h) after passing an "Approach" signal (indicating that it be prepared to stop short of the next signal) at the bridge. As the bridge was raised and open, a device known as a "de-rail" was engaged, used to prevent a train from proceeding and falling in to the water by derailing it beforehand. The incident root cause was human error due to the engineer losing situational awareness. Only minor injuries were sustained due to the low speed at time of event as the engineer did attempt to stop on seeing the bridge up. The train's consist, an Oregon DOT-owned Talgo VIII set, was returned to the Talgo plant in Milwaukee, Wis. for repairs and returned to service in April 2018.

=== December 2017 derailment ===
On December 18, 2017, while making the inaugural run on the Point Defiance Bypass, southbound train 501 derailed near DuPont, Washington. Three passengers were killed, and 65 people in total were injured. The crash occurred on an overpass over I-5, on a sharp curve with a speed limit of 30 mph (48 km/h); train 501 was traveling at 80 mph (130 km/h). Positive train control (PTC), a system that would have prevented the train from speeding, was not yet enabled on the Point Defiance Bypass at the time of the crash. An investigation by the National Transportation Safety Board also found that the train's engineer was not properly trained on either the tracks or the train's Siemens Charger locomotive, both of which were new at the time.

WSDOT announced that it would not resume service until PTC was fully implemented. Service was then scheduled to restart in early 2019. PTC was activated on the Point Defiance Bypass in March 2019, resulting in full PTC implementation on the US portion of the corridor between Blaine and Eugene. However, Cascades service on the bypass did not resume until November 18, 2021, almost four years after the derailment. Service resumption was not contingent on PTC being used on the British Columbia portion of the corridor, as PTC was not permanently implemented anywhere in Canada until October 2025, when BNSF started running PTC-protected trains along a 17-mile (27 km) stretch of the Cascades corridor between the US border and Brownsville (near the New Westminster Bridge).
