= Tillamook County Transportation District =

- Founded: 1997
- Headquarters: 3600 Third Street, Tillamook
- Locale: Tillamook County, Oregon
- Service type: Bus service, paratransit
- Routes: Five
- Website: nwconnector.org/agencies/tillamook-county-transportation-district/

The Tillamook County Transportation District (TCTD), branded as The Wave, is a provider of local and intercity bus transportation services in Tillamook County, Oregon, United States. The district was created by the county, with borders contiguous with those of the county, though it is organizationally independent.

== Beginnings ==
TCTD was created by the Tillamook County Board of Commissioners in 1997, the transportation district's first board of directors was elected in November 1997, and had its first meeting the following month.

TCTD was created at the request of the county's Transportation Advisory Committee (Friends of the Wave) one year into a transportation demonstration project sponsored by the State of Oregon. The project, nicknamed "The Wave" early on, had been instituted using two borrowed buses to offer limited local bus service within Tillamook County, and limited intercity service to Hillsboro, Beaverton and Portland. Various studies and growing ridership on the new services suggested that a tax-supported bus system might be viable in the coastal county.

Though the transportation district had been established by the county commissioners, it lacked any substantial source of funding beyond that offered by the state for the demonstration project. The newly elected board of directors asked voters to approve a property tax levy of twenty cents per thousand assessed valuation in the spring of 1998. This initial ballot measure failed. The same measure was again put to the voters in November of the same year, however, passing with a margin of over 60% the second time around.

== Growth ==
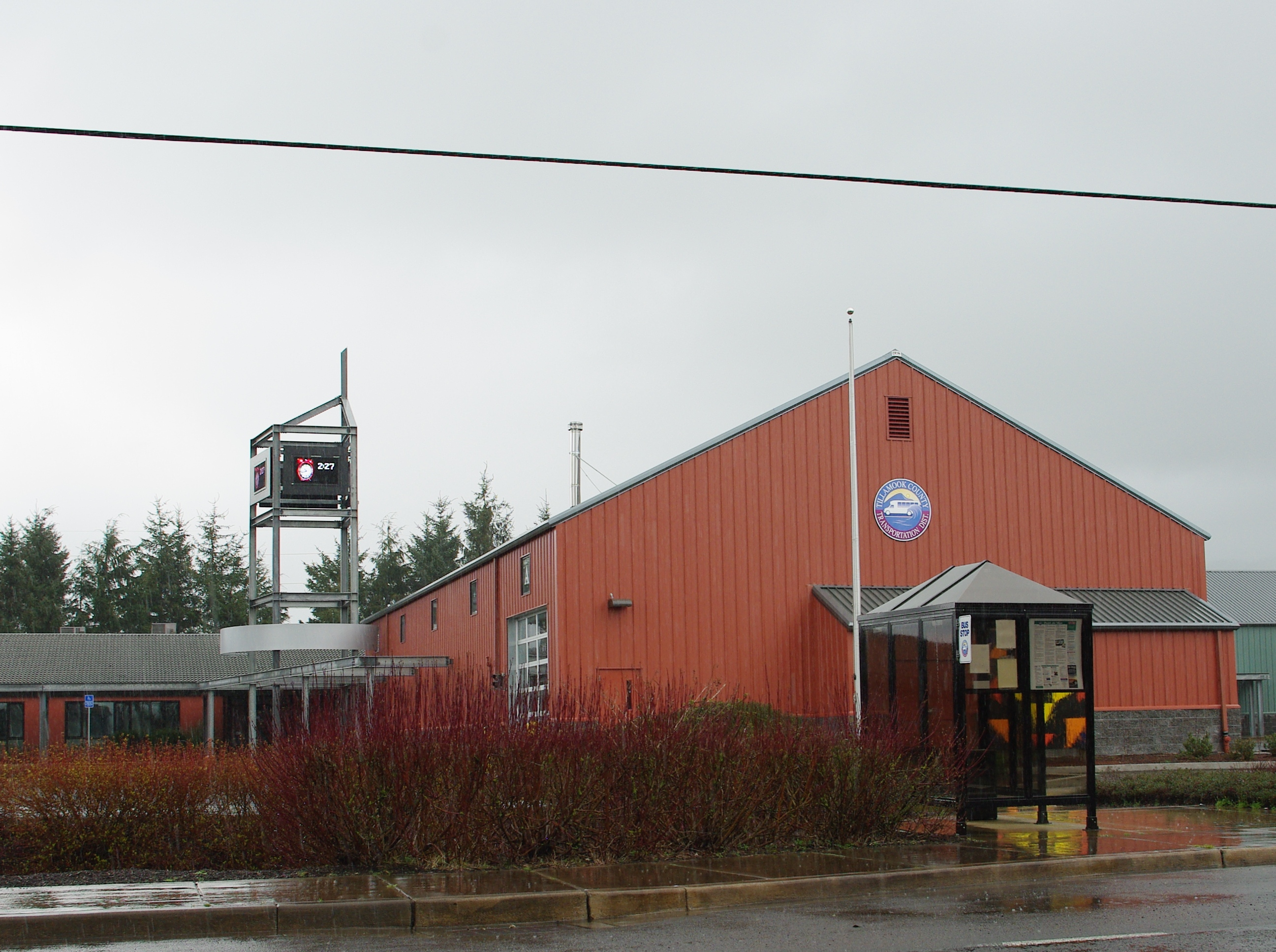
District headquarters

Once a source of funding had been secured through the voter-approved tax levy, TCTD began work to improve its services. In 1999, a new general manager was hired, and improvements were made in the district's route system. The fare system was redesigned and simplified, making travel on the system more economical for its riders. New vehicles were put into service to replace the aging borrowed buses, and service frequencies were improved.

Eventually, service to Portland was streamlined to cut travel times, and connections were improved with TriMet services, Amtrak (at Union Station) and Greyhound Lines to make regional travel more convenient. The changes were greeted with substantial ridership increases, as TCTD provided more and more services to both the north and south portions of Tillamook County, and in the city of Tillamook itself. Dial-A-Ride services, initially provided by volunteer drivers and now supplemented with some paid drivers, made TCTD services available to all areas of the county.

== Current service ==
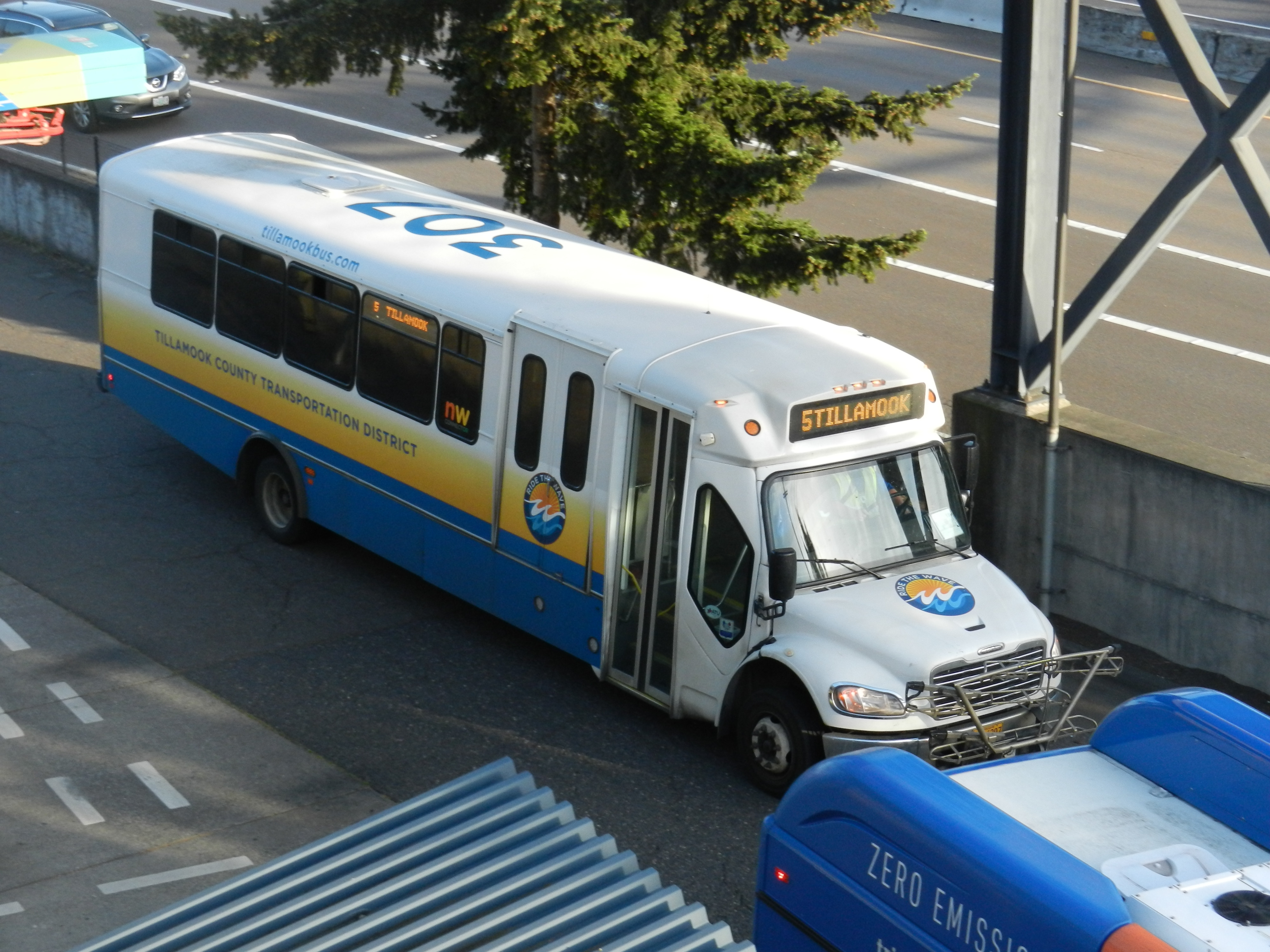
A TCTD bus at Sunset Transit Center

In September 2011, TCTD began providing public transportation services seven days a week (Sunday through Saturday). TCTD also provides Intercity bus services to Portland providing two trips seven days a week. TCTD also operates service north from Tillamook County into Cannon Beach in Clatsop County in cooperation with the Sunset Empire Transportation District. In February 2012, TCTD began providing public transportation service between Tillamook and Lincoln City in cooperation with Lincoln County Transportation Service District.

Route	Route Name	Area Served	Days of Service
1	Tillamook Town Loop	Tillamook	Sunday - Saturday
2	Tillamook - Oceanside / Netarts	Tillamook, Oceanside & Netarts	Sunday - Saturday
3	Tillamook - Manzanita / Cannon Beach	Tillamook, Bay City, Garibaldi, Idaville, Rockaway Beach, Wheeler, Nehalem, Manzanita & Cannon Beach	Sunday - Saturday
4	Tillamook - Pacific City / Lincoln City	Tillamook, Pleasant Valley, Beaver, Hebo, Cloverdale, Pacific City, Neskowin & Lincoln City	Sunday - Saturday
5	Tillamook - Portland	Tillamook, Tillamook Forest Center, Banks; North Plains, Beaverton & Portland	
