= Sunset Empire Transportation District =

Sunset Empire Transportation

- A Sunset Empire bus in Astoria in 2026
- Headquarters: 465 NE Skipanon Drive, Warrenton
- Locale: Clatsop County, Oregon
- Service type: bus service, paratransit
- Alliance: NW Connector
- Routes: 4
- Website: nwconnector.org/agencies/sunset-empire-transportation-district/

The Sunset Empire Transportation District (SETD) provides federally funded rural intercity bus services in Clatsop County, Oregon. Sunset Empire Transportation is also known as 'The Bus'.

SETD also provides transit connections for the National Park Service and the Lewis and Clark National Historical Park, titled the Lewis and Clark Explorer Shuttle, through a $2.5 million Federal Transit Administration grant, and via a SAFETEA-LU Alternative Transportation in Parks and Public Lands grant.

SETD has also received funding through the TEA-21 appropriations act.

== Routes ==
Route	Route Name	Area Served	Days of Service
Route 10	Red Cedar	East Astoria	Monday - Friday
Route 20	Gray Sea Gull	Gearhart, Seaside & Cannon Beach	Monday - Friday
Route 101	Pink Salmon	Astoria, Warrenton, Gearhart & Seaside	Monday - Friday
CONNECTOR Pacific	(No Name)	Astoria, Warrenton, Gearhart, Seaside and Cannon Beach	Saturday and Sunday

In April 2011, all routes except 10 and 101 were eliminated, and Saturday service was canceled, in response to severe budget shortfalls.

A shortage of funding led to a brief suspension of all service in 2023, lasting from April 29 to May 15.

Dial-A-Ride Service is available on Tuesdays and Thursdays to Knappa for a fare of $12
