= Top and tail =

Train with locomotive at both ends

In a typical top-and-tail configuration, locomotives at both ends of the train operate simultaneously under the control of a single driver.

In other configurations, only the leading locomotive is powered, while any additional locomotives are hauled "dead-in-train."

Top-and-tail (or double-ended in North America) is a configuration for trains with two locomotives or power cars at both ends, for ease of changing direction, especially where the terminal station has no run-round loop. In the United Kingdom, it is normal for only the leading locomotive to power the train when in top-and-tail mode.

It should not be confused with a push–pull train, which has a locomotive at one end and an unpowered control car at the other end.

Trains going up zig zags of the Khyber Pass are top-and-tailed, although Pakistan Railways calls this by a different term.

In Japan, the term "push-pull" is confusingly used to describe trains top-and-tailed with a locomotive at either end. (True push-pull operation with a locomotive at one end is not seen on Japanese mainline railways.)

== Australia ==
In New South Wales the XPT is a train with a lightweight locomotive at either end. It is based on the British HST. The locomotive at the front operates at full traction power, while the locomotive at the rear operates at half power, the other half powering lighting and air conditioning, etc. This power arrangement is needed to cater with steep 1 in 40 (2.5%, or 25‰) and 1 in 33 (3%, or 30‰) gradients.

Occasionally a short XPT train operates with only one engine and fewer carriages, in which case the whole train must be turned on a triangle such as at Dubbo.

Top and tail operation is also used for ballast trains which have to move up and down a line undergoing track maintenance. It is safer to drive these trains from the front when operating in "reverse".

== Two locomotives powering ==
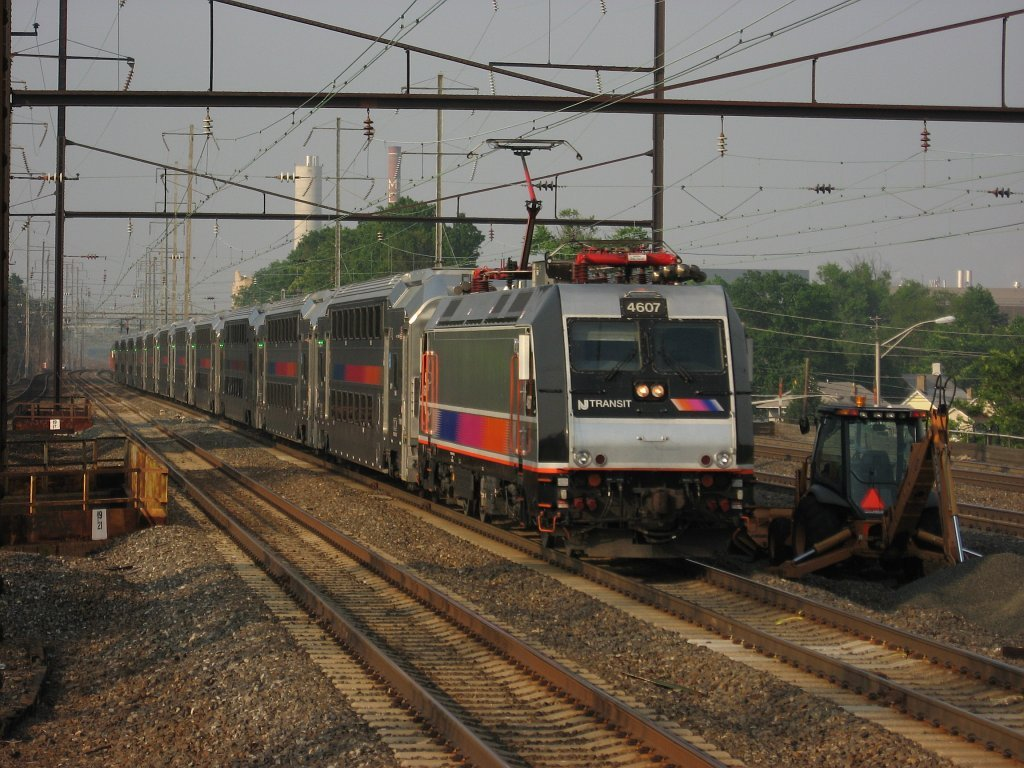
A New Jersey Transit train with Bombardier ALP-46 locomotives on both ends and 11 cars in between, in New Jersey, United States

Alternatively, a top and tail train may also have both locomotives powered, with the rear locomotive pushing and the front locomotive pulling. In this case, caution must be used to make sure that the two locomotives do not put too much stress on the cars from uneven locomotives. It is usual to arrange matters so that the trailing locomotive supplies less power, i.e. that the locomotive at the front does more pulling than the locomotive at the rear does pushing. When this configuration is used in the US, only one locomotive (usually the front locomotive) is allowed to provide head end power (HEP: electricity supply for heating, air conditioning and lighting) to the train. Top and tail trains with two locomotives powered used by the InterCity 125; Brightline; Amtrak's Acela; SNCF's TGV; Taiwan Railways Administration's E1000 series; and New Jersey Transit's longest Northeast Corridor Line multilevel trains.

This form of operation has not necessarily been a function of train length; sometimes it was the most convenient way to set up push–pull operation in pre-HEP days without converting coaches to cab control operation. A prime example of this was the Reading Company which converted its small fleet of streamstyled heavyweight medium-distance coaches for its non-electric commuter operation, with a pair of EMD FP7 diesels bracketing a single five-car train, to supplant the Reading's fleet of RDCs. This train normally operated a weekday peak-hour round trip between Reading Terminal, Philadelphia and Reading, Pennsylvania, from the late 1960s until 1981, with operation in the last five years by Conrail under contract to SEPTA.
