= Willamette Valley (train) =

Train in Oregon (1980s)

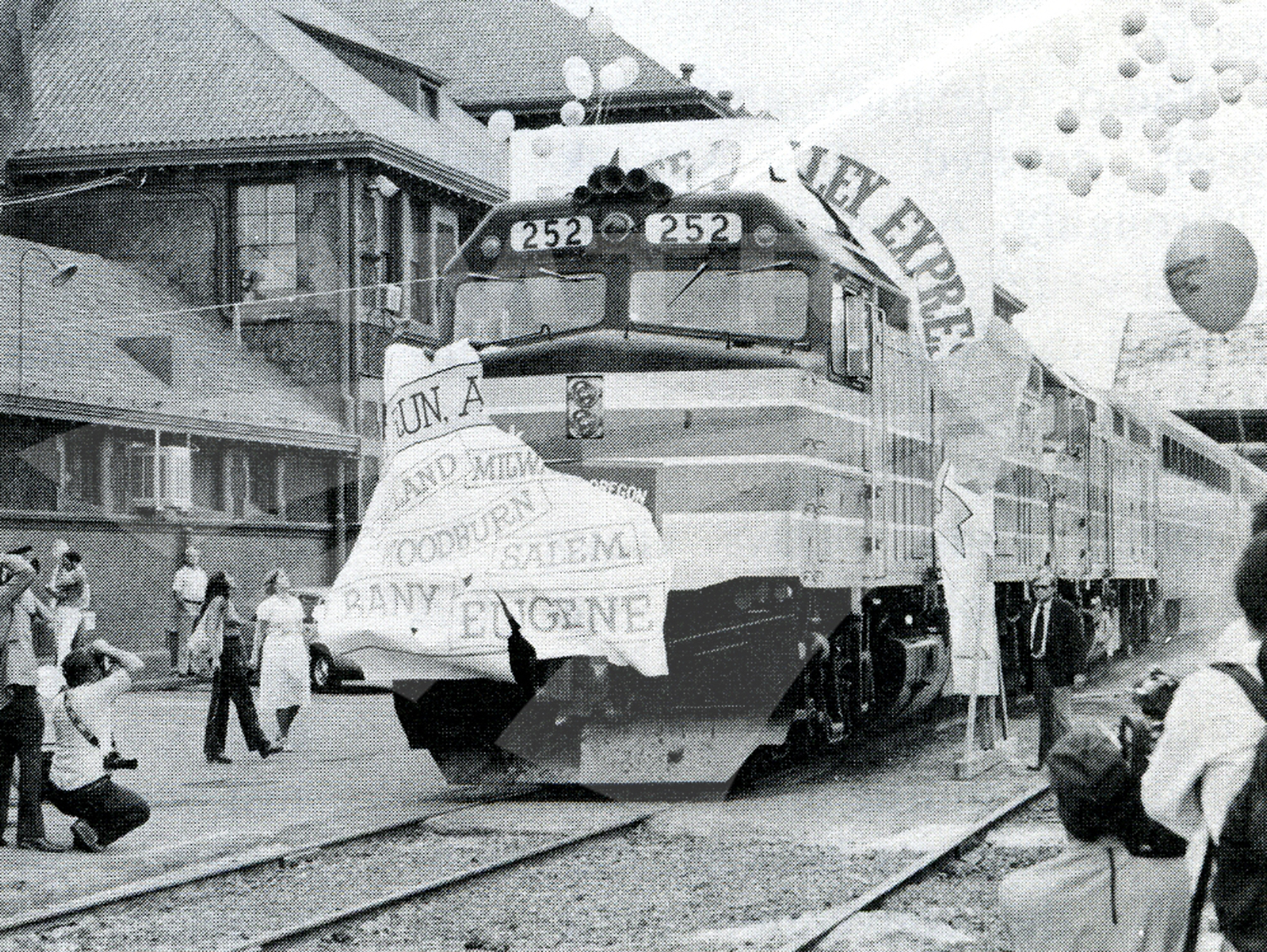
- The inaugural Willamette Valley breaks through a paper barrier at Portland Union Station in August 1980

Overview
- Service type: Inter-city rail
- Status: Former
- Locale: Oregon
- First service: August 3, 1980
- Last service: December 31, 1981
- Successor: Amtrak Cascades
- Former operator: Amtrak
- Ridership: 170 daily passengers

Route
- Termini: Portland Union Station
- Distance travelled: 126 mi (203 km)

Technical
- Track gauge: 1,435 mm (4 ft 8 1/2 in)

The Willamette Valley, also known as the Willamette Valley Express, was a passenger train operated by Amtrak between Portland, Oregon and Eugene, Oregon, in the early 1980s. The name came from the Willamette Valley region which the train ran through.

== History ==
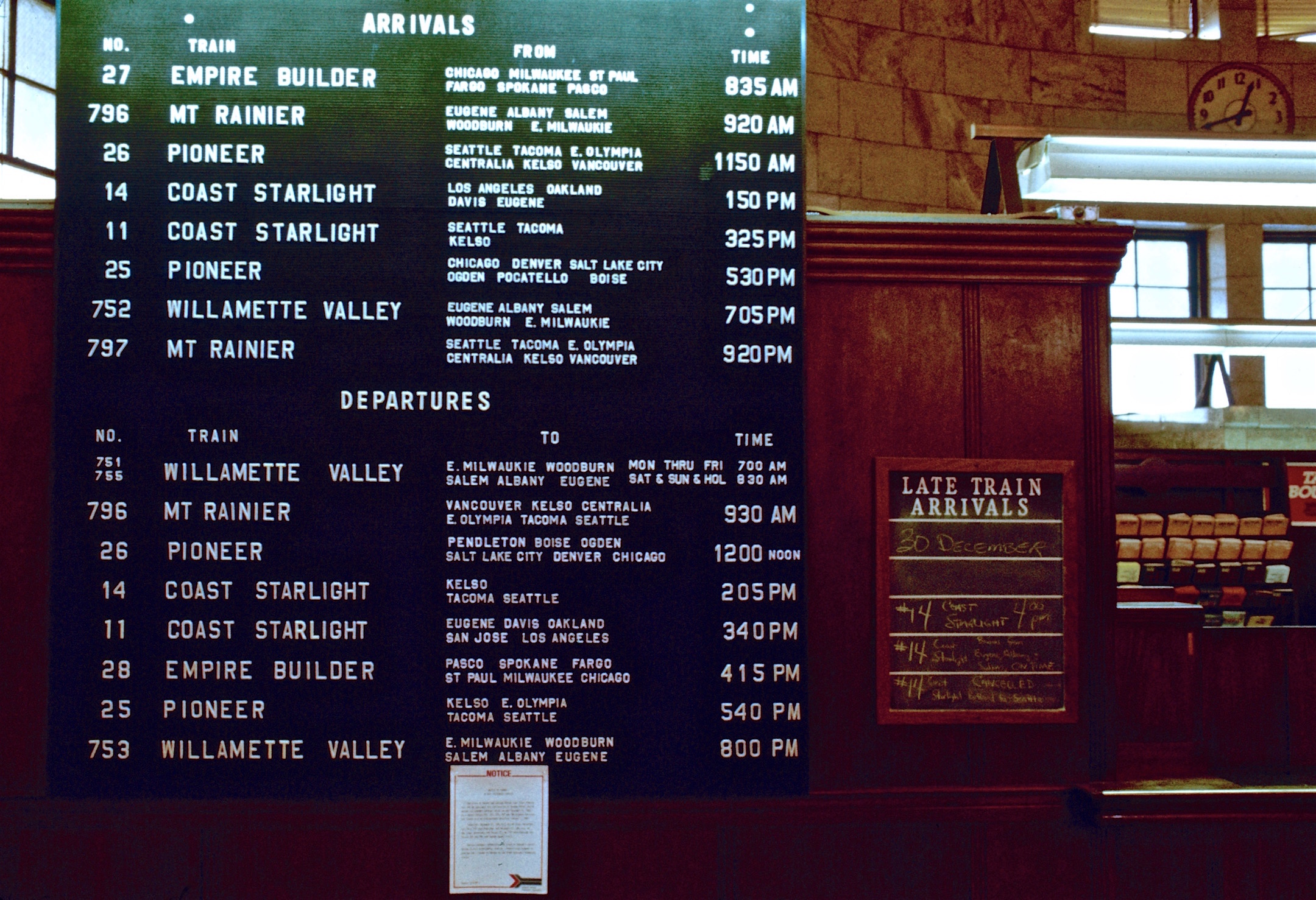
The arrivals and departures board inside Portland Union Station in 1981, listing the Willamette Valley trains

Amtrak introduced the train on August 3, 1980, with support from the state of Oregon. The new twice-daily service supplemented the long-distance Coast Starlight and added stops at Milwaukie and Woodburn. The Willamette Valley carried a cafe car and unreserved coaches. The initial trial run was slated to last until June 30, 1981. Two Willamette Valleys (#751 and #753) operated southbound in the morning and afternoon, respectively, while one (#752) operated northbound in the early afternoon. Amtrak began originating the Mount Rainier (#790) in Eugene instead of Portland for the morning northbound service.

In July 1981 the federal government approved funding to continue the trains through 1984 provided that Oregon continued to pay one-third of the subsidy. In early August the state legislature approved additional funds to keep the trains running through the end of 1981 amid concerns over a fare hike and falling ridership. Amtrak discontinued the Willamette Valley at the end of the year after Oregon declined to continue funding the trains. The Willamette Valley made its final run on December 31, 1981. The train averaged 170 passengers per day, half of the goal. However, monthly passenger miles averaged 620,000 - 98% of goal - indicating that most passengers were traveling the full route.

Multiple daily frequencies south of Portland would not return until October 30, 1994, when the Mount Rainier was extended to Eugene on a trial basis. The Mount Rainier was renamed as the Cascadia in 1995, and folded into the Amtrak Cascades brand in 1998. The Willamette Valley stops at East Milwaukie and Woodburn were never reinstated, though Oregon City station was added to the Amtrak Cascades in April 2004.
