= Pasco Intermodal Train Station =

Passenger rail and bus station in Washington, United States

Pasco, WA
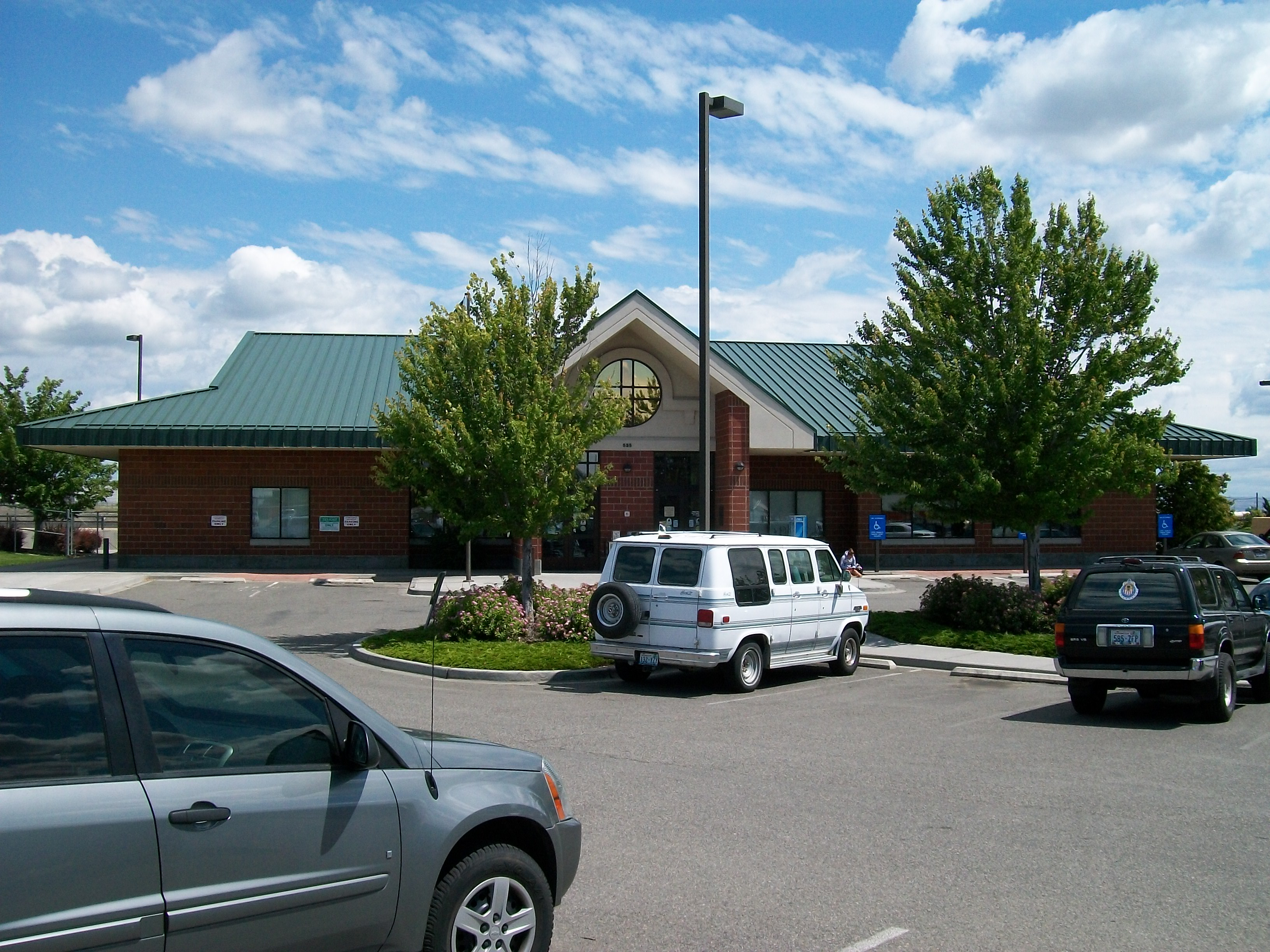

General information
- Other names: Pasco Intermodal Train Station
- Location: 535 North 1st Avenue; Pasco, Washington; United States
- Coordinates: 46°14′13″N 119°5′15″W
- Owner: City of Pasco
- Line: BNSF Lakeside / Fallbridge Subdivisions
- Platforms: 1 side platform
- Tracks: 1
- Connections: Greyhound Lines

Construction
- Parking: Yes
- Accessible: Yes

Other information
- Station code: Amtrak: PSC

History
- Opened: 1998

Passengers
- FY 2025: 19,275 (Amtrak)

Services
Preceding station	Amtrak	Following station
Wishram toward Portland	Empire Builder	Spokane toward Chicago
Location

Pasco Intermodal Train Station is a station on the Amtrak's Empire Builder line in Pasco, Washington, United States. The station is a stop on the Portland section of the Builder, and serves the Tri-Cities of Richland, Pasco, and Kennewick. The station and parking are owned by the City of Pasco. The track and platforms are owned by BNSF Railway. It is also the Greyhound Lines inter-city bus station for the Tri-Cities. Pasco is also a change point for Amtrak engineers on the Empire Builder.
