= Kelso Multimodal Transportation Center =

Amtrak train station near downtown Kelso, Washington

Kelso–Longview, WA
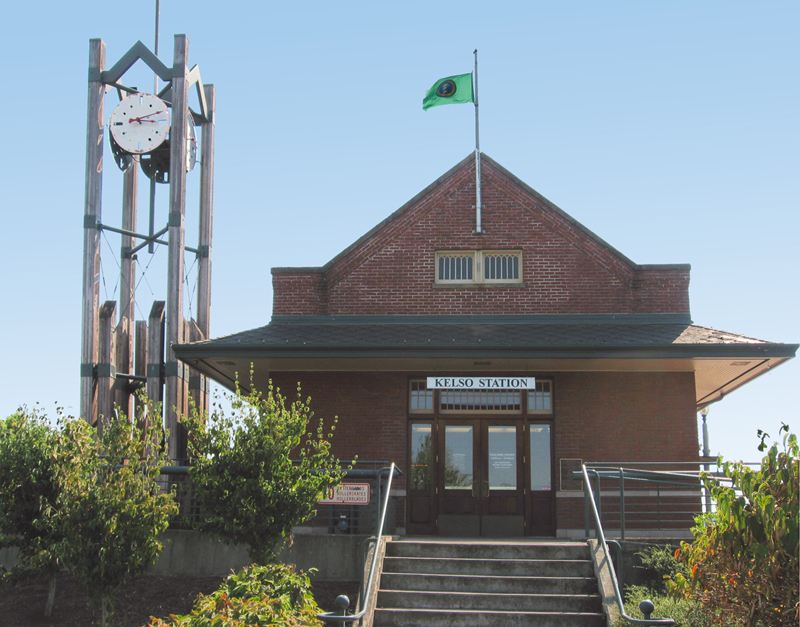
- The transportation center with the clock tower in the background

General information
- Location: 501 South First Avenue; Kelso, Washington; United States
- Coordinates: 46.14215°N 122.91316°W
- Owner: City of Kelso and BNSF Railway
- Line: BNSF Seattle Subdivision
- Platforms: 1 side platform
- Tracks: 2
- Connections: Greyhound Lines; RiverCities Transit

Construction
- Parking: Yes
- Accessible: Yes

Other information
- Station code: Amtrak: KEL

History
- Opened: 1912; 114 years ago
- Rebuilt: 1995; 31 years ago

Passengers
- FY 2025: 38,915 (Amtrak)

Services
Preceding station	Amtrak	Following station
Vancouver, Washington toward Eugene	Amtrak Cascades	Centralia toward Vancouver, British Columbia
Vancouver, Washington toward Los Angeles	Coast Starlight	Centralia toward Seattle
Former services
Preceding station	Amtrak	Following station
Centralia toward Seattle	Pioneer Discontinued in 1997	Vancouver, Washington toward Chicago
Joint Great Northern/Northern Pacific/ Union Pacific service
Preceding station	Great Northern Railway	Following station
Carrolls toward Portland	Portland–Seattle Line	Ostrander toward Seattle
Preceding station	Northern Pacific Railway	Following station
Carrolls toward Portland	Portland–Seattle Line	Ostrander toward Seattle
Preceding station	Union Pacific Railroad	Following station
Carrolls toward Portland	Portland–Seattle Line	Ostrander toward Seattle
Location

The Kelso Multimodal Transportation Center (also known as Kelso–Longview) is an Amtrak train station located near downtown Kelso, Washington, United States. The station also serves the neighboring city of Longview, which is located just across the Cowlitz River. The station is served by Cascades and Coast Starlight trains. Greyhound Lines provides national and regional bus service, while RiverCities Transit provides local transit. Shuttle vans, taxis and rental cars can also be hired at the station.

== History ==
Kelso's first train station was built for the Northern Pacific Railroad. The first small depot was a wooden structure in the 100 block of Front or First Avenue. By 1906 the citizens of Kelso petitioned the Northern Pacific Railroad for a better passenger and freight depot. This was granted and a new, brick passenger and a wood freight depot was built. A grand opening reception was held February 12, 1912. The line was also operated by passenger trains by the Great Northern Railway and Union Pacific Railroad under a joint service agreement.

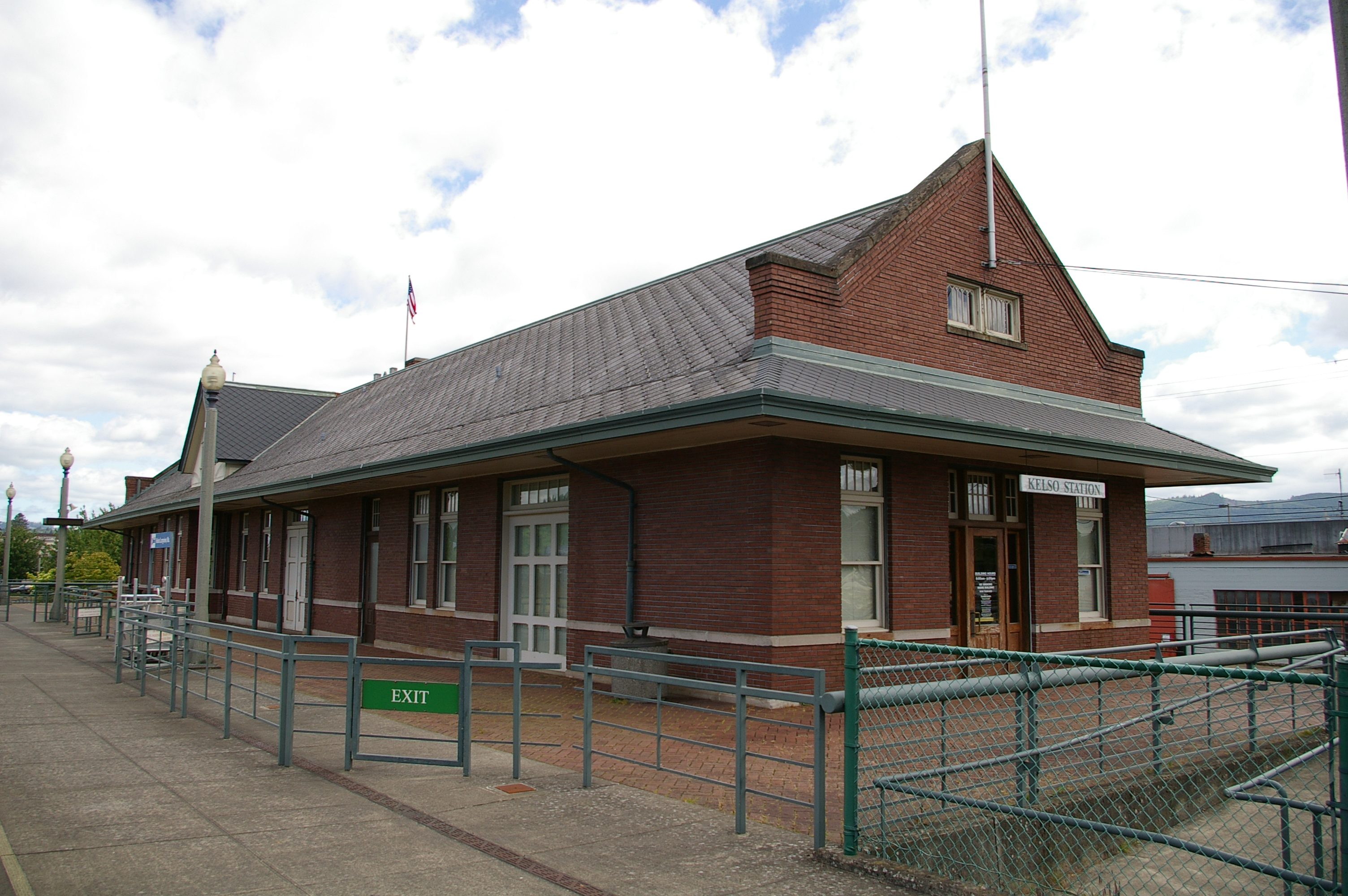
View of the station from the platform

In 1970 the Northern Pacific Railway merged with several other railroads to create the Burlington Northern Railroad. The station remained in active freight service until the early 1980s when Burlington Northern suspended freight service there and transferred that service to the Portland, Oregon hub. Amtrak service to Kelso began on July 12, 1971, a few months after the company took over national passenger rail service.

The station was staffed by a ticketing agent until the 1990s when the station was locked up due to vandalism.

=== Station remodel ===
In 1994 and 1995, the station was inundated with water damage when the nearby Cowlitz River peaked over the dike at 22 feet (6.7 m) and flooded the basement and platform area, which ultimately led to the approval of the remodel. In the mid-1990s the station underwent extensive remodeling to make it look like the passenger stations of a bygone era. The interior and exterior were rebuilt to resemble historic train stations, and a 30-foot-tall (9.1 m) clock tower was constructed outside the station. The refurbished station was formally dedicated on September 23, 1995.

Greyhound service to the depot was temporarily disrupted from 2006 to 2007 after a dispute with the city over maintenance costs.

== Service ==
Although the Amtrak Cascades runs between Eugene, Oregon and Vancouver, British Columbia, Canada, there is no train that starts at one terminus and ends at the other. However, each day eight Amtrak Cascades trains (four northbound and four southbound) stop at the Kelso Multimodal Transportation Center. The Coast Starlight has runs one train daily in each direction between Los Angeles, California and Seattle. The next northbound stop on both Amtrak trains is in Centralia and the next southbound stop is in Vancouver.

The intermodal center is also served by intercity Greyhound buses from Portland and Seattle, as well as local buses operated by RiverCities Transit, the local transit authority.

== Boardings and alightings ==
Year	2011	2012	2013	2014	2015	2016	2017	2018
Total	26,972	26,560	28,892	30,326	31,017	31,660	29,937	31,228
YOY Difference	-	-412	2,332	1,434	691	643	-1,723	1,201
YOY Difference %	-	-1.52%	8.78%	4.96%	2.28%	2.07%	-5.44%	4.31%

== Incidents ==
A head-on crash between a Burlington Northern and Union Pacific train occurred just south of Kelso on November 11, 1993. Five crew were killed in the accident and subsequent fire, which was fueled by approximately 10,000 U.S. gallons (38,000 L) of diesel fuel on board the trains. The double track corridor in the area served around 60 passenger and freight trains per day, making it one of the busiest rail corridors in the United States at the time of the accident. The Kelso station was used as a staging area for Burlington Northern's Incident Response Unit.

== Other uses ==
Numerous special events are held at the station each year, the most notable of which is the Kelso Christmas Celebration at which the mayor lights the Christmas tree that adorns the clock tower and Santa Claus makes a visit via the Amtrak Cascades train.

Between 1999 and 2004, the Kelso City Council held its meetings in the station's basement, because City Hall had been torn down to make way for a new bridge spanning the Cowlitz River.
