= Centralia station (Washington) =

Amtrak train station in Centralia, Washington

Centralia, WA
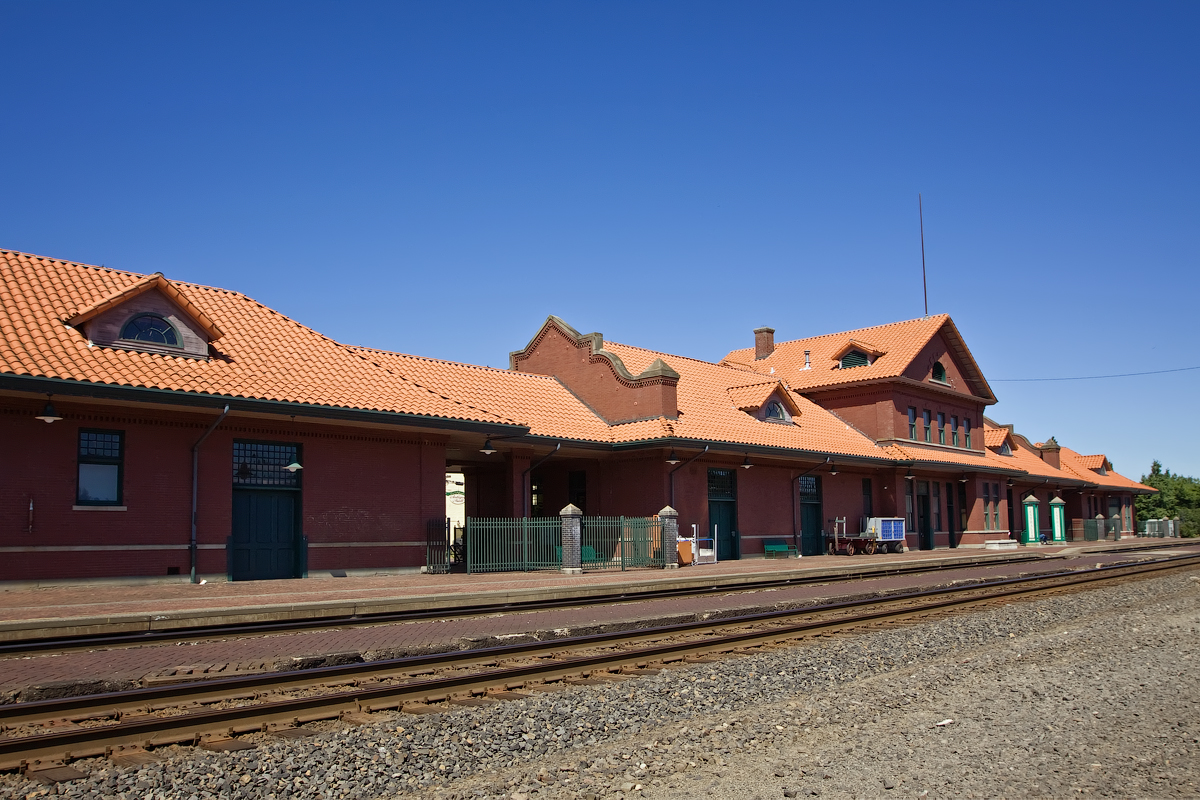
- Centralia Union Depot, 2011

General information
- Location: 210 Railroad Avenue; Centralia, Washington; United States
- Coordinates: 46°43′04″N 122°57′08″W
- Owner: BNSF Railway & City of Centralia
- Line: BNSF Seattle Subdivision
- Platforms: 1 side platform
- Tracks: 1
- Connections: Lewis County Transit

Construction
- Parking: Yes
- Accessible: Yes

Other information
- Station code: Amtrak: CTL

History
- Opened: 1912; 114 years ago
- Rebuilt: 2002; 24 years ago

Passengers
- FY 2025: 32,166 (Amtrak)

Services
| Preceding station | Amtrak | Following station |
|---|---|---|
| Kelso toward Eugene | Amtrak Cascades | Olympia–Lacey toward Vancouver, British Columbia |
| Kelso toward Los Angeles | Coast Starlight | Olympia–Lacey toward Seattle |
Former services
| Preceding station | Amtrak | Following station |
|---|---|---|
| Olympia-Lacey toward Seattle | Pioneer Discontinued in 1997 | Kelso toward Chicago |
Joint Great Northern/Northern Pacific/ Union Pacific service
| Preceding station | Great Northern Railway | Following station |
| Chehalis toward Portland | Portland–Seattle Line | Bucoda toward Seattle |
| Preceding station | Northern Pacific Railway | Following station |
| Chehalis toward Portland | Portland–Seattle Line | Bucoda toward Seattle |
| Preceding station | Union Pacific Railroad | Following station |
| Chehalis toward Portland | Portland–Seattle Line | Bucoda toward Seattle |
- Centralia Union Depot
- U.S. National Register of Historic Places
- Washington State Heritage Register
- Interactive map of Centralia Union Depot
- Area: less than one acre
- Built: 1912
- Built by: Northern Pacific Railway
- Architect: Rounds-Hursen Co.
- Architectural style: Mission Revival, Late 19th and 20th Century Revivals
- Restored: 1996-2002
- NRHP reference No.: 88000608

Significant dates
- Added to NRHP: May 19, 1988
- Designated WSHR: May 19, 1988
Location

The Centralia Union Depot, also known as Centralia Union Station, is an Amtrak train station in Centralia, Washington, United States. It is served by the Cascades and Coast Starlight trains. The building was constructed in 1912 for the Northern Pacific Railroad and replaced an earlier depot. It was added to the National Register of Historic Places (NRHP) in 1988.

The city became a railroad center in the late 19th and early 20th centuries, known for coal, mined metals, and timber freight, as well as numerous passenger trains passing through the area. Centralia adopted the nickname, "Hub City", as a result. The city's first depot was built beginning in 1890, followed by a larger station in 1905. Union Station is a long and narrow brick structure with three separate buildings connected by two breezeways. The two-story main terminal, with a dominant hip roof and gable, contains a coved ceiling as well as original fixtures, millwork and other features. An intensive restoration project was undertaken in the mid-1990s to renovate and repair the historic building.

Amtrak service began at the station in 1971 and as of 2025, the railroad track and platforms are owned by BNSF Railway. The depot, located in the Centralia Downtown Historic District, is owned by the city, part of a $1 purchase agreement in 1994.

== Description ==
The Centralia Union Depot is located on Railroad Avenue between Magnolia and Pine streets in the Centralia Downtown Historic District. The station's north-south layout sits parallel to the train tracks. The east facade faces the tracks and the west side facing the downtown core.

The depot was added to the National Register of Historic Places and the Washington State Heritage Register on May 19, 1988. The NRHP nomination noted the station's importance to the city's history as well as Centralia's major railroad connections to the region. The economic railroad boom of Centralia during the early 20th century, and the depot's focal point in the city's downtown district, were also recognized in the historical designation.

The Centralia Union Station is similar in architectural style to other medium-sized city train stations in the state, such as the Ellensburg station and Yakima's Burlington Northern Passenger Depot. The Centralia Union Depot has remained the only such of its architectural type to continue passenger operations. Along with the NRHP-listed Burlington Northern Depot in Chehalis, Centralia Union Station has served as a halfway travel point between the Columbia River and Puget Sound.

=== Service ===
The station is served by two Amtrak lines with seven daily round trips. The Cascades travels from Seattle to Portland, Oregon, with six daily trips; several trips also continue south to Eugene, Oregon, and north to Vancouver, British Columbia. The Coast Starlight has one daily train through Centralia on its route between Seattle and Los Angeles.

The station became a flag stop, or an on-demand stop for boarding or disembarking passengers, for Amtrak in June 1971.

In 2017, Amtrak and WSDOT proposed to no longer provide staff for the depot, citing an increase in automated and online transactions by passengers.

== Background ==
=== Railroad beginnings ===
Northern Pacific Railroad (NPR) completed a rail line between Kalama and Olympia in 1872, connecting the city of Centerville to the region. The community was renamed to Centralia in 1883 and the rail company began building a rail bridge in 1890 over the Skookumchuck River near the town. As part of an agreement to connect the city with the newly constructed rail lines, the community was required to build a depot and provide NPR with a right of way. The city was to welcome Northern Pacific president, Henry Villard, in 1883. The newly built station was decorated with a large archway and a celebration was prepared. Villard's train passed by the depot without stopping.

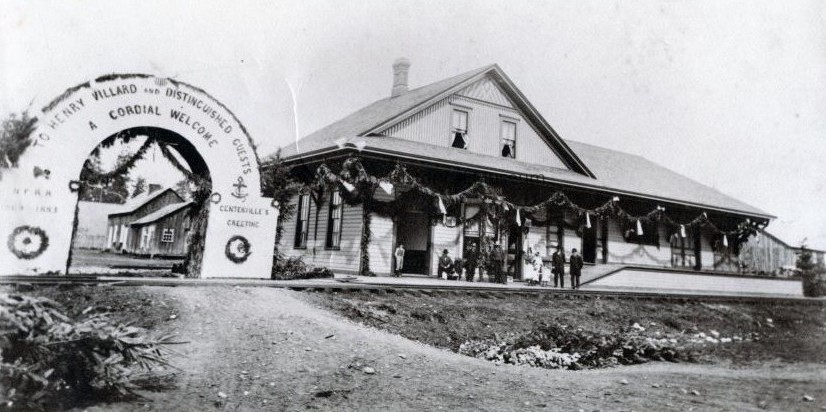
First depot and Henry Villard arch, 1883

=== Northern Pacific Depot, 1890 ===
The wood-framed Northern Pacific Depot was built beginning in 1890 and opened by March 1892; it remained for a time as the only such station between the Northern Pacific terminuses. President Benjamin Harrison visited Centralia on May 6, 1891, during a whistle stop tour. Harrison made a brief speech in the rain to a crowd of a few hundred people. The building was expanded beginning in 1901 which included a larger railyard and connections to new lines.

=== Northern Pacific Depot, 1905 ===
The first depot was replaced with a larger, wooden station at Third Street in 1905. Based on the architectural design of the red-brick depot, the building was given the moniker, "Noah's Ark". In 1911, a petition request was sent to Northern Pacific to supply the depot with a "matron", providing protection for young women from dangerous people at the station who might lead "young girls to ruin". A matron was appointed that July.

The city of Centralia's early railroad economy, and numerous transpiration corridors of rail lines, rivers, and roads, led the community to be known as the "Hub City". Main freight handling and shipments of the two early stations included coal, mined metals such as gold and iron, and timber and timber-manufactured products. By the early 20th century, an average of 60 trains per day were recorded passing through or stopping in Centralia.

During the early 1910s, the second depot was criticized in the local press for its appearance, considering it "just as bad" as the station in Chehalis. (Note: The 19th century stations in Centralia and Chehalis were known as the "Twin Depots".) Northern Pacific purchased a parcel for a new depot in early 1910, with an original construction cost estimated at $50,000, equivalent to $1,727,679 in 2025. A severe snowstorm in January 1912 led to telegraph and telephone service outages in the city. Some wires, which ran through the depot, were severed leading to short circuiting of the station's telephone switchboard and causing a small fire.

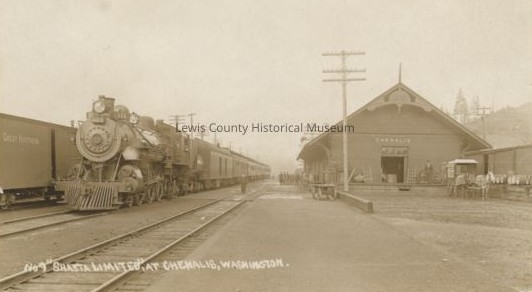
North view of Northern Pacific Depot, ca. 1909

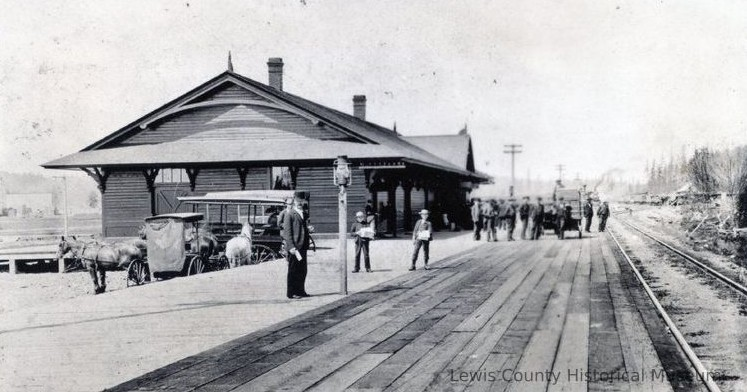
South view of Northern Pacific Depot, ca. 1905-1910

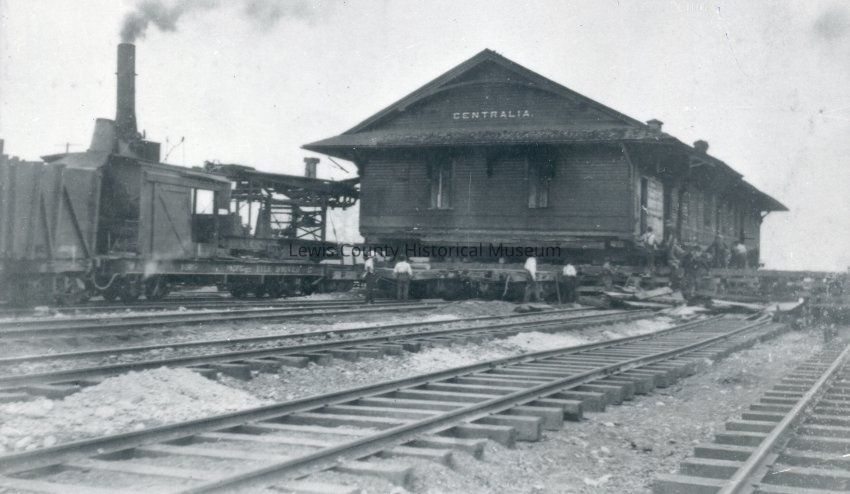
Moving Northern Pacific Depot during construction, 1912

== History ==
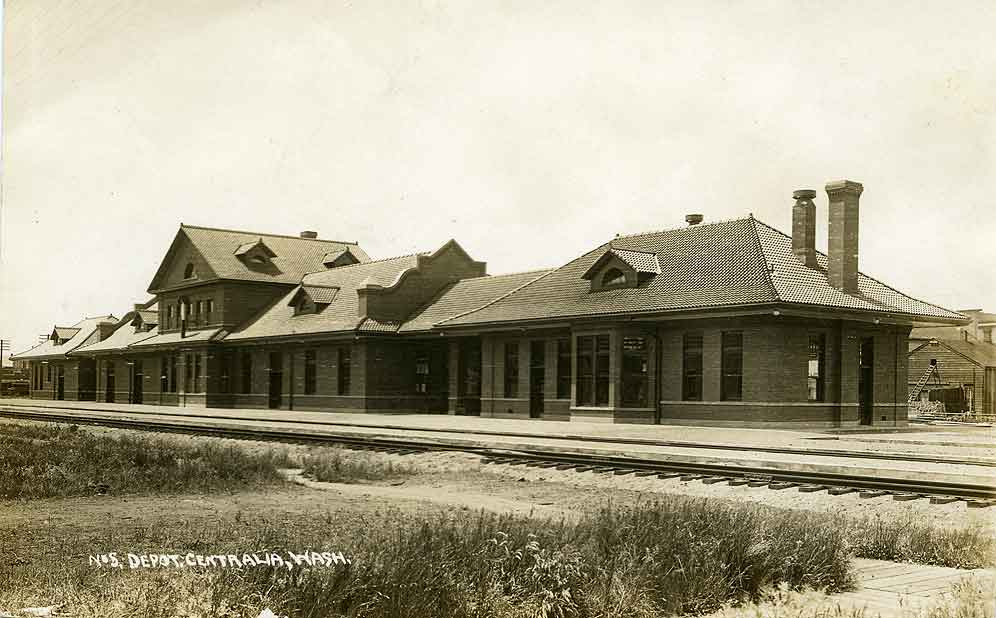
Centralia Union Depot, ca. 1912

The Centralia Union Depot, also known as Union Station, was built to accommodate a 400% population boom in the area from 1900 to 1914. By 1912, an average of 22 passenger trains traveled through Centralia, and an additional 22 trains per day were operated by six branch lines. Led by requests from the Centralia Commercial Club and other prominent members in the community, the station was constructed and opened by Northern Pacific Railway (NPR) in 1912. Approximately 500 laborers completed the effort. The station was larger and more expensive than the Burlington Northern Depot in nearby Chehalis that was being constructed at approximately the same time.

Initially estimated to cost $500,000, equivalent to $16,681,034 in 2025 , the $750,000 depot was formally dedicated on June 1, 1912, during Centralia's first Hub City Festival. (Note: The moniker, Hub City Festival, was specifically chosen for the city-wide event by the Southwest Washington Development Association in April 1912. Under the NRHP nomination, the name is recorded as "Hub City Day".) The attending crowd was considered the largest ever assembled in the city at the time. The dedication, which was to also celebrate the city's new high school, library, and recently moved post office, was overseen by Centralia judge George Dysart. The ceremonial address was given by George T. Reid, a council for Northern Pacific. Approximately 100 representatives of various railroad companies attended the event. The depot was christened by airplane, with dropped champagne bottles by local aviator, Claude Berlin; the bottles broke several of the roof's tiles.

Within two years after its opening, Centralia Union Depot was being served by 44 passenger trains and 17 freight trains daily. The station, which also contained a 20-stall railway roundhouse that was built in 1913, (Note: The NRHP nomination form mentions the roundhouse to have contained 80 stalls.) faced 14 hotels along Tower Avenue, as well as 5 theaters and 8 banks in the downtown core. Western Union rented office space at the station during its early operations. Union Pacific began operating out of the roundhouse, fueling their trains with coal from the nearby mines of Tono. Additional railroad companies to use the station included Great Northern Railway and the Oregon-Washington Railroad and Navigation Company, along with various branch lines that linked to other communities in Southwest Washington, including Grays Harbor and South Bend.

An artesian well was discovered in 1916 below the basement after water began to seep through a crack in the concrete. The well slowly began to flood the space and eventually cracked a larger section of cement. The railroad installed a steam pump to control the water.

=== Early Amtrak era ===
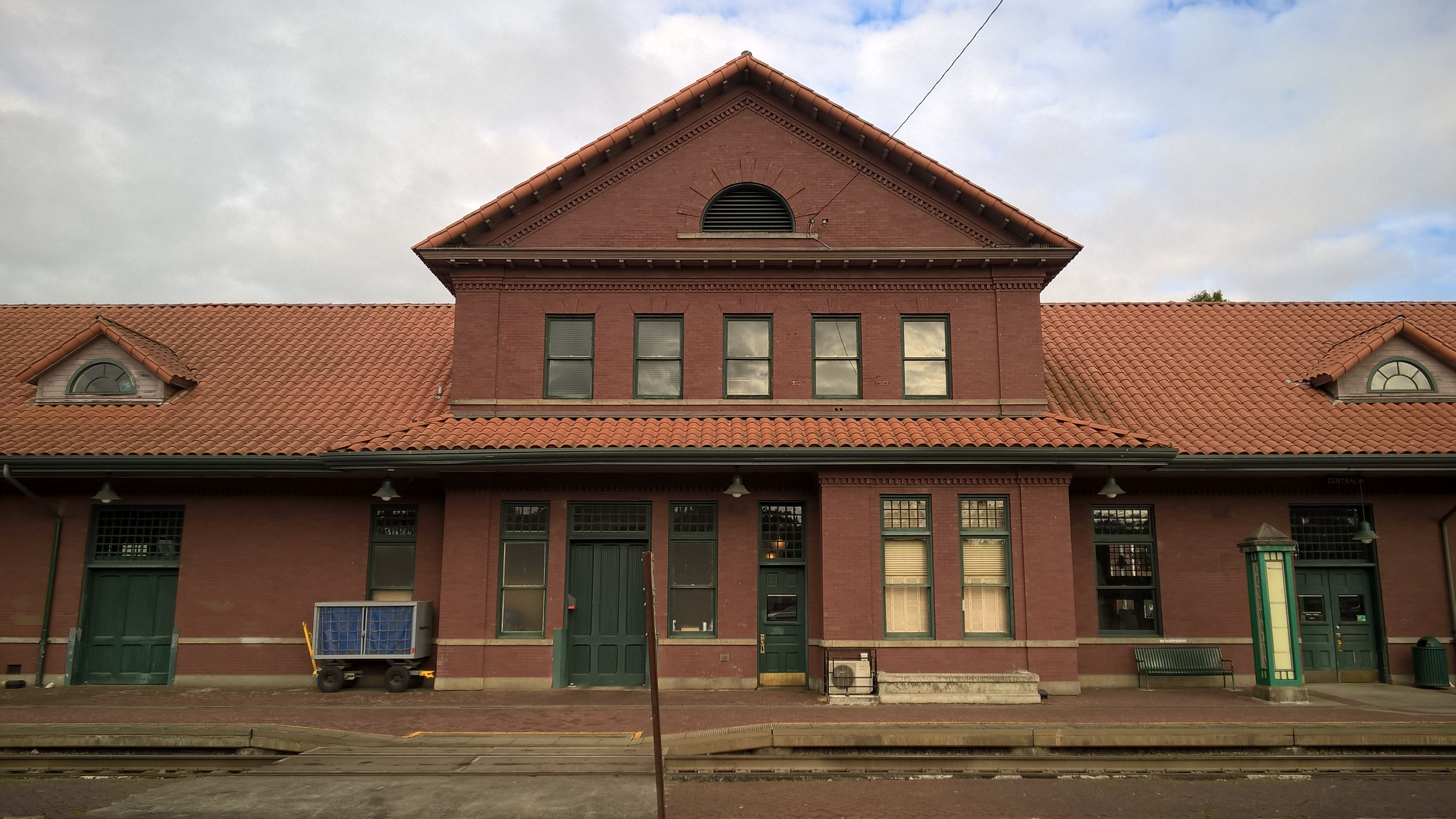
Platform and exterior of main terminal, 2016

Northern Pacific later merged into Burlington Northern Railroad (BN) in 1970, and Amtrak began operating passenger rail service on the Seattle–Portland route on May 1, 1971. Amtrak trains initially did not stop in Centralia but were added during a service change on July 12, 1971. In early 1972, passengers were permanently diverted from the Chehalis Depot to Centralia. The two depots merged their operations and employees in Centralia beginning in January 1973; the Chehalis station was officially closed the next month.

The demise of Northern Pacific, coupled with increased automobile traffic on Interstate 5, saw the Centralia Union Depot deteriorate, much as the city's downtown core was experiencing economic decline. Local civic leaders recognized the problem during the mid-1980s and began a two-decade project that would see the structure acquired by the city and restored as part of a larger downtown revitalization project. The city began a tourism initiative in 1992 known as Destination Centralia. By 1996, the program noted 22,000 visitors came to the city via the depot by passenger rail.

=== Restoration ===
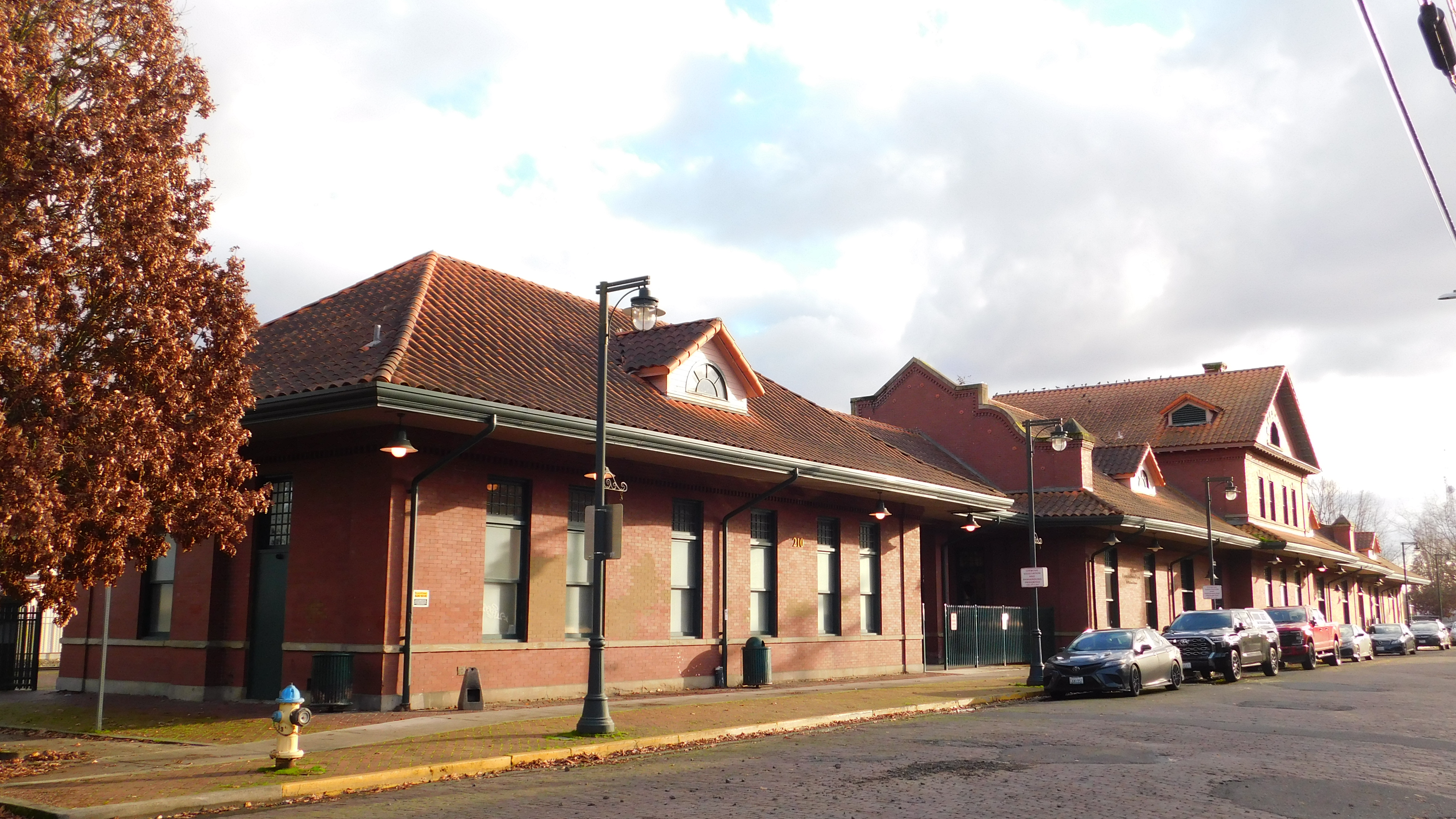
Terminal and annexes, 2025

Under the Washington State Department of Transportation (WSDOT), the station was purchased in 1994 for $1; the agency transferred ownership to Centralia. Burlington Northern continued to own the land and the sale required the city to maintain the structure for 25 years. The 1996 merger of Burlington Northern with the Atchison, Topeka and Santa Fe Railway to form the BNSF Railway (BNSF) spurred both the city and the state's Department of Transportation Rail Branch to negotiate with BNSF to fully acquire the depot. The city had planned for the station to become a "transportation hub", (Note: City documentation during the 1990s referred to the depot as an "intermodal transportation center".) connecting the depot to a larger high-speed rail corridor. Ideas also included connecting the station to the county's Twin Transit bus system. The renovation of the station was also part of a larger, urban renewal of the city's historic downtown.

Following the purchase, the city began the design process for the historic restoration which took place over three phases. During the renovation in 1996, Amtrak announced a potential closure of the depot's ticket office, which at the time, was the only such staffed Amtrak office between Kelso and Tacoma. Citing low ridership numbers and decreasing revenue, Amtrak postulated that the office would remain open if ticket sales increased from $20,000 per month to $30,000. The restoration project was completed in April 2002 and celebrated in the city's "Railroad Days" festival. The total cost of the project was recorded between $4.4 million and $4.8 million.

In 2000, space at the station was leased to a consulting firm and the second floor of the terminal was rented to a local business after the restoration. By 2004, the depot was temporarily used by the Centralia Police Department. The main lobby, intended as rental space after the renovation, was instead used as a community multi-purpose area.

The Centralia Post Office offered a special pictorial cancellation in 2012 in honor of the 100th anniversary of the depot. The postmark stamp pictured an oncoming steam locomotive. The depot was adorned with an historical plaque in 2024 that featured a QR code, allowing visitors access to a website detailing the history of the station. The effort was authorized by the Centralia Historic Preservation Commission and undertaken by the Centralia Downtown Association, a member of Main Street America.

=== Notable events and incidents ===
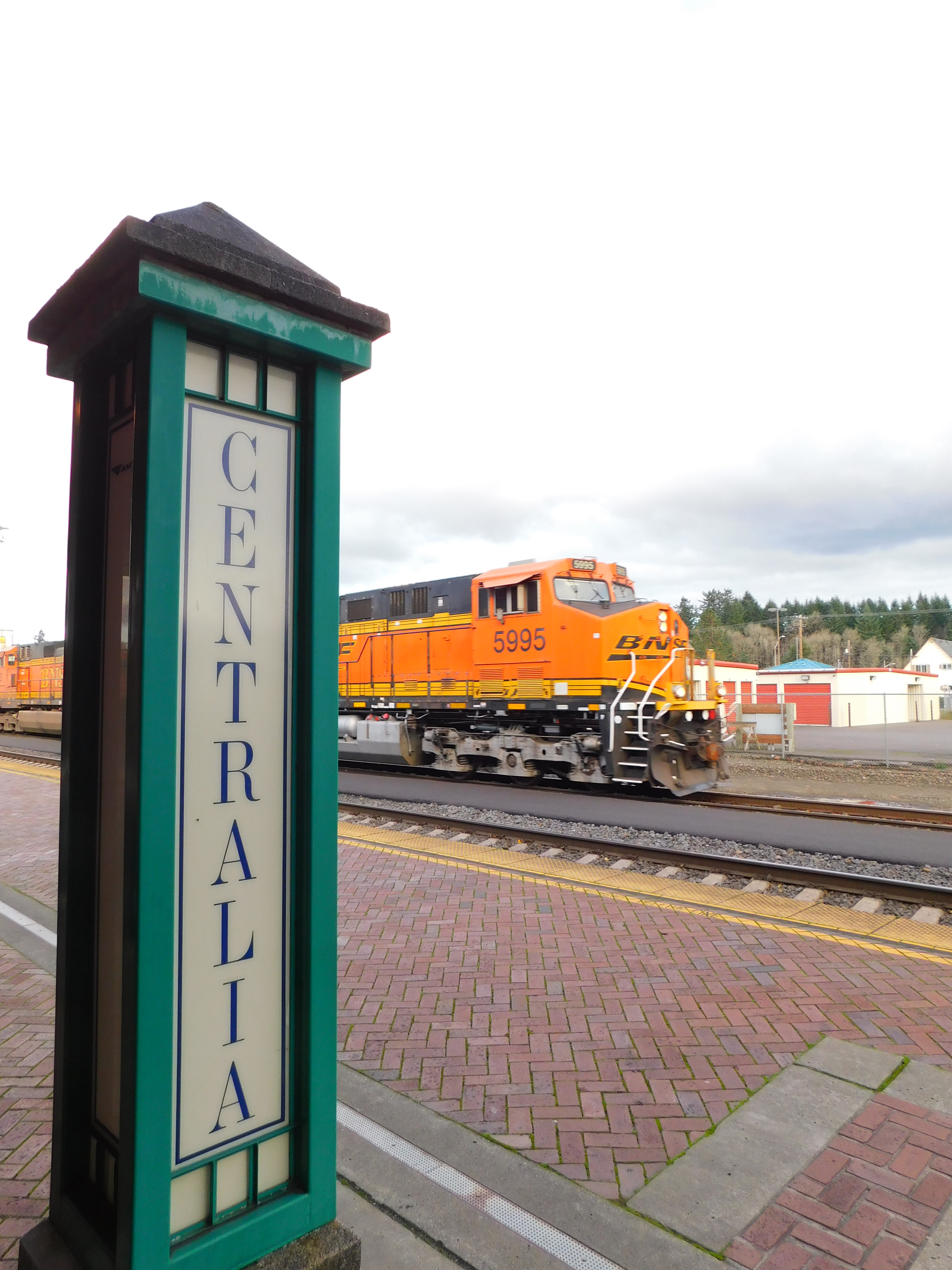
Platform and tracks, 2025

Centralia residents were able to view the Liberty Bell at the station in July 1915 during the artifact's train trip to the Panama–Pacific International Exposition. A LMS Royal Scot Class passenger train stopped at the depot after midnight on October 26, 1933 while on a nationwide trip; it had recently been exhibited at the 1933 World's Fair. Arriving a half-hour late, a crowd estimated at 2,500 people turned out to view the train.

The first recorded dignitary to visit the Centralia Union Depot was William Jennings Bryant who spoked from the station's platform. French field marshal, Ferdinand Foch visited in December 1921. A large welcome party and a crowd of thousands listened as Foch spoke in French. The marshal came to the city to "pay tribute" to the American Legion men who died during the Centralia Tragedy. A crowd of 10,000 people met President Franklin Roosevelt during a trip to Seattle in September 1937. Roosevelt did not make a speech during the five-minute visit but did appear at the rear platform, interacting with those nearby. In 1952, Dwight Eisenhower briefly stopped at the depot during his presidential campaign, intentionally going to the rear of his train car to interact with a crowd of children, whose loud clapping motivated the future president.

Other notable visitors included postmaster general James Farley in July 1938 while on a personal trip to Alaska. Farley had also been on Roosevelt's 1937 train. In May 1939, then Crown Prince of Norway Olav V and Princess Märtha of Sweden stopped their five-car train to meet Centralia residents in an informal and unofficial five-minute visit. Wendell Willkie visited the depot in September 1940 during a campaign train tour.

Deaths at the station included the decapitation of J.C. Niewenbuys, a Centralia Elks Lodge secretary, after he was run over by a Northern Pacific train in 1927. The night operator for the depot's telegraph office, George Gaudette, died in March 1931 after falling out of a window on the second story of the main terminal. Gaudette was inebriated after a "drinking party" at the depot while he was on watch in the midnight hours; his death was ruled as accidental.

== Architecture and features ==
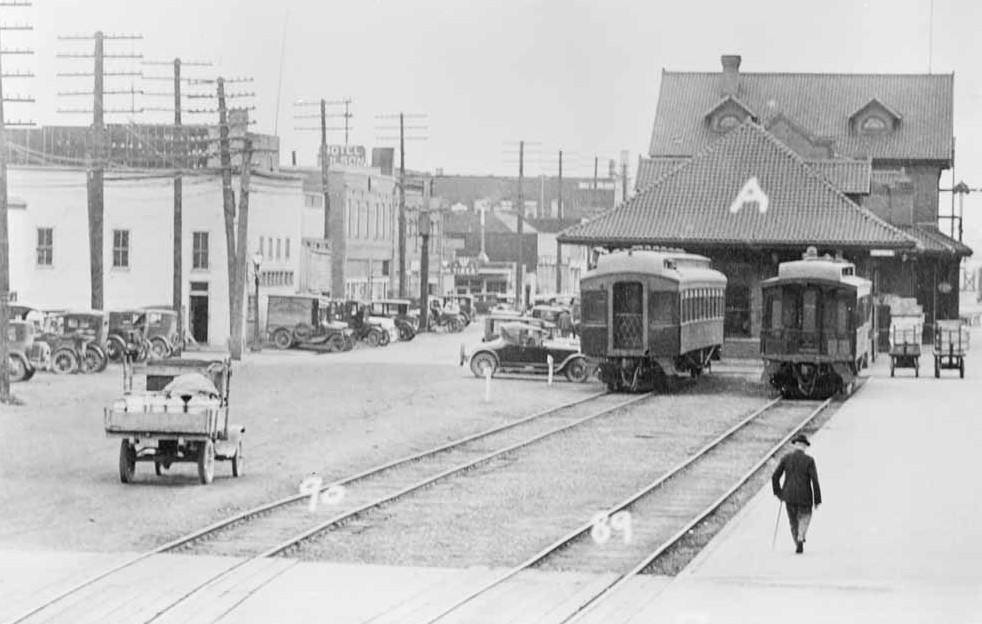
Centralia Union Depot, south view, circa 1927

Unless otherwise noted, the details provided are based on the 1988 National Register of Historic Places (NRHP) nomination form and may not reflect updates or changes to Centralia Union Depot in the interim.

The long, but narrow station encompasses 14,225 square feet (1,321.5 m^{2}), and measures 364 ft × 40 ft (111 m × 12 m). Tenino sandstone provides a base for the concrete foundation. Breezeways separate five sections of the structure, including two annexes and the main terminal. The depot was recorded in 1912 to have red roof tiles and measured 346 feet (105.5 m) in length.

At the time of the historic designation, the depot was noted to be in excellent condition with a mostly unaltered appearance.

=== Exterior ===
The exterior walls are sheathed in red pressed brick, manufactured by Chehalis Brickworks, and the roofline, noted as "massive", is a hipped and gable structure with flared, overhanging eaves on each section of the structure. At the time of the nomination, roof shingles had replaced the original red tiles. (Note: A report by the Centralia Daily Chronicle in 1953 noted that the original roof tiles had been replaced. The removal was part of a remodel that was completed "years ago".)

The symmetrical depot is divided architecturally into five units. The dominant central portion is a two-story pavilion that houses the depot's terminal. It is fashioned with a cross-gable that is perpendicular to the roofline. Pediment gable ends feature cornices, including a raking cornice over a dentil frieze. The main entrance contains a tympanum styled with a half-round fanlight which is bordered by a brick voussoir. The exterior wall are framed with pilasters. Windows are lead glass and are double, one-over-one wood sashes trimmed with a brick hood that features a keystone.

Breezeways connect to the north and south portions, described as annexes. The passageways are open but covered under a gable roof supported by piers made of brick.

The annexes feature a hip roof and each measure approximately 30 ft × 60 ft (9.1 m × 18.3 m). (Note: Reporting from around the 1912 dedication lists the annexes as 32 ft × 60 ft (9.8 m × 18.3 m) in dimension.) Both sections contain a bay window, additional one-over-one windows with transoms, and a single exterior door. A sandstone base trims the annex walls, with additional layers for a concrete sill course and a brick dentil. Brick pilasters are featured on the corners of the sections. Originally, the north section was a "lunch room"; the south annex was an express office.

A paved brick passageway, included under the NRHP designation, spans from the station to the tracks and is laid out in a herringbone pattern.

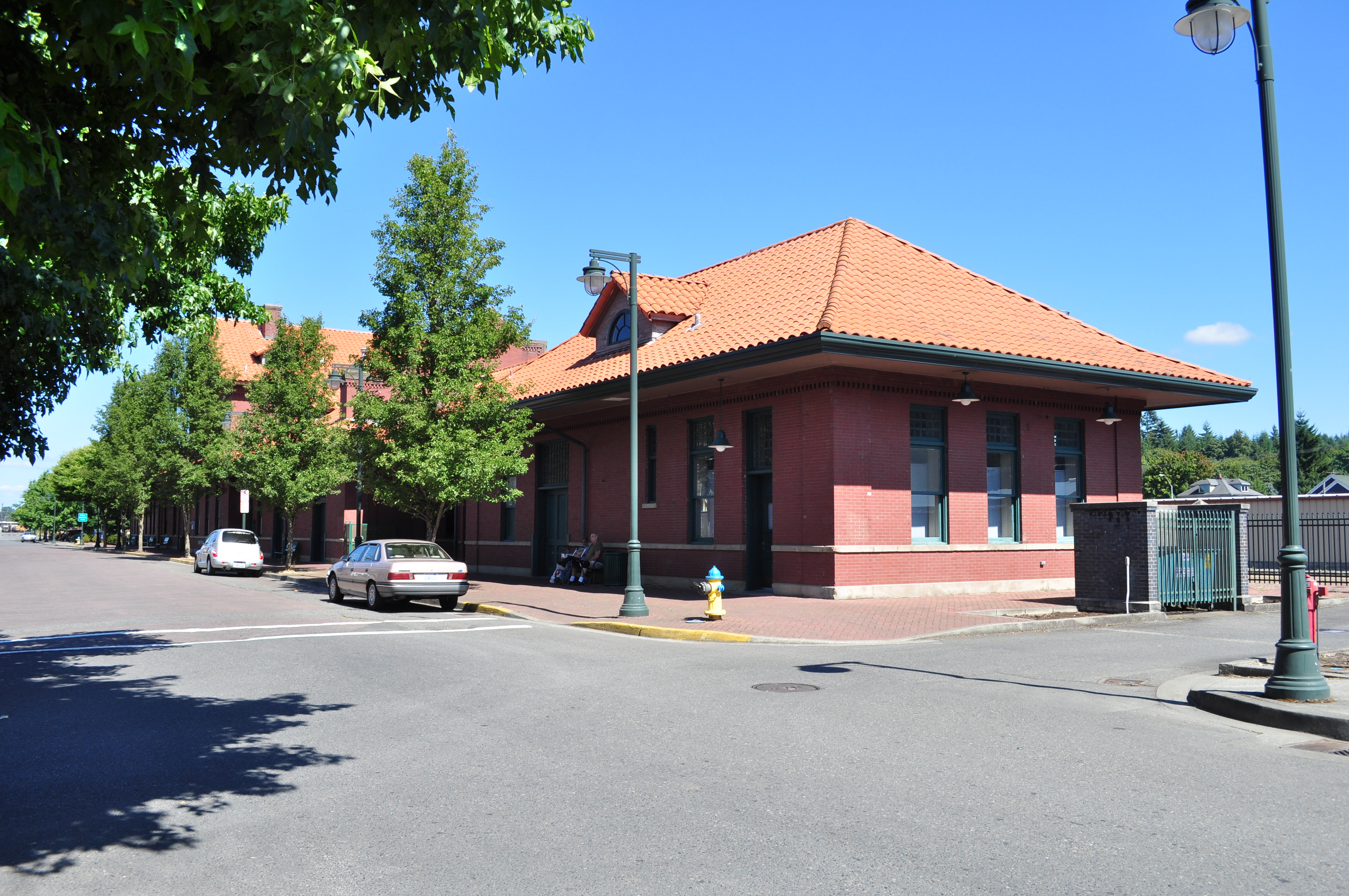
South annex, 2012

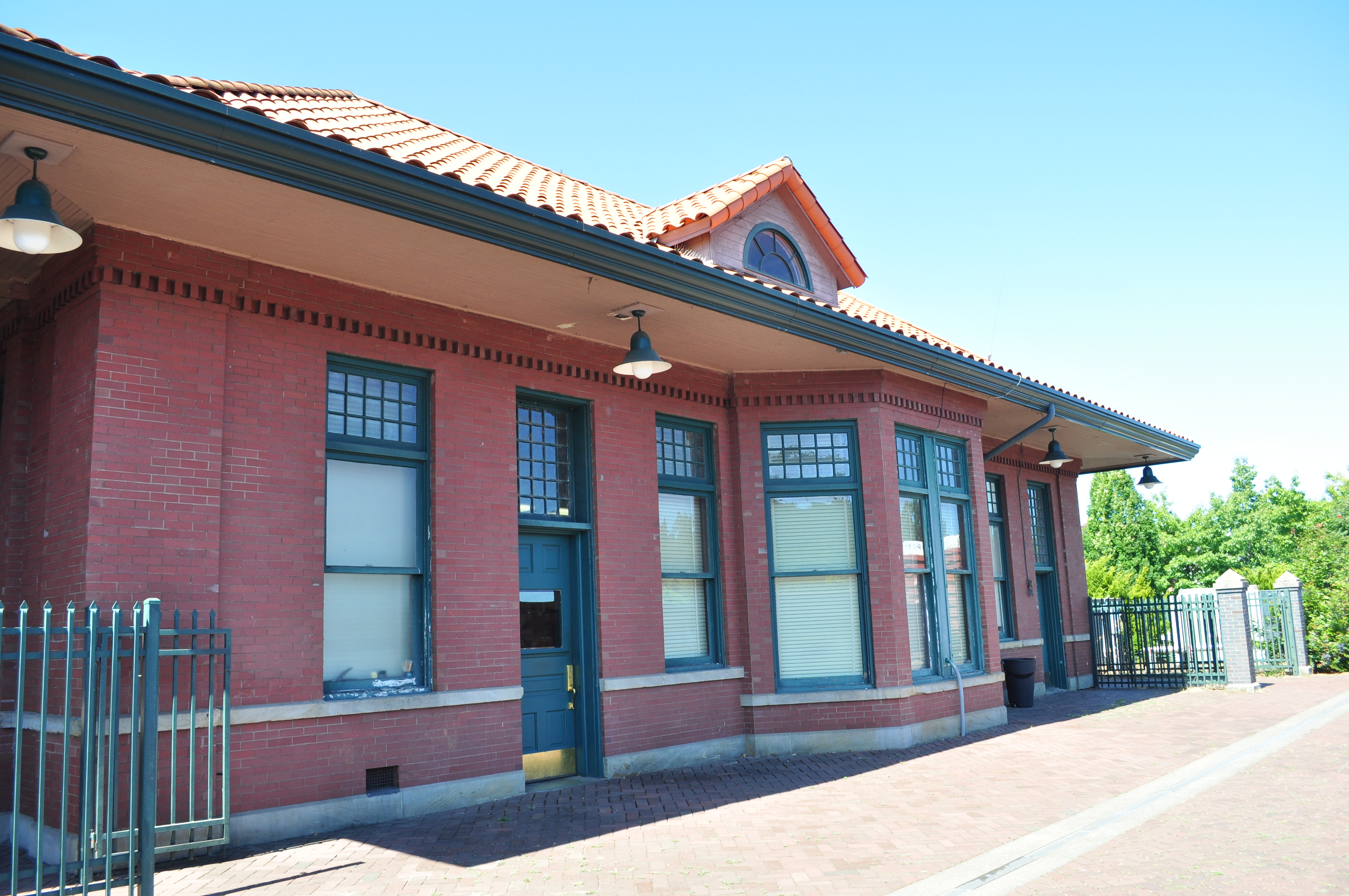
Platform and north annex, 2012

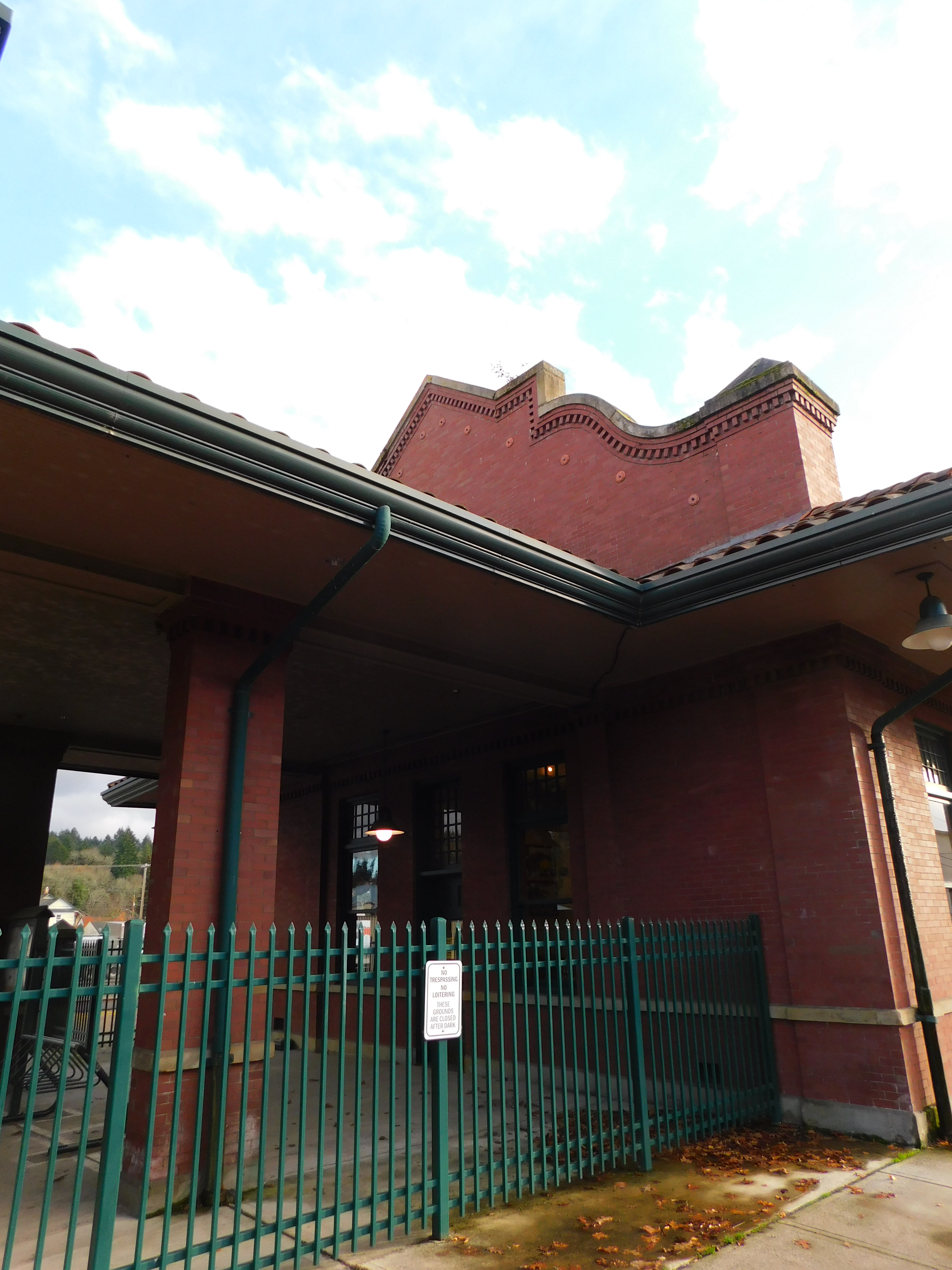
North breezeway, 2025

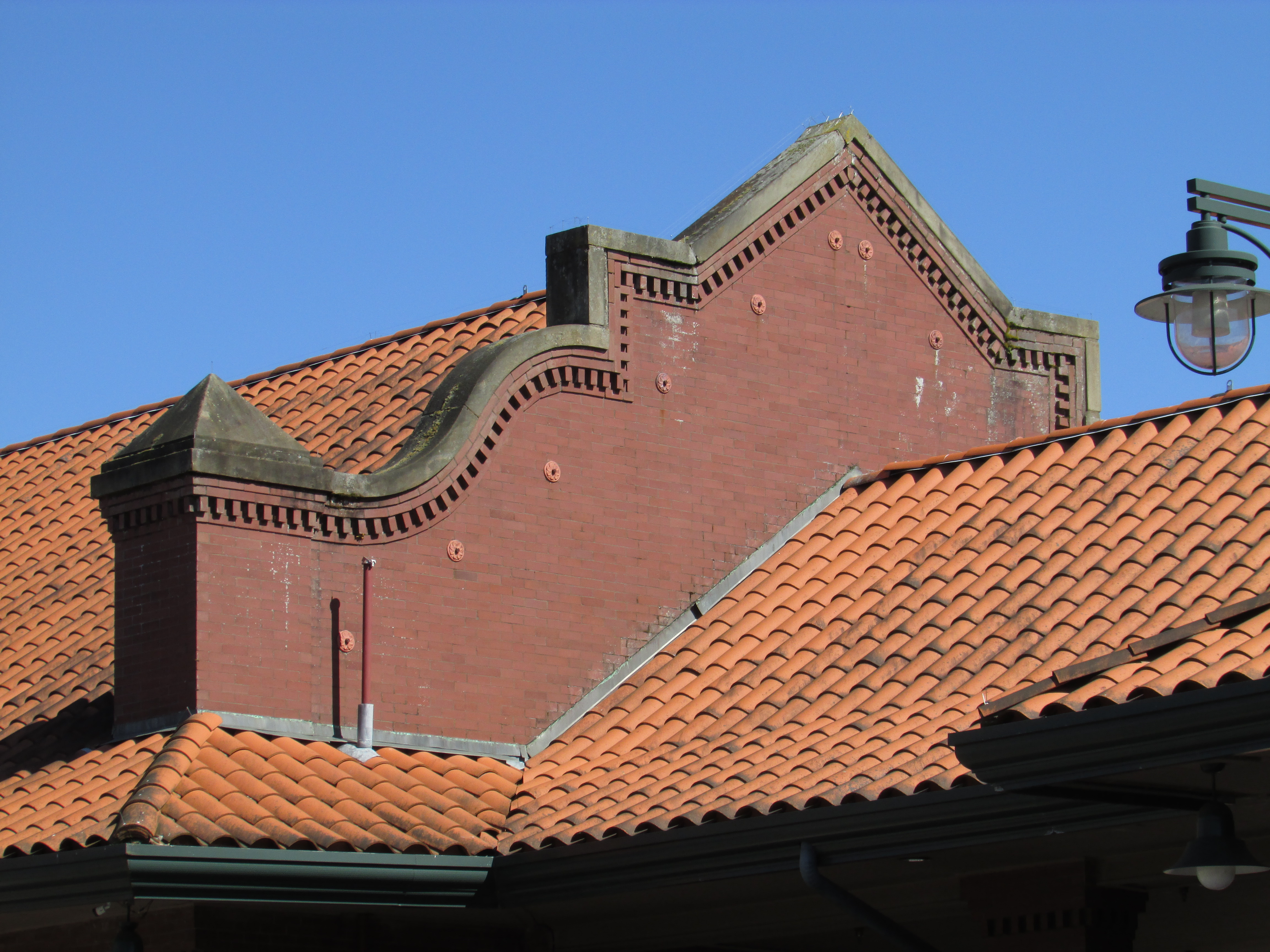
Gable, 2019

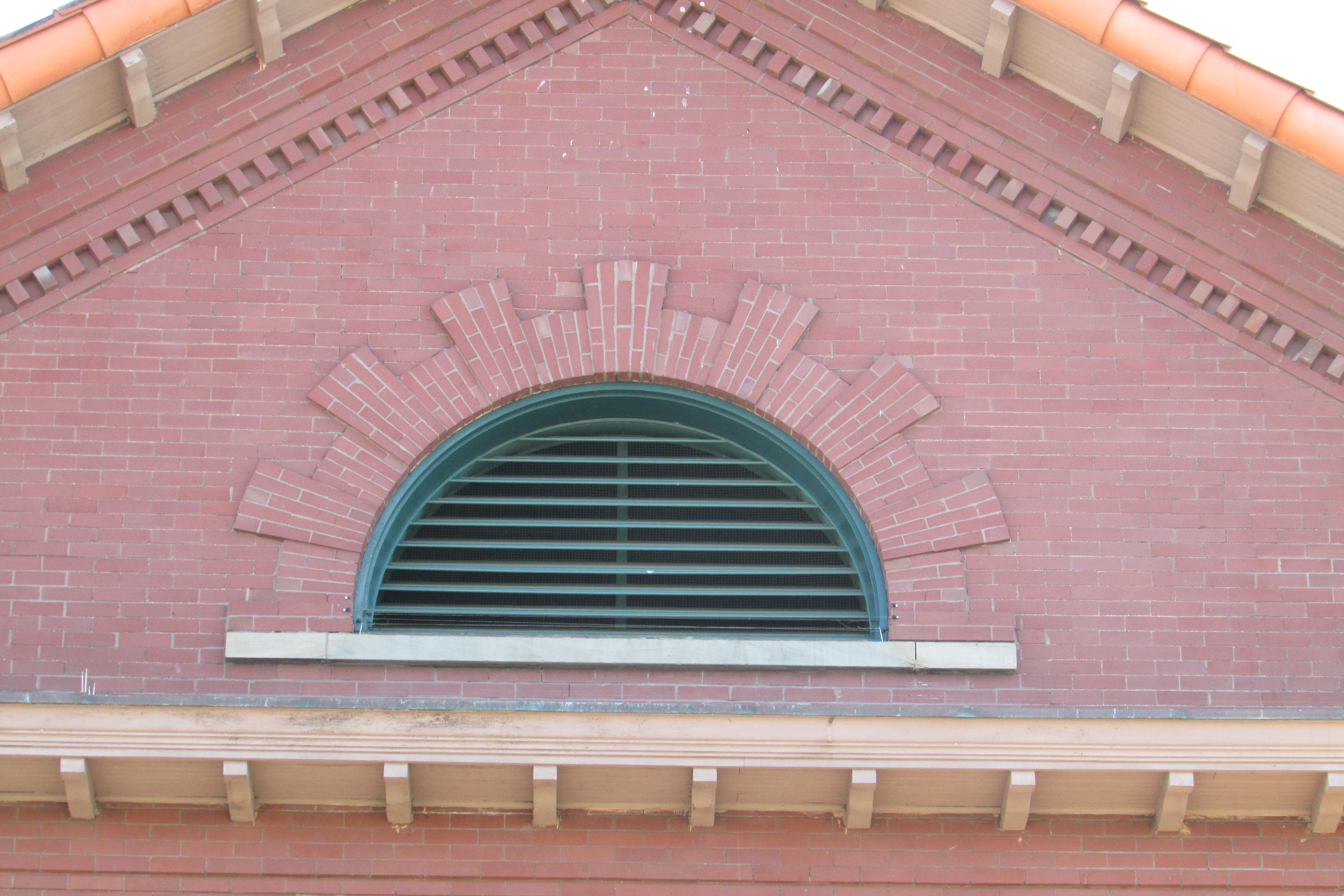
Louver, 2019

=== Interior ===
The terminal measures approximately 40 ft × 160 ft (12 m × 49 m). The space contains a baggage room, offices, a passenger waiting area, restrooms, and ticket booths. Additional offices are located on a second floor, accessible by a "massive and ornate wood stairway". The north and south exits to the annexes are outlined with parapets featuring concrete coping and brick dentils. Additional brick parapets are located in the corners of the terminal space. Doors to the lobby include transom windows. A masonry sill and a top brick dentil frame the windows.

The lobby is 30 feet (9.1 m) tall which initially contained a chandelier. The ceiling is in a dome-arch detail and supported by classical Greek-style columns. Molding located below the arch is painted with an intricate pattern and is considered mostly original. The ceiling, for a time, was obscured when a false ceiling was installed; the archways between the annexes were also obscured due to the alteration. Original benches, doors, and trim are oak. An original drinking fountain, as well as brass fixtures on the doors, remain. The lower portion of the interior walls are sheathed in white tile and wainscotting coated in enamel paint.

A terrazzo tile floor, noted to be off-white and gray in color, was original to the station (Note: Local reporting around the 1912 dedication mentions the flooring as "tarruza".) and was replaced with a similar terrazzo tile during the 1990s restoration of the station. (Note: Descriptions of the original terrazzo tile floor during the 1994-2002 restoration fluctuate as to whether the floor was restored or replaced. See sources throughout the article for the discrepancy.)

At the time of the NRHP nomination, original light fixtures remained in a hallway between the passenger waiting area and the bathrooms. The original 19 ft × 24 ft (5.8 m × 7.3 m) ladies restroom was listed in 1912 to contain such amenities as a drinking fountain, a large plate glass mirror, rocking chairs, and a writing table. A men's smoking room on the opposite side of the hallway also contained a similar table.

The north annex contains a radio room and office space; the southern section is home to the station's freight office. In 2002, the building was noted to still be heated by a boiler and radiator system. A heating plant was originally installed to warm the depot.

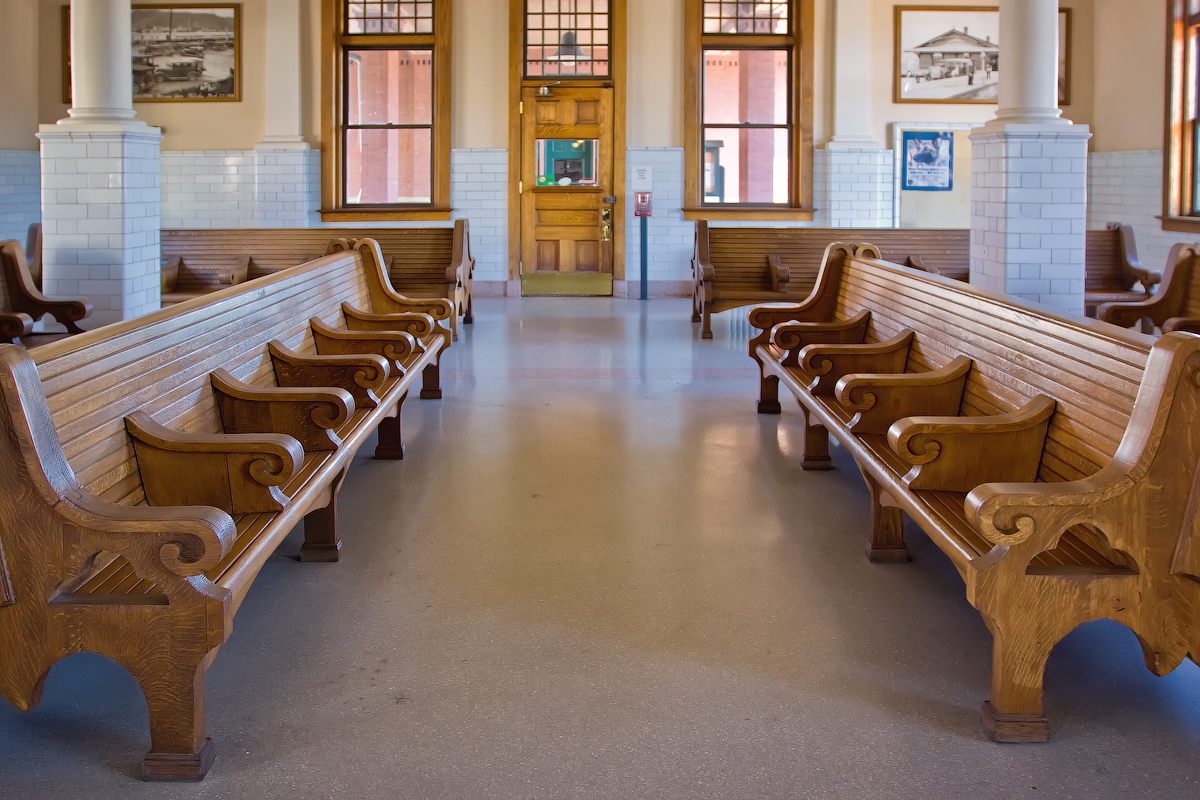
Main terminal, 2011

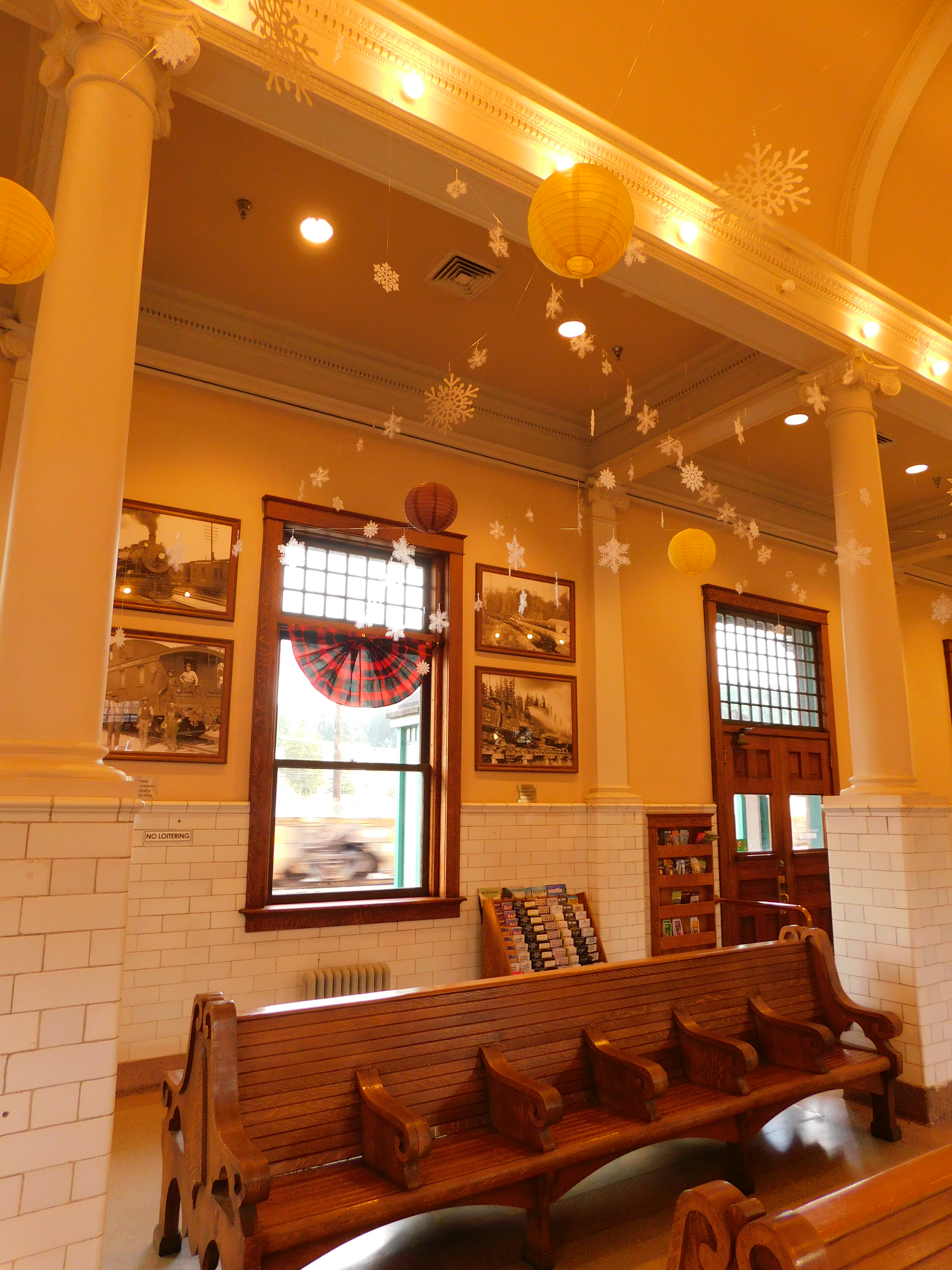
View towards platform doors, 2025

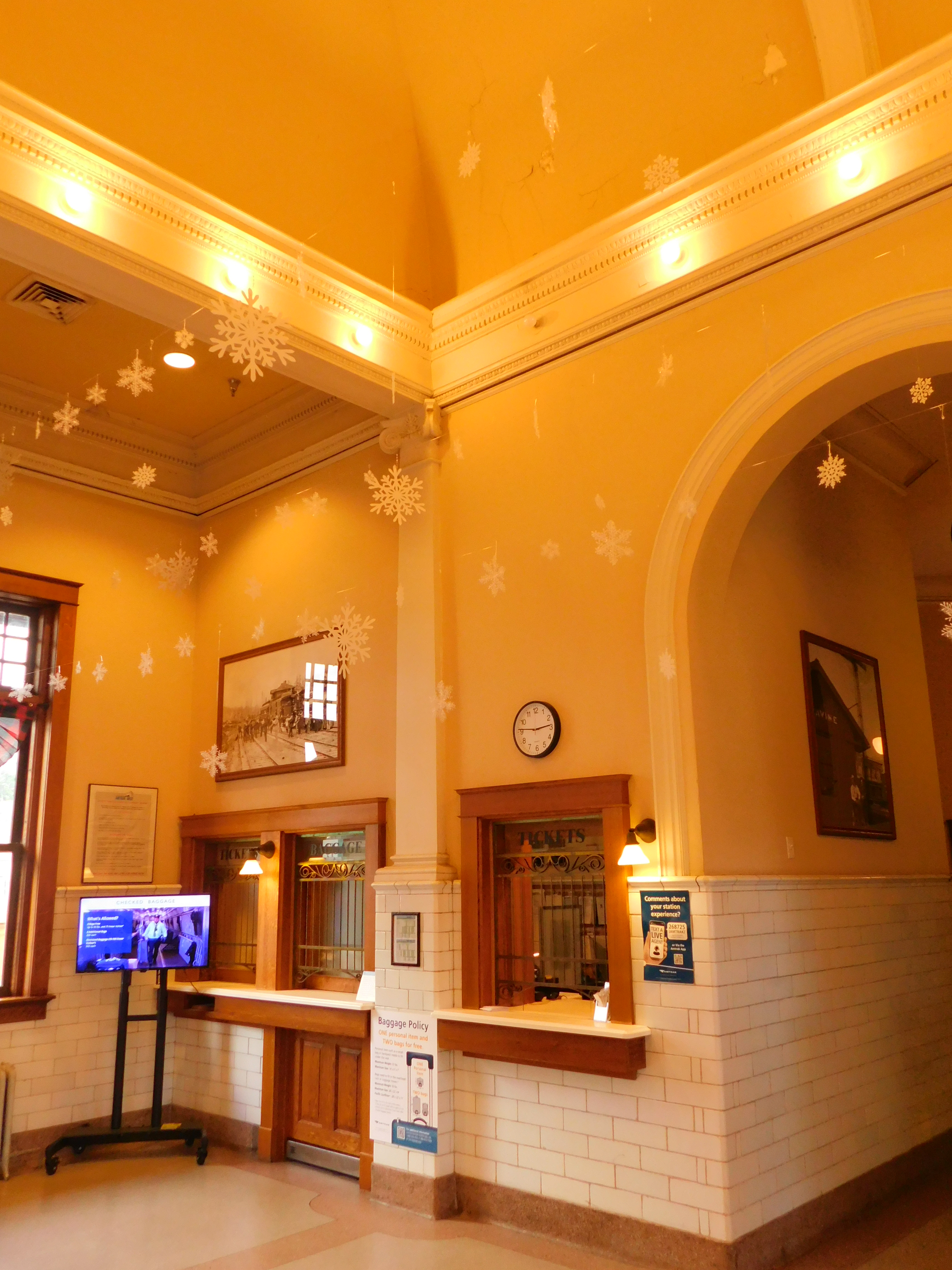
Ticket office, 2025

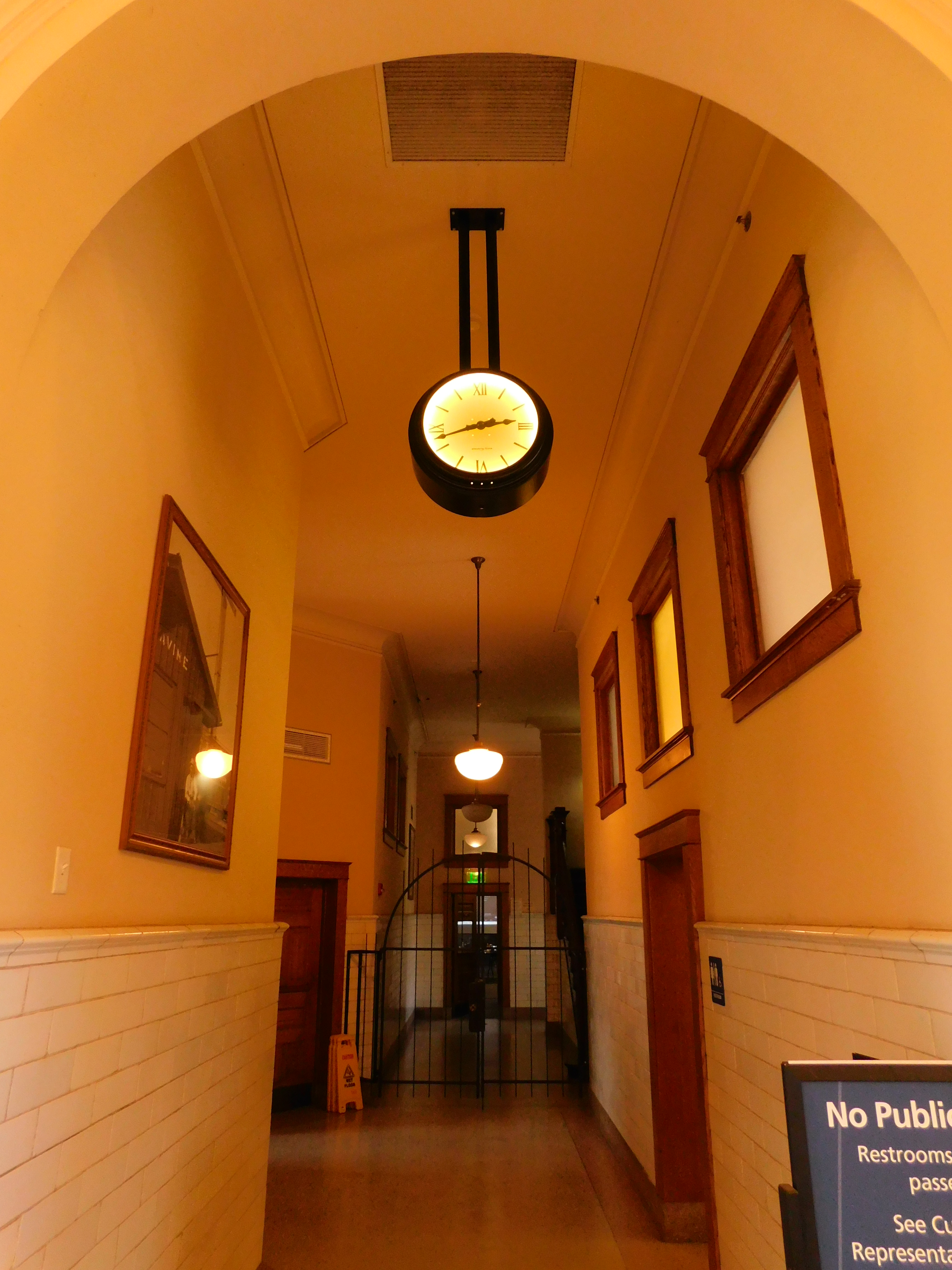
South hallway, 2025

=== Remodels and restorations ===
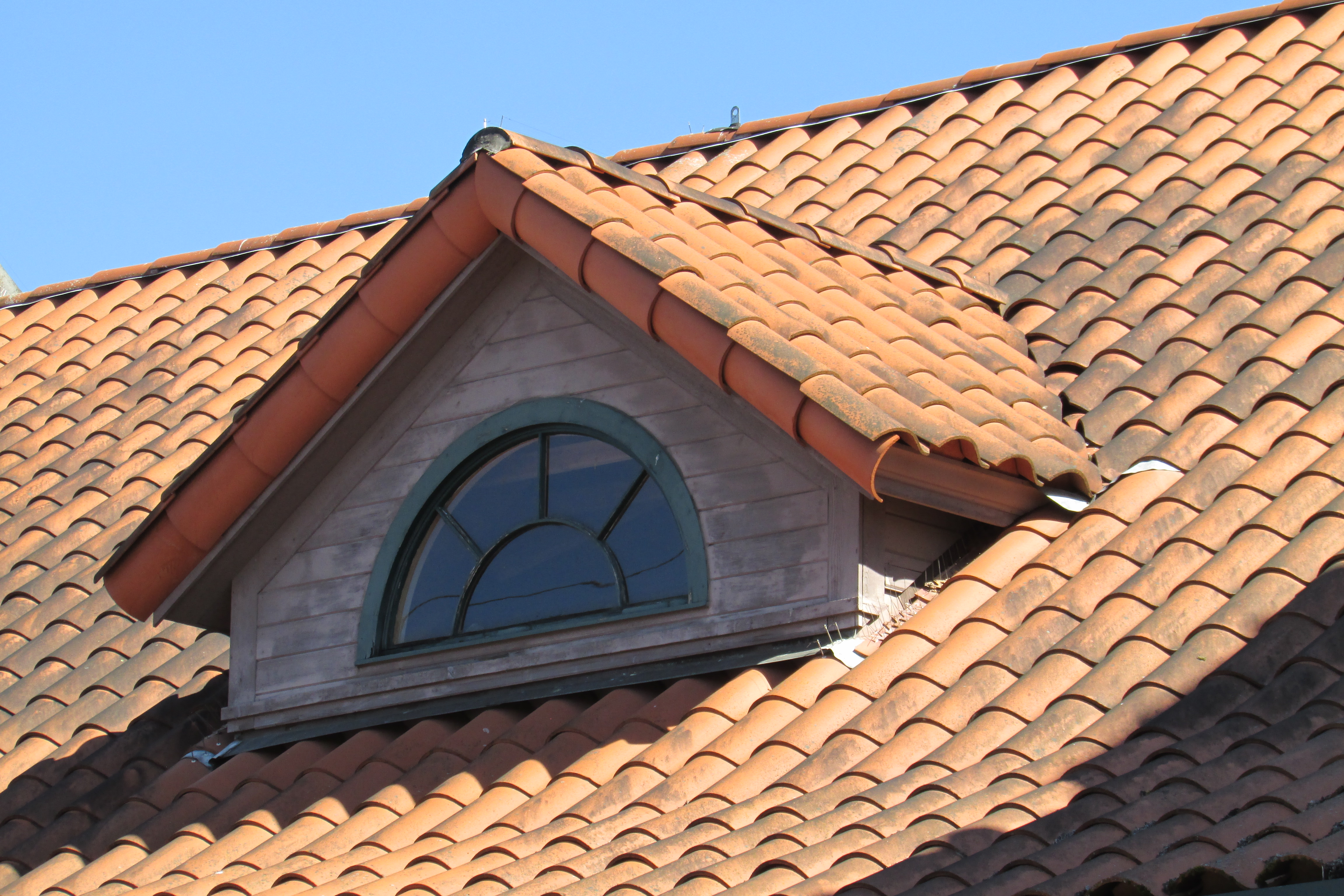
Dormer, 2019

The first noted restoration was the removal of dormers in 1925. The gabled features, which contained windows, were located on the main terminal roof. The original phone booth was upgraded to multiple private booths in 1929. The telegraph office was moved from the second floor of the terminal to the ground floor ticket booth in January 1932.

In 1953, a wire bird cage to capture pigeons was built atop the depot. The birds has long been considered a nuisance to the station, requiring consistent maintenance to repair damages done by the flock. The pigeons were known to gather discarded cigarettes, some still lit, causing small fires in the eaves where their nests were built.

The first modernization of the depot began in 1961. During the project, an acoustic tile ceiling was installed, shortening the height of the main terminal to 18 feet (5.5 m). The ticket booth was relocated to the northeast section of the passenger lobby; the freight offices shifted to the north of the waiting area. A concrete platform replaced a wooden plank loading dock at the warehouse portion of the station. Additional redecorations of the interior, as well as upgrades to the heating system, were also undertaken.

Due to deterioration, the depot was planned for a restoration in 1974. Under orders from the city to repair the "long in disrepair" structure "or else", Burlington Northern planned to build a shopping plaza in the main terminal.

A restoration of Centralia Union Station began in 1994 in three phases; the project was not fully completed until 2002. The initially estimated $1.2 million effort, funded mostly by WSDOT, included the stabilization of the structure from further deterioration, the restoration of previously removed roof dormers, installation of a new tile roof, re-pointing the brick exterior, upgraded utilities, and new parking lots at each end of the building. The passenger walkway was also fenced as an additional safety measure next to the train tracks. Additional funds were added to the project in September 1994 to cover costs associated with supplemental planning, such as landscaping and additions included in the original renovation proposal. By 1996, costs increased to near $2.0 million.

The $1.3 million second phase started in 2000 and focused on interior work. The passenger lobby was restored, with the installation of new floors and restoration of existing mill work and brass fittings. The drop ceiling that covered the domed ceiling of the terminal was removed. Additionally, renovations were undertaken to the Amtrak ticket office, baggage room, freight room, and express building. The HVAC system was also upgraded. An elevator was installed and approximately 4 tonnes (3.9 long tons; 4.4 short tons) of pigeon waste was removed from the attic space.

The architectural firm responsible for planning the restoration, Easters and Kittle of Issaquah, were awarded the 2003 Washington State's Historic Preservation Officer's Award for Special Achievement in Historic Preservation. The Washington Department of Community, Trade and Economic Development recognized the revitalization efforts the same year, honoring the city and the depot with an Outstanding Design Project award.

=== Former features ===
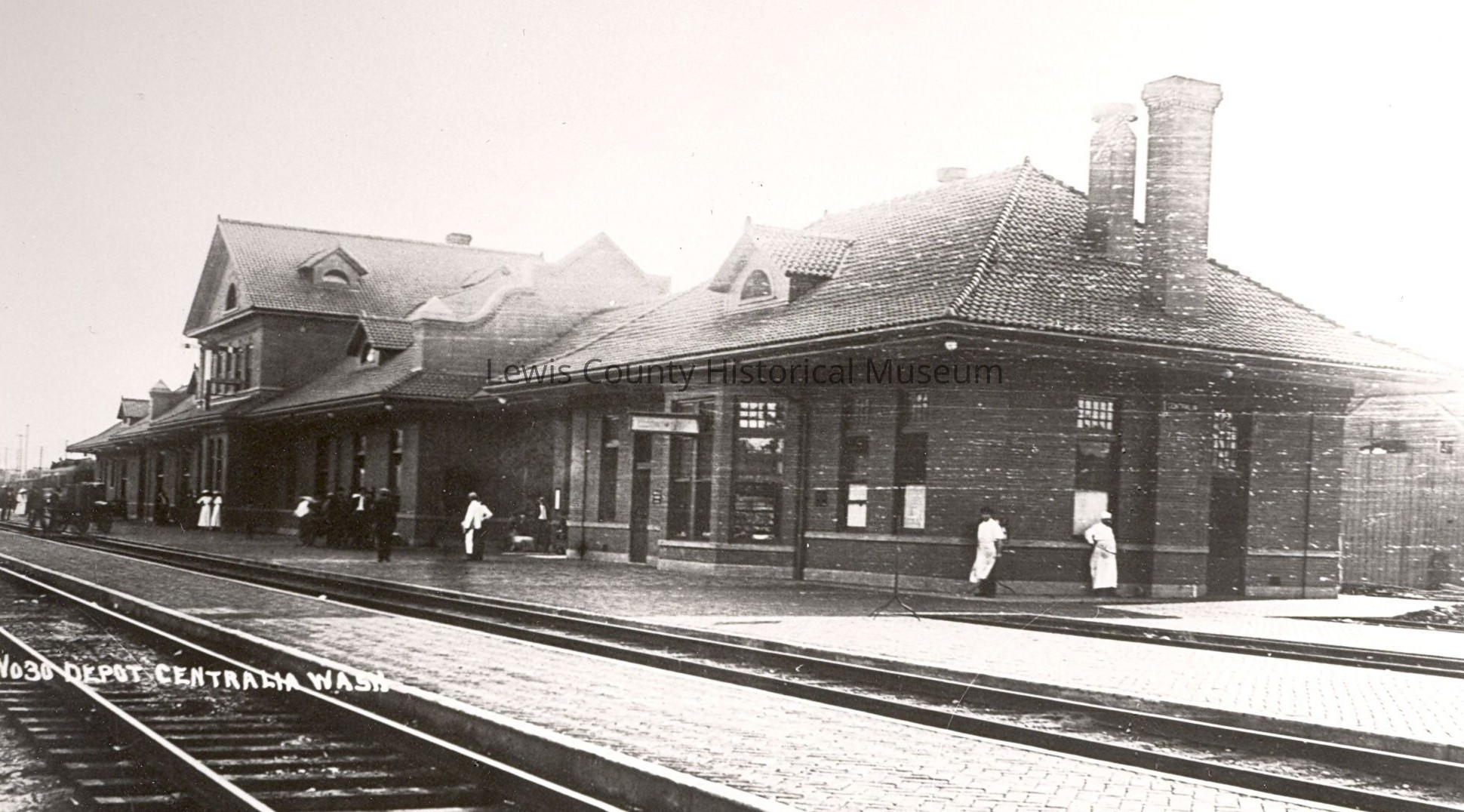
Union Depot Cafe, ca. 1920s

The Union Depot Cafe, known as the "door that was never locked", once operated at the depot since near the beginning of its opening. The diner was closed under orders by Northern Pacific in March 1933. The grounds may have contained a water tank and a separate freight house near the roundhouse.

== See also ==
- Centralia Railroaders, minor league baseball team
- Olympic Club Hotel
