= Vancouver station =

Vancouver station may refer to one of the following:

- Waterfront station (Vancouver), an intermodal (formerly CPR) train station in Vancouver, British Columbia, Canada
- Pacific Central Station, a VIA Rail (formerly CNR) train station in Vancouver, British Columbia, Canada
- Vancouver station (Washington), an Amtrak station in Vancouver, Washington, United States
