= Bingen–White Salmon station =

Passenger rail station in Washington, United States

Bingen–White Salmon, WA
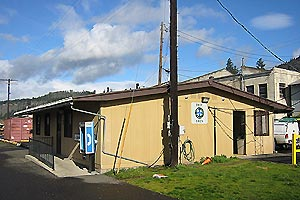

General information
- Location: 313 West Depot Street; Bingen, Washington; United States
- Coordinates: 45.7151°N 121.4688°W
- Owner: BNSF Railway
- Line: BNSF Fallbridge Subdivision
- Platforms: 1 side platform
- Tracks: 2
- Connections: Mount Adams Transportation Service

Construction
- Parking: Yes
- Accessible: Yes

Other information
- Station code: Amtrak: BNG

History
- Opened: December 15, 1907 (Portland and Seattle Railway); October 25, 1981
- Rebuilt: 1992

Passengers
- FY 2025: 3,455 (Amtrak)

Services
Preceding station	Amtrak	Following station
Vancouver, Washington toward Portland	Empire Builder	Wishram toward Chicago
Former services
Preceding station	Spokane, Portland and Seattle Railway	Following station
Underwood toward Portland	Main Line	Lyle toward Spokane: Great Northern or Northern Pacific
Location

Bingen–White Salmon is a train station in Bingen, Washington served by Amtrak. The unstaffed station is part of a larger BNSF dispatch center located one block south of Stuben Street (SR 14) in Bingen. The building is orangish-yellow in color.

Rail service through Bingen and nearby White Salmon began on December 15, 1907, when regular service began on the Portland and Seattle Railway. The station was named after both Bingen and nearby White Salmon by a court order in 1910, and formally introduced in 1930 by the Spokane, Portland and Seattle Railway. The current station was built in 1992.
