= Wishram station =

Passenger rail station in Washington, United States

Wishram, WA
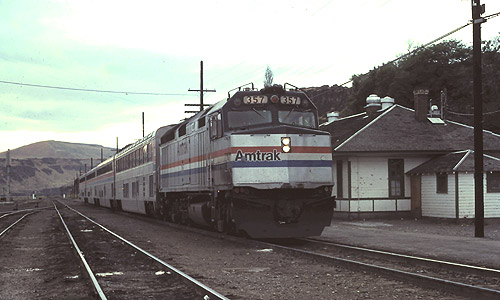
- Eastbound Empire Builder at Wishram station, July 1982

General information
- Location: 1 Railroad Avenue; Wishram, Washington; United States
- Coordinates: 45°39′27″N 120°57′59″W
- Owner: BNSF Railway
- Line: BNSF Fallbridge Subdivision
- Platforms: 1 side platform
- Tracks: 2

Construction
- Parking: Yes

Other information
- Station code: Amtrak: WIH

History
- Opened: December 15, 1907 (Portland and Seattle Railway); October 25, 1981 (Amtrak)

Passengers
- FY 2025: 1,546 (Amtrak)

Services
Preceding station	Amtrak	Following station
Bingen–White Salmon toward Portland	Empire Builder	Pasco toward Chicago
Former services
Preceding station	Spokane, Portland and Seattle Railway	Following station
Avery toward Portland	Main Line	Timm toward Spokane: Great Northern or Northern Pacific
Location

Wishram is a train station in Wishram, Washington, served by Amtrak's Empire Builder line. The station consists of a platform adjacent to a modern prefabricated building that contains BNSF offices. Although Wishram is one of the smallest communities served by Amtrak, it is an important gateway to the scenic recreational opportunities offered by the Columbia River. Amtrak does not provide ticketing or baggage services at this facility, which is served by two daily trains. The station, parking, track, and platforms are owned by BNSF Railway.

The first passenger trains to serve Wishram began on December 15, 1907, with the opening of the Portland and Seattle Railway.
