= Vancouver station (Washington) =

Train station in Vancouver, Washington, US

Vancouver, WA
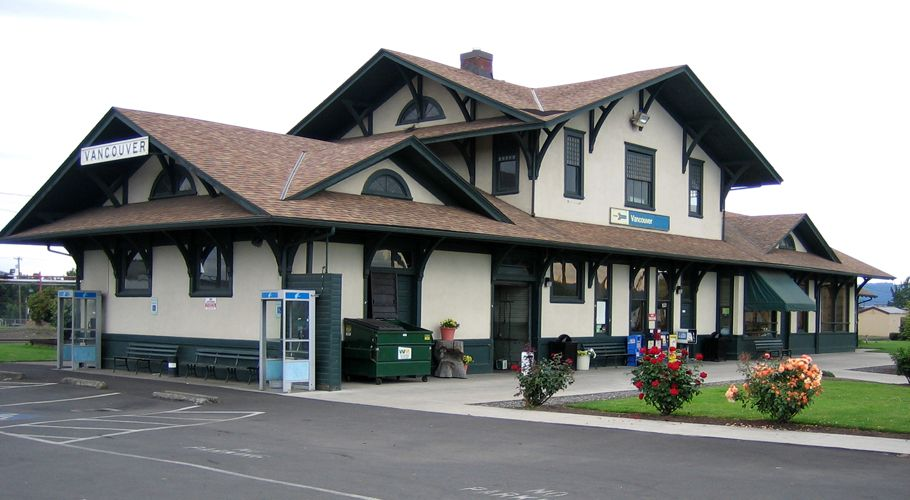
- Vancouver station in June 2006

General information
- Location: 1301 West 11th Street; Vancouver, Washington; United States
- Coordinates: 45°37′44″N 122°41′11″W
- Owner: City of Vancouver
- Lines: BNSF Fallbridge Subdivision and Seattle Subdivision
- Platforms: 2 side platforms
- Tracks: 4

Construction
- Parking: 10 short term and 45 long term spaces
- Accessible: Yes

Other information
- Station code: Amtrak: VAN

History
- Opened: 1908
- Rebuilt: 1988 (partial); 2008 (complete)

Passengers
- FY 2025: 145,650 (Amtrak)

Services
Preceding station	Amtrak	Following station
Portland toward Eugene	Amtrak Cascades	Kelso toward Vancouver, British Columbia
Portland toward Los Angeles	Coast Starlight	Kelso toward Seattle
Portland Terminus	Empire Builder	Bingen–White Salmon toward Chicago
Former services
Preceding station	Amtrak	Following station
Kelso toward Seattle	Pioneer Discontinued in 1997	Portland toward Chicago
Joint Great Northern/Northern Pacific/ Union Pacific service
Preceding station	Great Northern Railway	Following station
Portland Terminus	Portland–Seattle Line	Felida toward Seattle
Preceding station	Northern Pacific Railway	Following station
Portland Terminus	Portland–Seattle Line	Felida toward Seattle
Preceding station	Union Pacific Railroad	Following station
Portland Terminus	Portland–Seattle Line	Felida toward Seattle
Preceding station	Spokane, Portland and Seattle Railway	Following station
North Portland toward Portland	Main Line	Image toward Spokane: Great Northern or Northern Pacific
Location

Vancouver station is an Amtrak intercity rail station in Vancouver, Washington, United States. The station is served by four daily round trips of the Cascades, the daily Coast Starlight, and the daily Portland section of the Empire Builder.

Vancouver station is located in a wye between the Fallbridge Subdivision and Seattle Subdivision, just north Burlington Northern Railroad Bridge 9.6 over the Columbia River. A side platform and narrow island platform on the west side of the station building serve the Cascades and Coast Starlight on the Seattle Subdivision, while a side platform to the east serves the Empire Builder on the Fallbridge Subdivision.

Designed by Kennewick-based architect Francis A. Swingle, the station was constructed in 1908 by the Spokane, Portland and Seattle Railway (a subsidiary of the Northern Pacific Railroad) to serve trains using the new Columbia River bridge. Service was transferred to Amtrak in 1971. A partial restoration of the station building took place in 1988, followed by a full renovation in 2008–09.
