= Fallbridge Subdivision =

Railway line in Oregon and Washington State

The Fallbridge Subdivision is a railway line in southern Washington running about 229.7 miles (369.7 km) along the Columbia River from Pasco to Vancouver, then south to Portland, OR. It is operated by BNSF Railway and is considered part of the Northern Transcon.

The Portland section of Amtrak's Empire Builder, Trains 27 and 28, utilize this line servicing stops in Wishram, WA; Bingen, WA; Vancouver, WA; and Portland, OR, this particular line sees around 30-40 trains daily.
