= Portland Union Station =

Train station in Portland, Oregon, U.S.

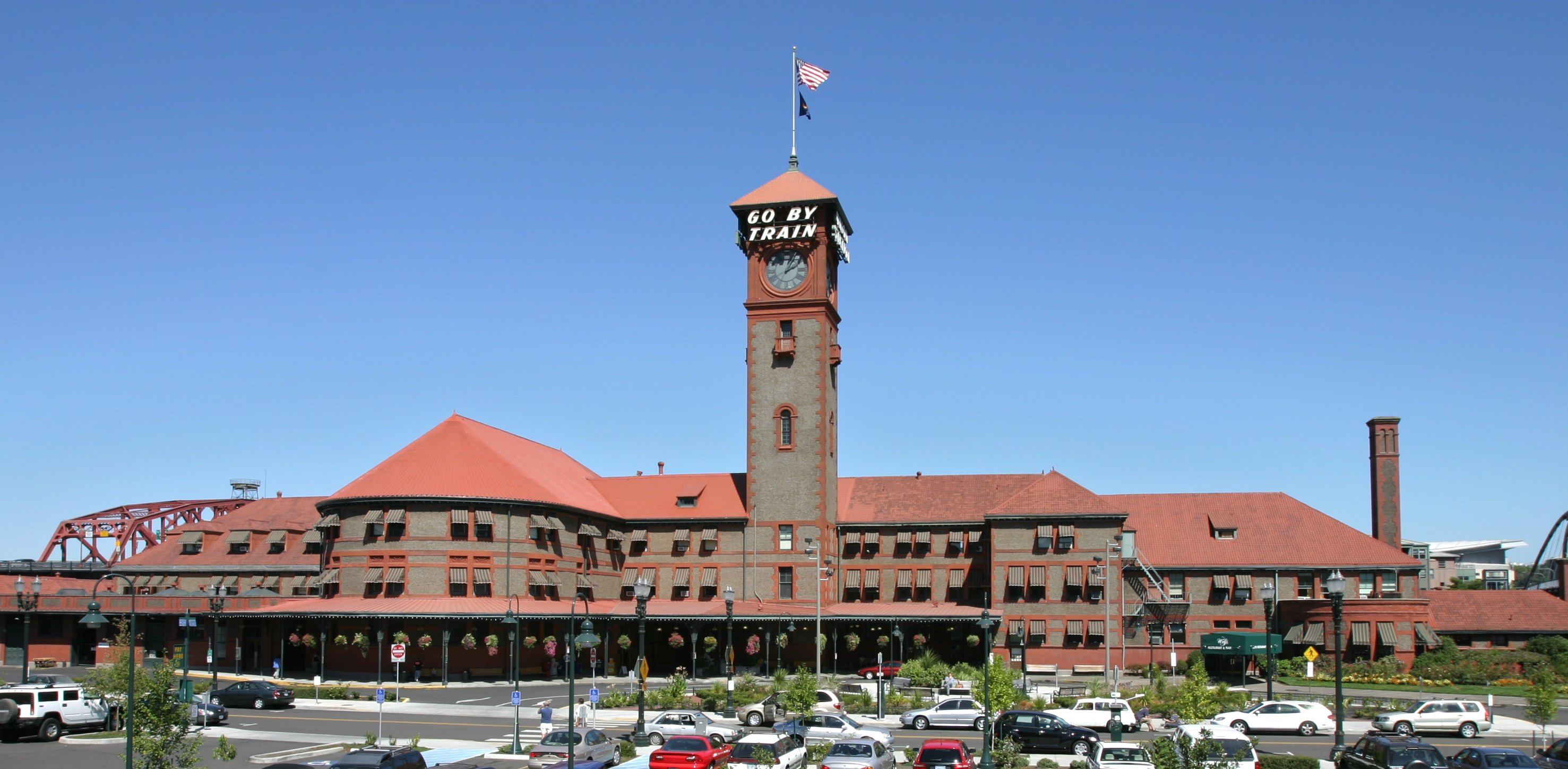

General information
- Location: 800 Northwest Sixth Avenue; Portland, Oregon; United States
- Coordinates: 45.529°N 122.6768°W
- Owner: City of Portland (Prosper Portland)
- Lines: Fallbridge Subdivision; Portland Subdivision
- Platforms: 1 side, 2 island platforms
- Tracks: 5
- Connections: MAX Light Rail: Orange Line Yellow Line at Union Station/Northwest 6th & Hoyt and Union Station/Northwest 5th & Glisan stations Portland Streetcar Transit bus services: Central Oregon Breeze, FlixBus, Pacific Crest Lines, POINT, TriMet, The Wave

Construction
- Parking: Yes
- Cycle facilities: Yes
- Accessible: Yes

Other information
- Station code: Amtrak: PDX

History
- Opened: February 14, 1896; 130 years ago
- Rebuilt: 1996; 30 years ago

Passengers
- FY 2025: 586,257 (Amtrak)

Services
Preceding station	Amtrak	Following station
Oregon City toward Eugene	Amtrak Cascades	Vancouver, Washington toward Vancouver, British Columbia
Salem toward Los Angeles	Coast Starlight	Vancouver, Washington toward Seattle
Terminus	Empire Builder	Vancouver, Washington toward Chicago
Preceding station	Portland Streetcar	Following station
NW 10th & Johnson One-way operation	A Loop transfer at NW 9th & Lovejoy	N Weidler & Ross Next clockwise
Former services
Preceding station	Amtrak	Following station
Vancouver, Washington toward Seattle	Pioneer	Cascade Locks 1981–1988 toward Chicago
Vancouver, Washington toward Seattle	Pioneer	Hood River toward Chicago
East Milwaukie toward Eugene	Willamette Valley	Terminus
Preceding station	Union Pacific Railroad	Following station
Terminus	Portland – Granger	Graham toward Granger
Joint Great Northern/Northern Pacific/ Union Pacific service
Terminus	Portland–Seattle Line	North Portland toward Seattle
Preceding station	Great Northern Railway	Following station
Terminus	Portland–Seattle Line	North Portland toward Seattle
Preceding station	Northern Pacific Railway	Following station
Terminus	Portland–Seattle Line	North Portland toward Seattle
Preceding station	Southern Pacific Railroad	Following station
East Morrison Street toward Oakland Pier	Shasta Route	Terminus
East Morrison Street toward Corvallis	Red Electric Lines	Terminus
East Morrison Street toward Tillamook	Tillamook – Portland	Terminus
Preceding station	Spokane, Portland and Seattle Railway	Following station
Terminus	Main Line	St. Johns toward Spokane: Great Northern or Northern Pacific
- Union Station
- U.S. National Register of Historic Places
- Area: 7 acres (2.8 ha)
- Built: 1890-96
- Architect: Van Brunt & Howe
- Architectural style: Romanesque Revival
- NRHP reference No.: 75001595
- Added to NRHP: August 6, 1975
Location

Portland Union Station is a train station in Portland, Oregon, United States, situated near the western shore of the Willamette River in Old Town Chinatown. It serves as an intermediate stop for Amtrak's Cascades and Coast Starlight routes and, along with King Street Station in Seattle, is one of two western termini of the Empire Builder. The station is a major transport hub for the Portland metropolitan area with connections to MAX Light Rail, the Portland Streetcar, and local and intercity bus services. The station building contains Wilf's Restaurant & Bar on the ground level and offices on the upper floors. It also has Amtrak's first Metropolitan Lounge on the West Coast, which is reserved for first-class sleeping car and business-class passengers.

Southeast of the station, the tracks make a sharp turn and cross the river on the historic Steel Bridge. To the northwest, they follow the river, passing through rail yards before crossing the river again on the Burlington Northern Railroad Bridge 5.1.

The station is owned by Prosper Portland, the city's economic development agency.

== Services ==
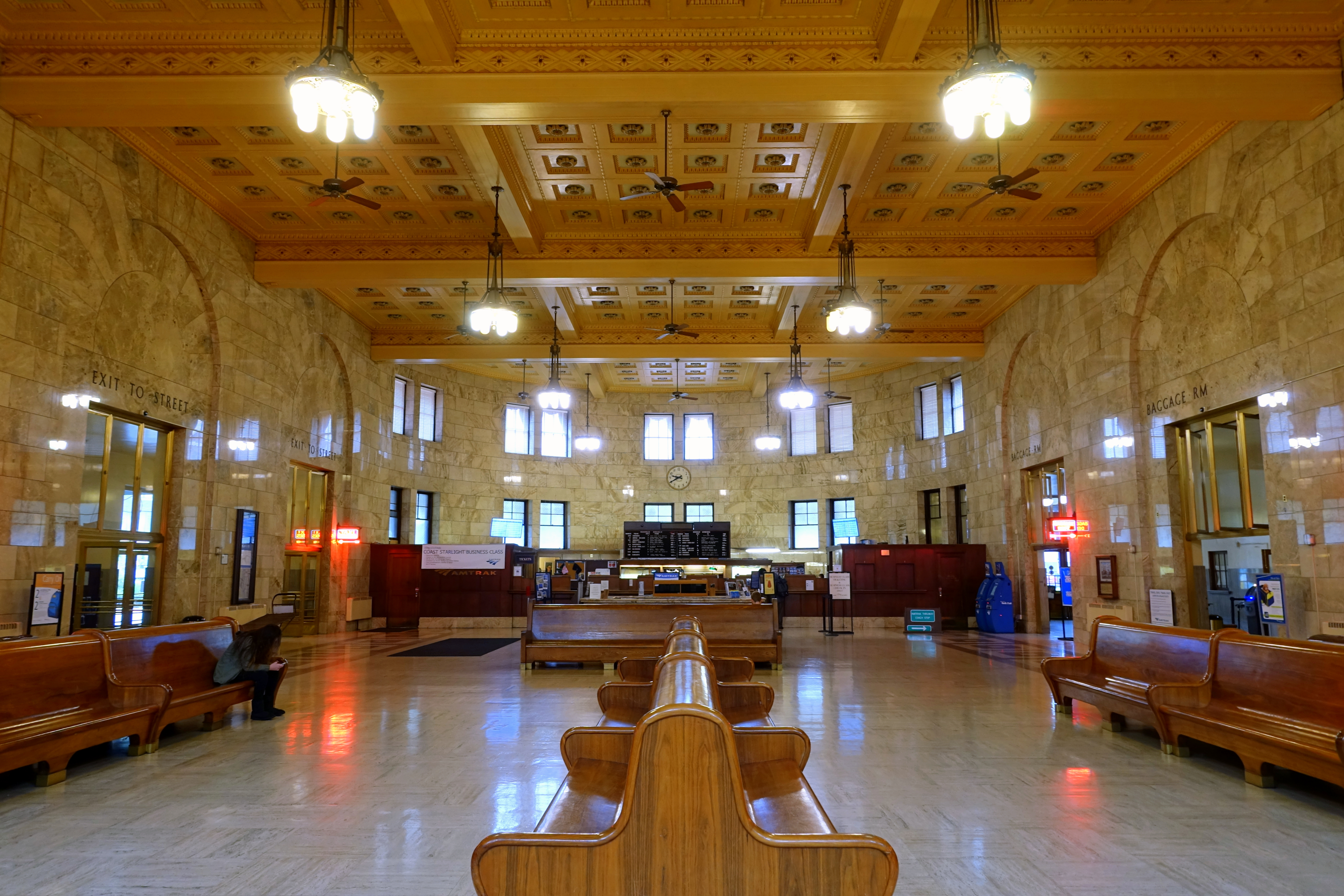
The main atrium waiting room at Union Station

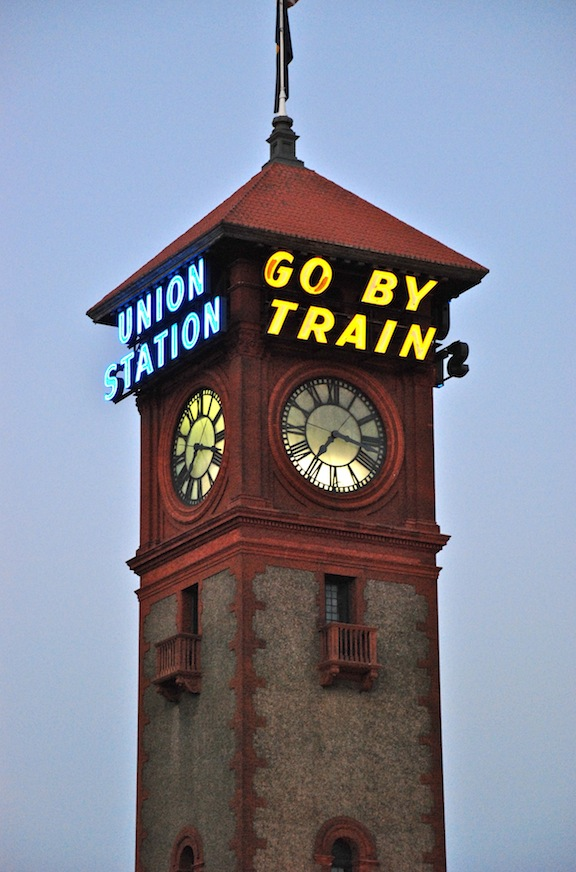
The clock tower at dusk. The neon signs were added in 1948.

Union Station serves as a major intermodal transportation hub for Portland and Oregon. Union Station connects to TriMet MAX Green and Yellow Line trains at the nearby Union Station/Northwest 6th & Hoyt and Union Station/Northwest 5th & Glisan stations, as well as local bus service provided by TriMet. Located at the northern end of TriMet's transit mall, Union Station is also only a short walk to both lines of the Portland Streetcar, in the Pearl District.

The station is one of two western termini for the Empire Builder, Amtrak's major long-distance train to the Pacific Northwest. The train splits at Spokane, with one section continuing to Portland by way of the Columbia River Gorge and the other continuing to Seattle. It is also a stop for the Seattle-Los Angeles Coast Starlight, Amtrak's long-distance West Coast train. It serves as the southern terminus for two daily Cascades trains from Vancouver, British Columbia and four daily Cascades trains from Seattle, and the northern terminus for two Cascades trains from Eugene.

As of 2018, Union Station is the fifth-busiest Amtrak station in the Western United States (behind Los Angeles, Sacramento, Seattle and Emeryville) and the 21st busiest overall.

=== Bus connections ===
Portland's former Greyhound bus terminal is the next building to the south, having moved to the building (from a location in the center of downtown) in 1985. Greyhound vacated the facility in September 2019 in favor of a curbside pickup location nearby.

== Station details ==
Union Station is situated near the western bank of the Willamette River in downtown Portland's Old Town Chinatown. The site is bound by Northwest Glisan, Hoyt, and Irving streets to the south; Northwest Broadway Street and Station Way to the west; Northwest Overton Street and Naito Parkway to the north; and Northwest Ironside Terrace and industrial and commercial zones to the east.

== History ==
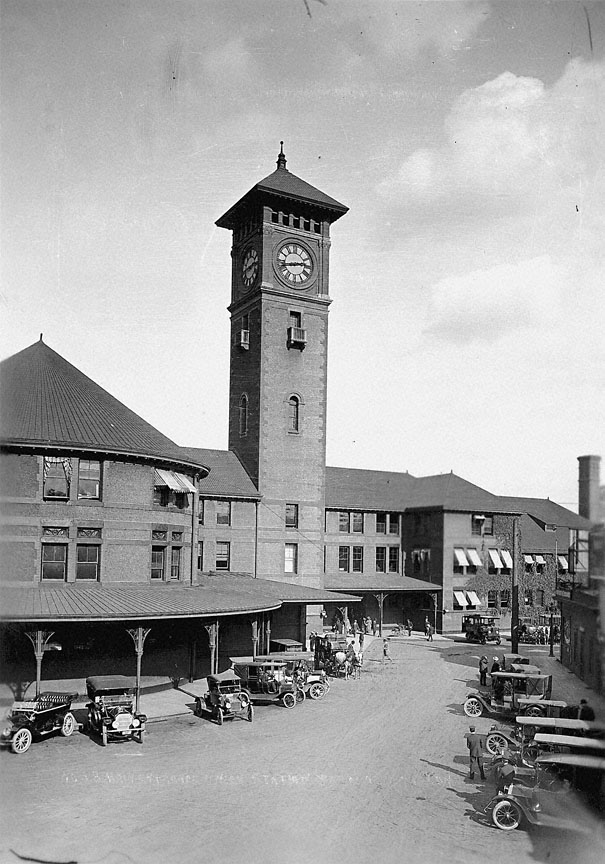
Union Station in 1913

The initial design for the station was created in 1882 by McKim, Mead & White. Had the original plan been built, the station would have been the largest train station in the world. A smaller plan was introduced by architects Van Brunt & Howe, and accepted in 1885. Construction of the station began in 1890. It was built by the firm of Wakefield and Bridges for the Northern Pacific Terminal Company at a cost of $300,000 ($11.6 million in 2025 adjusted for inflation), and opened on February 14, 1896. The roof is made of bright red metal roof tiles, with exposed detailed pressed red brick, grey sandstone trimmings, and pebbledash stucco masonry exterior. A feature was the projecting metal canopies with cast iron support posts at the entryway. The annex, also constructed in 1896 also by Wakefield and Bridges, contained the freestanding steam plant, storerooms, telegraph office, laundry, and police-room. At the Depot's opening in 1896, the yards in front of the station contained six parallel railroad tracks. Passengers gained entry to the tracks by passing through a long, narrow, enclosed one-story shed appended to the east side of the station. The tracks remained unsheltered for almost 10 years.

The track shelters were built in response to the expected increase in travellers arriving by rail to attend the 1905 Lewis and Clark Exposition in Portland.

The signature piece of the structure is the 150-foot-tall Romanesque Revival clock tower with its four-sided 1898 Seth Thomas eight-day pendulum clock, has become one of the most iconic and recognizable features of the station. Each of the clock faces is 12 feet in diameter, with a minute hand 6 feet long and an hour hand 5 feet long. The clock has a 14 foot pendulum and 1,000 pounds of counterweight that drops almost 50 feet over 7 days. It is wound every seven days. Neon signs were added to the tower in 1948. The signs read "Go by Train" on the northeast and southwest sides and "Union Station" on the northwest and southeast sides.

The nearby Interlocking Tower, also called the “VC tower” was built in 1914 to replace an earlier, wooden, building at this same location that served the same function related to the complex track switching function necessary for the operation of the station-related trackage. Construction was likely related to improvements required to changes in operation after the Terminal Company granted use of Tracks 1 and 2 to the Oregon and California Railroad and Southern Pacific railroad. The building is a small two-story brick volume with a decorative parapet, glazed terra cotta or white “face brick” detailing remains virtually unaltered on its exterior. The Interlocking Tower at Union Station is believed to be the only remaining building of its type in Oregon, and one of just five in the western United States. Now leased to Tri-Met, the original interlocking function ended on November 5, 1997. This interlocking tower was added to the National Register of Historic Places form for Portland Union Station in a 2015 update.

In 1925, a pedestrian bridge connecting the station to the adjacent Broadway Bridge was opened.

Dissatisfaction with the lack of a clear, formal entry and confusing circulation patterns and dramatically increased passenger load were factors that led to the need to remodel. In 1927, the prestigious Portland architectural firm of A.E. Doyle was hired by the Terminal Rail Company to remodel the station. Pietro Belluschi, a young designer with little architectural training at the time, was put in charge of the remodel. With input from Southern Pacific, Union Pacific and Northern Pacific, the owners of the Terminal Rail Company, the drawings were finished in 1929. Major changes included: structural, functional and formal reordering of the main waiting room (including removing interior cast-iron columns) and associated public spaces; reorganizing the entry and exit sequences from the street and tracks; and functional and formal reorganization of the wing between the restaurant dining room and the main hall. Dormers were added to permit more natural light to enter the station. All new exterior finishes were closely matched to the old. Marble for the floors and walls was shipped from Italy for the remodeling. Little has changed in the station since this remodel in 1930.

In 1931, a pedestal was built in the station's courtyard and the Oregon Pony 1862-built locomotive was put on display in front of the station. The locomotive was moved to Cascade Locks Oregon in 1970.

In the early 1920's, ninety trains moved in or out of the station daily, 52 steam trains and 38 electrics; a train would arrive or depart about every 11 minutes. Expansion of service at Union Station related to the Spokane, Portland and Seattle Railway line in 1920s required significant changes to the building and track, and at its peak period of operation in the late 1940s Union Station had as many as 30 separate tracks, continuing east to Front Avenue. Over time, freight rail became less utilized as some businesses turned to trucks instead of railroads for shipment of goods.

In the years prior to Amtrak's assuming passenger operations on May 1, 1971, the Union Pacific's City of Portland ran to Portland from Chicago via Utah. Amtrak ran a successor train, the Pioneer, on a similar route to Portland until 1997.

The station was placed on the National Register of Historic Places in 1975.

The neon signs on the tower went dark in March 1971, because the railroads using it, Union Pacific, Burlington Northern and Southern Pacific, were preparing to transfer all of their remaining passenger services to Amtrak. For that reason, the station's then-owner, the Portland Terminal Railroad (itself jointly owned by those three railroads), decided to discontinue operation of the signs. In 1985, two local non-profit groups, the National Railway Historical Society (Pacific Northwest chapter) and the Oregon Association of Railway Passengers, led a fundraising campaign for public donations to enable the signs to be restored to operation. New neon tubes, in place of the old, were installed in July, and the signs were switched back on and returned to regular use in September 1985. The "Union Station" signs remain illuminated continuously, while the "Go by Train" signs flash on and off, in a sequence of "Go", then "Go by", then all three words, then off and on and repeat.

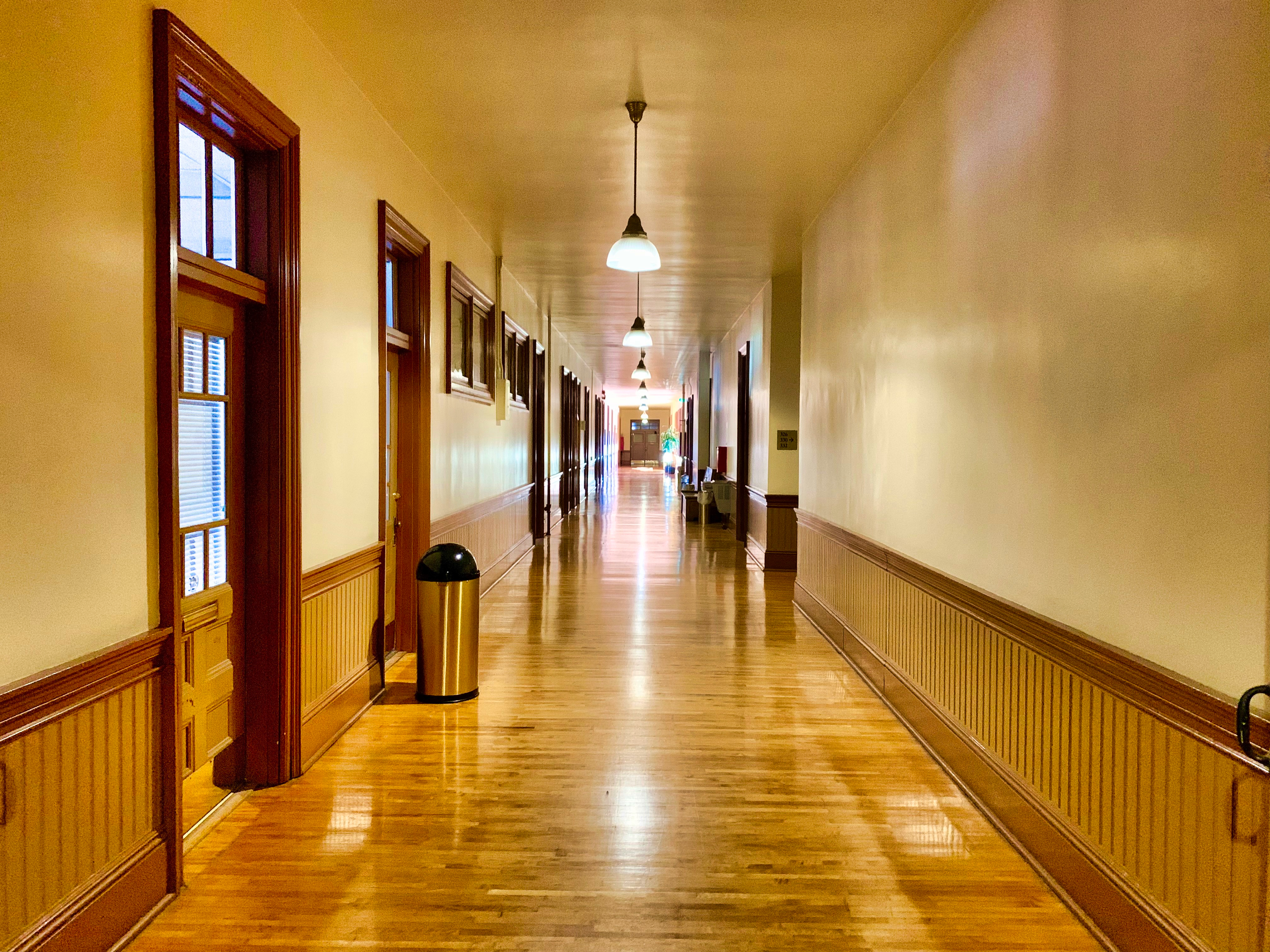
An interior hallway of the main station building

In 1987, ownership of the station and surrounding land was transferred from Portland Terminal Railroad to the Portland Development Commission (now Prosper Portland) as part of the Downtown/Waterfront urban-renewal district. Shortly afterwards, Union Station underwent a renovation. It was rededicated in 1996 for its 100th anniversary.

In 2004, the roadway in front of the station was reconfigured, providing a new connection to the northwest and a forecourt. In addition, the area is being redeveloped, including new housing where railroad tracks once were.

In 2023, Prosper Portland re-evaluated the alignment of its continued ownership of Portland Union Station with the economic development mission of the agency. They concluded that a sale to an entity with a transportation-focused mission was in the best long-term interest of stakeholders and the station itself. According to The Oregonian, talks to sell Union Station to Amtrak stalled in early 2024 and Prosper Portland was still seeking a buyer who would be able to finance seismic retrofitting and other upgrades that are estimated to cost $250 million.

== See also ==
- North Bank Depot – former train station located nearby
- Tourism in Portland, Oregon
