= Pacific Northwest Corridor =

Higher-speed rail corridor in the United States

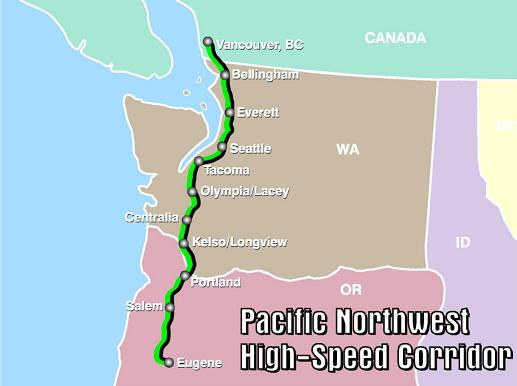
Corridor as designated by the Federal Railroad Administration

The Pacific Northwest Corridor or the Pacific Northwest Rail Corridor is one of eleven federally designated higher-speed rail corridors in the United States and Canada. The 466-mile (750 km) corridor extends from Eugene, Oregon, to Vancouver, British Columbia, via Portland, Oregon and Seattle, Washington, in the Pacific Northwest region. It was designated a high-speed rail corridor on October 20, 1992, as the one of five high-speed corridors in the Intermodal Surface Transportation Efficiency Act of 1991 (ISTEA).

== Current passenger service ==
The Pacific Northwest rail corridor is used by several Amtrak and local commuter rail services. Amtrak operates the Amtrak Cascades service over the length of the corridor, as well as the Coast Starlight from Seattle southward. The Empire Builder uses the corridor on short segments, via two sections in Seattle and Portland. BNSF Railway operates Sounder commuter rail for Sound Transit between Seattle and Tacoma, and Seattle and Everett.

== History ==
=== Development of the corridor ===
What became the Pacific Northwest Corridor was largely developed between the 1860s and the 1910s by the Southern Pacific Railroad, Northern Pacific Railway, and Great Northern Railway. Passenger service declined after the 1910s, but service was present on the whole corridor when Amtrak took over intercity passenger service in the United States on May 1, 1971.

==== Eugene–Portland ====
In 1866, the United States Congress granted land to a then-unnamed railway that would traverse the length of Willamette Valley south from Portland to the California state line. A railway company that would later become Ben Holladay's Oregon Central Railroad began laying track on the east side of the Willamette River in East Portland, Oregon, in April 1868. This railroad reorganized as the Oregon and California Railroad; it was completed as far south as Roseburg, Oregon, by December 1872. In 1887, the Oregon and California was purchased by the Southern Pacific Railroad (SP).

By 1940, the SP operated six daily round trips between Portland and Eugene: five long-distance trains – the Beaver, Cascade, Klamath, Oregonian, and West Coast – that continued to Oakland via the Shasta Route, and the Rogue River local service that ran to Ashland, Oregon, on the older Siskiyou Line. Service gradually was decreased; after September 1966, the Cascade was the only remaining SP service running between Portland and Eugene. It was reduced to tri-weekly service in 1970, but lasted until the start of Amtrak.

==== Portland–Seattle ====
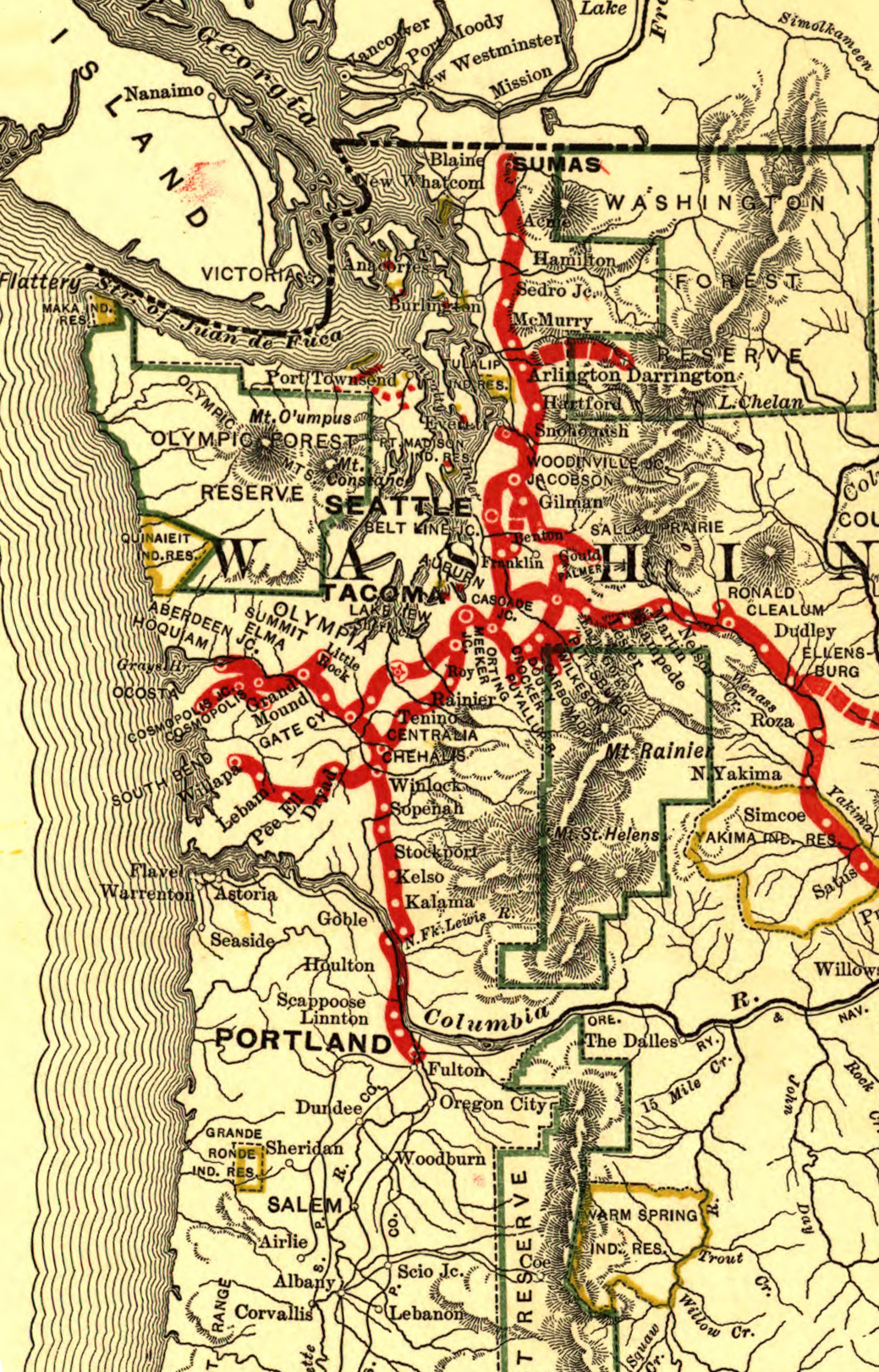
Extent of Northern Pacific Railway in Western Washington, c. 1900.

In 1864, President Abraham Lincoln signed the Northern Pacific Charter, which established the Northern Pacific Railway (NP) with the charge of constructing a rail connection between the Great Lakes and Puget Sound. Work on the first section of the railway's right-of-way in Washington Territory began at Kalama in 1870. After an 1873 decision to place the Puget Sound terminus in Tacoma, Washington, scheduled service on the NP's Pacific Division between Kalama and Tacoma began on January 5, 1874. The NP-affiliated Puget Sound Shore Railroad connected Tacoma to Seattle on July 6, 1884. Rail service between Tacoma and Portland, Oregon (with a ferry between Goble, Oregon and Kalama) began on October 9, 1884. The original line was extended south from Kalama to Vancouver, Washington, in 1901 by the Washington Railway & Navigation Company, which was soon acquired by the NP. In 1906, the Portland and Seattle Railroad Company – a joint venture of the NP and the Great Northern Railway (GN), both owned by James J. Hill, began construction of the final link from Vancouver into Portland. The 1908 opening of the Columbia River bridge completed the all-rail route ("Prairie Line") between Seattle and Portland, eliminating the need for the ferry crossing at Kalama.

By August 1909, the NP ran four daily round trips between Portland and Seattle. The next January, the NP signed an agreement with the Oregon–Washington Railroad and Navigation Company – a subsidiary of the Union Pacific Railroad (UP) – giving the UP trackage rights over the Prairie Line. A similar agreement with the GN was reached that June. By May 1914, three railroads ran some 11 daily Seattle–Portland round trips (4 NP, 4 UP, and 3 GN) plus a number of freight trains. The GN used the 1884-built NP route into 1906-built King Street Station in Seattle, while the UP used the 1909-built Milwaukee Road line into Union Station. The substantially increased passenger service on the NP required the original single-track mainline to be straightened and double tracked. This was completed between Portland and Kalama in 1909, and between Kalama and Tenino, Washington, around 1915.

However, the section of the Prairie Line between Tenino and Tacoma had a 2.2-mile (3.5 km) section of difficult 2.2% grade. The NP opened Tacoma Union Station and the new water-level Point Defiance Line around Point Defiance in December 1914. The southern 6 miles (9.7 km) between Tenino and Plumb, Washington, was reused from the Olympia Branch of the Port Townsend Southern Railroad, purchased earlier that year, while a short section east of Olympia used the 1891-opened Tacoma, Olympia & Grays Harbor Railroad. Although slightly longer than the Prairie Line, the Point Defiance Line was substantially flatter. The UP moved all service to the new line, and the NP moved most service, though the GN continued to use the old line.

By the mid-1920s, the GN, NP, and UP began operating "Pool Service", where tickets were cross-honored between the three railroads on their Seattle–Portland services. In 1933, the three railroads reduced service to one daily round trip each – a level maintained for several decades. The GN trip was moved to the Point Defiance Line on August 8, 1943, ending through service on the Prairie Line north of Tenino, and the last passenger service between Tacoma and Grays Harbor via Olympia and Lakewood ended in February 1956. The GN and NP were merged into the Burlington Northern Railroad (BN) in 1970. Final pre-Amtrak BN-UP Pool Service consisted of three daily round trips – one (UP) to Union Station, and two (BN) to King Street. The original line was upgraded in the 2010s, with Sounder and Amtrak service added via the Point Defiance Bypass.

==== Seattle–Vancouver ====
The original line from Seattle to Vancouver, British Columbia, was completed by four separate companies which were soon consolidated under James J. Hill's Great Northern Railway (GN) to provide the GN with two Pacific ports. The Fairhaven and Southern Railroad (F&S) was completed from Sedro, Washington, to Fairhaven, Washington, in late 1889, with an extension along the shoreline to the international border at Blaine, Washington, completed on October 25, 1890. The Hill-controlled New Westminster Southern Railway was simultaneously completed from Brownsville, British Columbia (across the Fraser River from New Westminster), to the international border, where it was connected to the F&S on January 10, 1891. In 1890, Hill incorporated the Seattle and Montana Railroad, which acquired the struggling F&S and began construction from Seattle northwards to a connection with the F&S in Belfast, Washington. The first Seattle–Brownsville through train ran on November 27, 1891; regular service began on December 4. The GN transcontinental route was completed in 1893; it connected to the Seattle and Montana at Everett, Washington.

In August 1902, the John Hendry–owned Vancouver, Westminster and Yukon Railway began construction of a line from the rapidly growing city of Vancouver, British Columbia, to New Westminster, with a bridge crossing the Fraser River to connect with the GN. The GN gained access to Vancouver with the completion of the New Westminster Bridge and the VW&Y in late 1904. The New Westminster Southern was formally purchased by the GN in 1891, the Seattle and Montana in 1907, and the VW&Y via its Canadian subsidiary Vancouver, Victoria and Eastern Railway and Navigation Company (VV&E) in 1908 after years of poor relations, formalizing GN control of the corridor.

The GN was not the first Seattle–Vancouver rail route—the Northern Pacific-owned Seattle, Lake Shore and Eastern Railway (SLS&E) was completed from Seattle to a connection with the Canadian Pacific Railway at Mission, British Columbia, in 1891. However, the inland SLS&E route had numerous curves and steep grades; Hill had considered purchasing it in 1890, but deciding that constructing the Seattle and Montana would allow superior service. Passenger service ended on the SLS&E in the mid-1920s, leaving the GN as the only Seattle–Vancouver passenger route.

Several portions of the route were realigned in the first decades of the 20th century. Replacement of leased trackage with GN-owned trackage in Everett, including a new tunnel under the downtown area, was completed on October 7, 1900. A tunnel into downtown Seattle opened in 1905 to reach King Street Station, which opened the next year. Construction began in 1901 on the Chuckanut Cutoff, which ran at water level along Bellingham Bay between Fairhaven and Belleville (north of Burlington, Washington) to bypass the numerous sharp curves on the original F&S route. The cutoff opened on February 15, 1903, and the original F&S line was abandoned from Fairhaven to Lake Samish. The Great Northern and VV&E opened a new coastal route with lower grades from Brownsville to Blaine on March 15, 1909. The construction of the Lake Washington Ship Canal in Seattle, which began in 1911, necessitated the replacement of the single-track bridge connecting Interbay Yard and Ballard. The new double-track bridge and 2.5 miles (4.0 km) of connecting line opened in 1914.

By 1913, the GN operated four Seattle–Vancouver round trips (three of which continued south to Portland) and one Seattle–Blaine round trip; this decreased to three Seattle–Vancouver round trips by 1928. The 1950 introduction of the streamlined International increased daily service to four daily round trips – three Internationals and one unnamed local. The GN dropped one International round trip in May 1960, and a second in June 1969. By the time Amtrak began operations, the Burlington Northern ran a single daily International round trip.

=== Amtrak era ===
Initial Amtrak service in 1971 consisted of an unnamed tri-weekly Seattle–San Diego train (later named Coast Starlight-Daylight) and two unnamed Seattle–Portland round trips (later named Mount Rainier and Puget Sound), with no service north of Seattle. The Empire Builder also ran on the corridor between Seattle and the connection with the ex-Northern Pacific mainline at Auburn, Washington. The daily Seattle–Vancouver Pacific International began service on July 17, 1972. Coast Starlight-Daylight (later Coast Starlight) service became daily on June 10, 1973, resulting in three daily Seattle–Portland round trips. The Seattle–Salt Lake City Pioneer displaced the Puget Sound on June 7, 1977, with no change to service levels on the corridor. From June 11, 1973, until its discontinuance on October 8, 1979, the North Coast Hiawatha also ran on the corridor between Seattle and the connection with the ex-Great Northern mainline at Everett.

In 1977, the Oregon Department of Transportation (ODOT) studied the possibility of 100-mile-per-hour (160 km/h) service between Portland and Eugene. Two additional Portland–Eugene round trips were added on August 3, 1980, with the introduction of the state-subsidized Willamette Valley. The Pacific International was discontinued on September 30, 1981, ending service north of Seattle. The stops at Edmonds and Everett were restored on October 25 when the Empire Builder was rerouted over the ex-GN mainline. A Portland section of the Empire Builder, which ran on the corridor between Portland and Vancouver, Washington, was also created at that time. The Willamette Valley was discontinued on December 31, 1981, after state funding was ended. Service remained largely constant until November 4, 1993, when the Pioneer was reduced to tri-weekly service.

==== Expanded service ====
The 1991 passage of the Intermodal Surface Transportation Efficiency Act resulted in the designation of five high-speed-rail corridors in October 1992 – among them the Eugene–Vancouver Pacific Northwest High-Speed Rail Corridor. Between 1992 and 1994, ODOT studied service improvements on the Portland–Eugene section of the corridor. Several reports produced by the Washington Department of Transportation in 1992 indicated that maglev service on an all-new right-of-way or electrification of the existing corridor would be impractical, leaving enhancements to diesel-powered trains as the likely option for improved service. In 1993, the Washington legislature allocated funds for the development of incremental improvements to Amtrak service in the state. Daily service was to be eventually increased to 13 Seattle–Portland round trips and 4 Seattle–Vancouver round trips. Tilting trains and infrastructure improvements were to be used to decrease travel times – from 4 hours to 2.5 hours between Seattle and Portland, and from 4 hours to 3 hours between Seattle and Vancouver. Work on a corridor-level environmental impact statement for the Washington section of the corridor began in January 1996; however, it was suspended in August 2000 in favor of less intensive environmental documentation for individual projects.

Parallel to this infrastructure planning, the states began funding service expansions on a trial basis. On April 1, 1994, Washington began a 6-month trial of a rented Talgo tilting trainset, which was used to add an additional Seattle–Portland round trip called Northwest Talgo. On October 1, 1994, the Northwest Talgo was replaced by the Mount Adams using conventional equipment. ODOT funded an extension of the Mount Rainier to Eugene, which began on October 30. WSDOT also funded the Seattle–Vancouver Mount Baker International, which began service on May 26, 1995, using the rented Talgo set previously used on the Northwest Talgo.

=== Modern changes ===
Current investment in passenger rail in the Pacific Northwest Corridor will not be used to create a dedicated high speed passenger rail corridor from the ground up, but will instead create more modest systematic improvements to the existing railway used by the Amtrak Cascades line that uses trackage owned primarily by private freight railways. On January 27, 2010, the federal government announced $590 million of ARRA stimulus funds would go to Washington State for higher speed improvements of its section of the corridor. Additionally, the state of Oregon received $8 million to improve Portland's Union Station and trackways in the area. On December 9, 2010, US Transportation Secretary Ray LaHood announced that Washington State would receive an additional $161 million in federal higher-speed rail funding from the Federal Rail Administration after newly elected governors in both Wisconsin and Ohio turned down their states' high-speed rail funding. This brought Washington's total funding to about $782 million. These investments funded the construction of the Point Defiance Bypass, which reduced travel times and enabled the addition of two extra trips in the Seattle-Portland Amtrak Cascades corridor daily.

==== Ultra high speed rail ====
In July 2017, the Washington State Legislature budgeted $300,000 for a preliminary feasibility study of "Ultra High Speed ground transportation" operating at speeds of 250 miles per hour (400 km/h) or more, linking Vancouver, BC, to Seattle and Portland. This study was completed by December that year, and analysed technology options, route options, preliminary financing and funding models, and recommended conducting a more detailed business case analysis that will examine ridership projections, governance, funding and financing models in greater detail. Microsoft paid $60,000 for this preliminary study, and had also earlier sponsored an economic analysis report which served as the catalyst for this preliminary study commissioned by Washington state.

In March 2018, Washington state authorized up to $750,000 to be spent on conducting a detailed business case analysis as recommended by the preliminary feasibility study, if additional funding sources could be identified. In July 2018, Washington governor Jay Inslee travelled to Vancouver, British Columbia, to meet with B.C. Premier John Horgan. As a result of that and other meetings, additional funding sources were identified and eventually increased to around US$1.55 million and came from 4 sources: CA$300,000 from the B.C. provincial government, US$750,000 from Washington State, US$300,000 from Oregon's Department of Transportation, and US$300,000 from Microsoft. In October 2018, the Cascadia Innovation Corridor Conference, a Microsoft co-sponsored, cross-border initiative to encourage cross border business investment and collaboration, met for the third time, where one of the topics was to discuss updates on the high-speed rail business case analysis.

In January 2019, the Washington State Legislature passed a bill that approved up to $900,000 to study the creation of a high-speed rail authority in Washington state if additional funding sources could be identified. Again, Jay Inslee travelled to Vancouver to meet with John Horgan, and as a result, Horgan announced that the BC provincial government would contribute CA$300,000 towards studying a cross-border governance model for the high speed rail authority. Additional funding for the balance came later on from Oregon and Microsoft.

In July 2019, the business cases analysis was completed and a detailed report was submitted to WSDOT. The detailed report confirmed that an ultra-high-speed rail system could be constructed within the 2017 estimate of $24 to $42 billion and help establish the Pacific Northwest as a megaregion if construction were to start by 2027. Later in the year, various groups held conferences to discuss the findings of the business case analysis and promote ultra-high-speed rail in general. The most notable conference was the Cascadia Rail Summit held in November 2019, held at Microsoft's headquarters in Redmond, Washington, which brought participants from private corporations, pro-business non-profits, government organizations and universities from both sides of the border.

In November 2021, a memorandum of understanding (MoU) to bring high-speed rail to the Cascadia Corridor was signed by Washington governor Jay Inslee, Oregon governor Kate Brown, and British Columbia premier John Horgan. In December 2024, WSDOT secured a $49.7 million grant from the Federal Railroad Administration to develop a service development plan for Cascadia High-Speed Rail. The Program will also receive $5.5 million in state match funds from the Washington State Legislature. These funds will be used for technical work and community and partner engagement to look at market and potential ridership, route options, and environmental considerations.
