= List of bridges in Portland, Oregon =

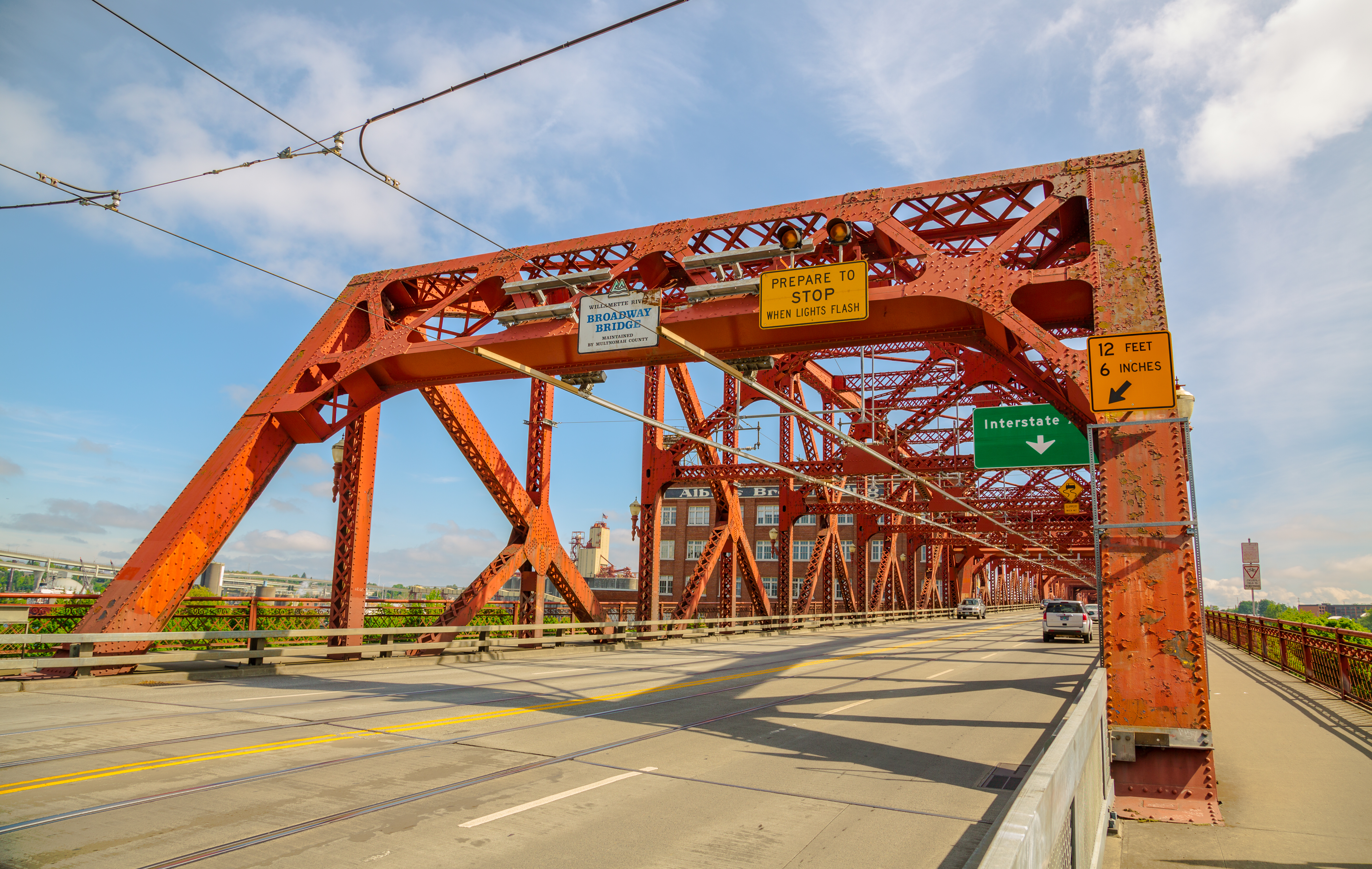
Broadway Bridge over the Willamette River

The city of Portland, Oregon, contains many bridges over various geographical features and roads of varying lengths and usages. Some bridges carry roads, some carry pedestrians only, some carry trains only, and others have various restrictions.

Bridges over the Willamette River comprise a majority of the notable bridges in the city. Portland has 12 bridges that span the Willamette, while only two road bridges cross the Columbia River, and other notable bridges cross roads, canyons or other bodies of water. Interstate 5 crosses the Willamette via the Marquam Bridge and the Columbia via the Interstate Bridge. Due to the large number of bridges crossing the Willamette in the center of town, Portland's nicknames include "Bridge City" and "Bridgetown."

== List of bridges ==
Key: Year opened
*: Listed on the National Register of Historic Places
†: Listed as a city historic landmark

=== Columbia River system ===
Name (Alternative names in parentheses)	Image	Year opened	Type	Length	Spans	Carries	Coordinates
Oregon Slough Railroad Bridge (BNSF Bridge 8.8)	Silver metal bridge	1908	Swing bridge, Pratt truss	1,524 feet (465 m)	North Portland Harbor (an anabranch of the Columbia River)	BNSF Railway	45.61425°N 122.702306°W
Burlington Northern Railroad Bridge 9.6 (BNSF Bridge 9.6)	Silver steel swingspan bridge with span turned	1908	Swing bridge, Pratt truss	2,807 feet (856 m)	Columbia River	BNSF Railway	45.62473°N 122.69085°W
Interstate Bridge (Portland–Vancouver Highway Bridge)	Green steel lift-span bridge with lift span raised	1917* (and second, parallel bridge in 1958)	Truss with lift span	3,538 feet (1,078 m)	Columbia River	Interstate 5	45.606667°N 122.680833°W
Glenn L. Jackson Memorial Bridge	Concrete bridge curved over water	1982	Segmental	11,750 feet (3,580 m)	Columbia River	Interstate 205	45.593056°N 122.548611°W

=== Willamette River ===
Name (Alternative names in parentheses)	Image	Year opened	Type	Length	Spans	Carries	Coordinates
St. Johns Bridge	Green metal bridge	1931†	Suspension	2,067 feet (630 m)	Willamette River	US 30 Byp.	45°35′07″N 122°45′52″W
Burlington Northern Railroad Bridge 5.1 (St. Johns Railway Bridge)	Brown metal bridge with midsection raised	1908	Vertical-lift bridge; converted from swing span in 1989	1,763 feet (537 m)	Willamette River	BNSF Railway	45°34′36″N 122°44′51″W
Fremont Bridge	Pale green metal arched bridge	1973	Tied-arch bridge	2,154 feet (657 m)	Willamette River	I-405 / US 30	45°32′16″N 122°40′59″W
Broadway Bridge	Red metal bridge with draw bridge section raised	1913*	Truss with double-leaf "Rall"-type bascule span	1,742 feet (531 m)	Willamette River	Broadway; Portland Streetcar A Loop and B Loop	45°31′55″N 122°40′27″W
Steel Bridge	Black metal bridge	1912	Through truss with a double vertical-lift span	800 feet (240 m)	Willamette River	Union Pacific Railway; Amtrak; MAX Light Rail; Glisan Street, Interstate Avenue; Formerly Harbor Drive (former OR 99W)	45°31′39″N 122°40′09″W
Burnside Bridge	Concrete and metal bridge with lift open	1926*	Double-leaf "Strauss-type" bascule	1,382 feet (421 m)	Willamette River	Burnside Street	45°31′23″N 122°40′03″W
Morrison Bridge	Concrete and metal bridge at night	1958*	Double-leaf "Chicago style" bascule	760 feet (230 m)	Willamette River	Morrison Street	45°31′04″N 122°40′11″W
Hawthorne Bridge	Green metal bridge with lift rising	1910*†	Parker truss with a vertical-lift span	1,382 feet (421 m)	Willamette River	Hawthorne Boulevard	45°30′47″N 122°40′14″W
Marquam Bridge	Gray steel bridge	1966	Cantilever truss	1,043 feet (318 m)	Willamette River	I-5	45°30′29″N 122°40′09″W
Tilikum Crossing	Concretet bridge at night	2015	Cable-stayed	1,720 feet (520 m)	Willamette River	TriMet MAX Orange Line and buses; Portland Streetcar	45°30′20″N 122°39′54″W
Ross Island Bridge	Metal arched bridge	1926	Cantilever deck truss	3,729 feet (1,137 m)	Willamette River	US 26 (Powell Boulevard)	45°30′04″N 122°39′52″W
Sellwood Bridge	Concrete and brown metal bridge	2016	Deck arch bridge	1,976 feet (602 m)	Willamette River	Tacoma Street	45°27′52″N 122°39′56″W

=== Others ===
Name (Alternative names in parentheses)	Image	Year opened	Type	Length	Spans	Carries	Coordinates
Blue Bridge (Cross Canyon Bridge)	Footbridge	1992			Reed Lake	Pedestrians and bicycles	45.48184°N 122.63037°W
Blumenauer Bridge	Footbridge	2022	Tied arch	475 feet (145 m)	Banfield Freeway (on Interstate 84)	Pedestrians and bicycles	45.52654°N 122.65873°W
Bybee Bridge	Bridge deck	1911			OR 99E (McLoughlin Boulevard)	Bybee Boulevard	45.47439°N 122.63987°W
Cedar Crossing Bridge	Wooden covered bridge	1982	Covered bridge	60 feet (18 m)	Johnson Creek	Deardorff Road	45°28′19.3″N 122°31′25.4″W
Eastbank Esplanade	Floating bridge	2001	Pontoon	1,200 feet (370 m)	Bank of the eastside of the Willamette River	Pedestrians and bicycles	
Ned Flanders Crossing	Side of pedestrian bridge over freeway	2021		200 feet (61 m)	Interstate 405	Pedestrians and bicycles	45.5257°N 122.6868°W
Gibbs Street Pedestrian Bridge	End of bridge	2012		700 feet (210 m)	Interstate 5 and SW Macadam Avenue	Pedestrians and bicycles	45.4993°N 122.673°W
Vista Bridge (Vista Avenue Viaduct)	Arch bridge at night from below	1926*†	Concrete arch	248 feet (76 m)	MAX Light Rail line and Jefferson Street/Canyon Road	Vista Avenue	45.519097°N 122.697844°W
Barbara Walker Crossing	View across pedestrian bridge from its north end	2019	Trichord truss	180 feet (55 m)	Burnside Street	Pedestrians and bicycles	45.5216°N 122.7195°W

== Former bridges ==
- Madison Street Bridge

== See also ==
- List of crossings of the Willamette River
- Sauvie Island Bridge – located just outside the city of Portland proper
