= Spokane, Portland and Seattle Railroad Warehouse =

Historic building in Portland, Oregon, U.S.

- U.S. National Register of Historic Places
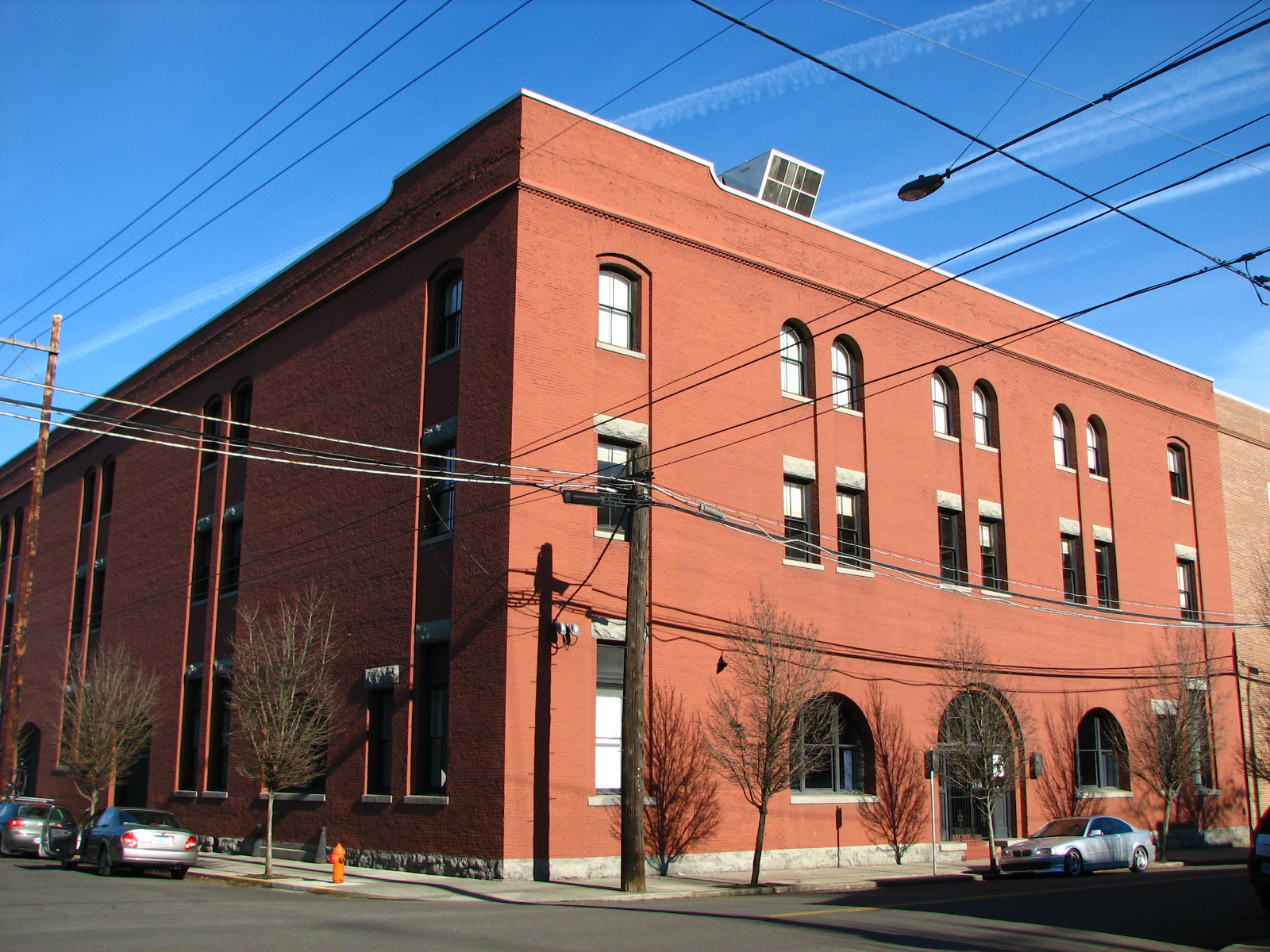
- The former SP&S Warehouse Building in 2009

- Location within Portland, Oregon Location within Oregon Location within the United States
- Location: 1631 NW Thurman St, Portland, Oregon
- Coordinates: 45.535958°N 122.688288°W
- Area: approx. 0.90 acres (0.36 ha)
- Built: c. 1908
- Architectural style: Richardsonian Romanesque
- NRHP reference No.: 96001071
- Added to NRHP: October 3, 1996

The Spokane, Portland and Seattle Railroad Warehouse, also known as the Christensen Electric Building, is a building located in Portland, Oregon, listed on the National Register of Historic Places. A former warehouse used by the Spokane, Portland and Seattle Railway, it has been converted into an office building. It was added to the National Register in 1996.

== See also ==
- National Register of Historic Places listings in Northwest Portland, Oregon
- North Bank Depot Buildings
