= Oregon Slough Railroad Bridge =

Railroad bridge in Portland, Oregon

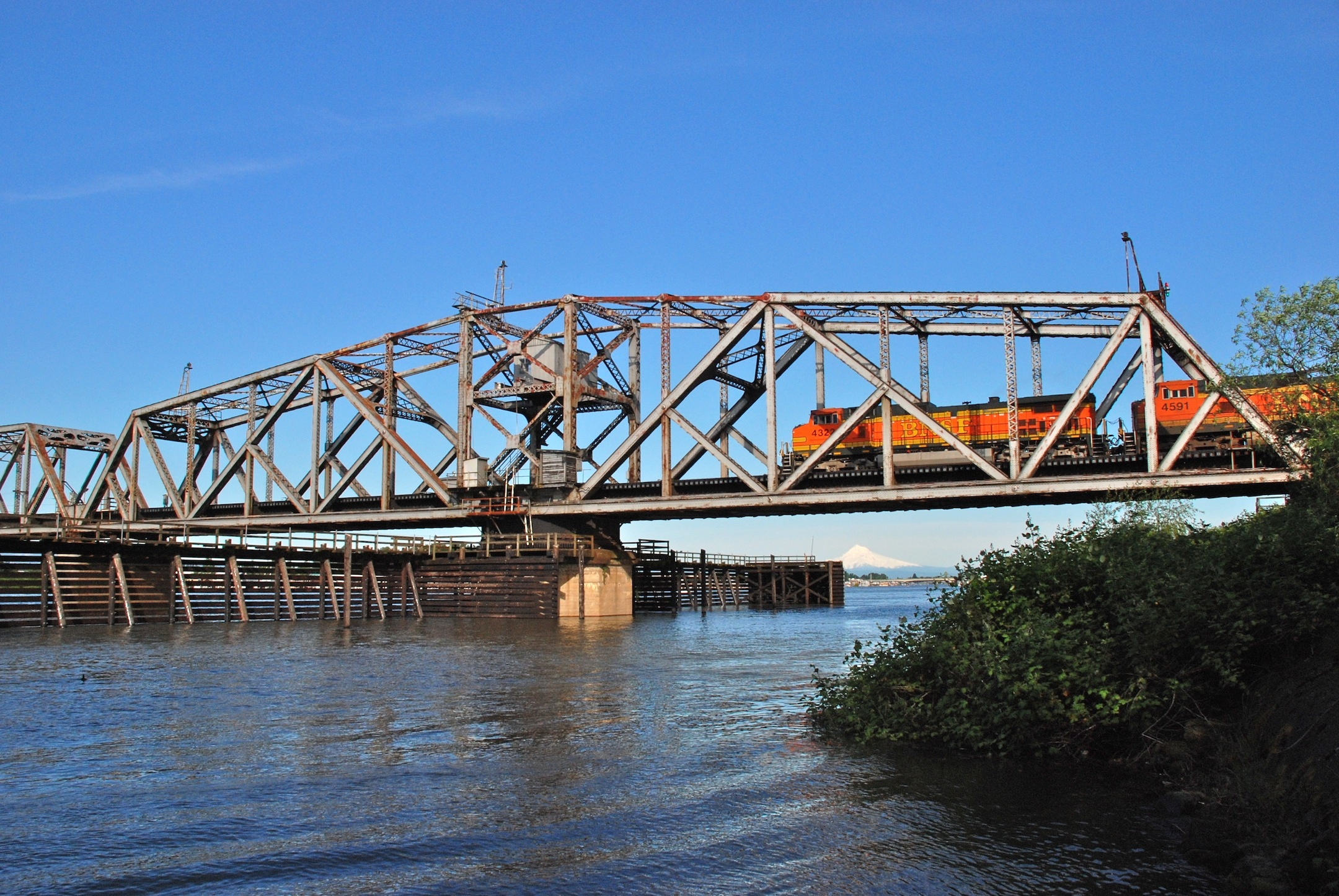
- The bridge's swing-span section in 2011
- Coordinates: 45.61425°N 122.702306°W
- Carries: 2 railroad tracks
- Crosses: North Portland Harbor (Oregon Slough)
- Locale: Portland, Oregon, United States
- Other name(s): BNSF Railway Bridge 8.8
- Owner: BNSF Railway

Characteristics
- Design: Swing bridge, Pratt truss
- Total length: 1,524 feet (465 m) (1,467 ft plus a 57-ft approach viaduct at the south end, over Marine Drive)
- Longest span: 334 feet (102 m)
- No. of spans: eight

History
- Designer: Ralph Modjeski
- Opened: 1908

The Oregon Slough Railroad Bridge, also known as the BNSF Railway Bridge 8.8, is a swing-span, through truss bridge in Portland, Oregon, United States. Currently owned and operated by BNSF Railway, it crosses an anabranch of the Columbia River known as North Portland Harbor and historically as the Oregon Slough. The bridge's northern end is on Hayden Island, which, along with Tomahawk Island, forms the north shore of the channel. Completed in 1908, the two-track bridge is one of only two swing bridges surviving in Portland, which once had several bridges of that type, both for road and rail traffic. The only other remaining swing bridge in the Portland area is another rail-only bridge on the same line, BNSF's nearby Bridge 9.6, spanning the Columbia River.

The bridge is used regularly by freight trains of both BNSF and Union Pacific Railroad, as well as by Amtrak passenger trains on routes connecting Portland with Seattle and with Chicago via Spokane, Washington. The 8.8 in the name is the distance, in miles, from Portland's Union Station, the same as for Bridge 5.1 (across the Willamette River) and Bridge 9.6 on the same line.

== History ==
The Oregon Slough Railroad Bridge was built in 1906–1908 by the Northern Pacific Railway (NP) for use by the Spokane, Portland and Seattle Railway (SP&S), as part of construction of a new line between Vancouver, Washington and Portland. SP&S was formed jointly by NP and Great Northern Railway, originally as the Portland & Seattle Railway, to build and ultimately operate new railroad lines from Portland to Seattle and Portland to Spokane. It was renamed Spokane, Portland & Seattle Railway in early 1908 (before opening any track sections) after construction of the Portland–Spokane line got under way before the Seattle line. The planned new railroad was commonly referred to as the "North Bank road" (road being short for railroad or railroad line), or North Bank line, because the Seattle line would follow the Columbia River's north bank as far as Kelso and the Spokane line would also follow the north bank, running east from Vancouver. East from Portland, the south bank of the Columbia already had a rail line, owned by the Oregon Railroad and Navigation Company (later absorbed by Union Pacific Railroad). As with the other two opening bridges built concurrently on the same Portland–Vancouver line, the span was designed by bridge engineer Ralph Modjeski.

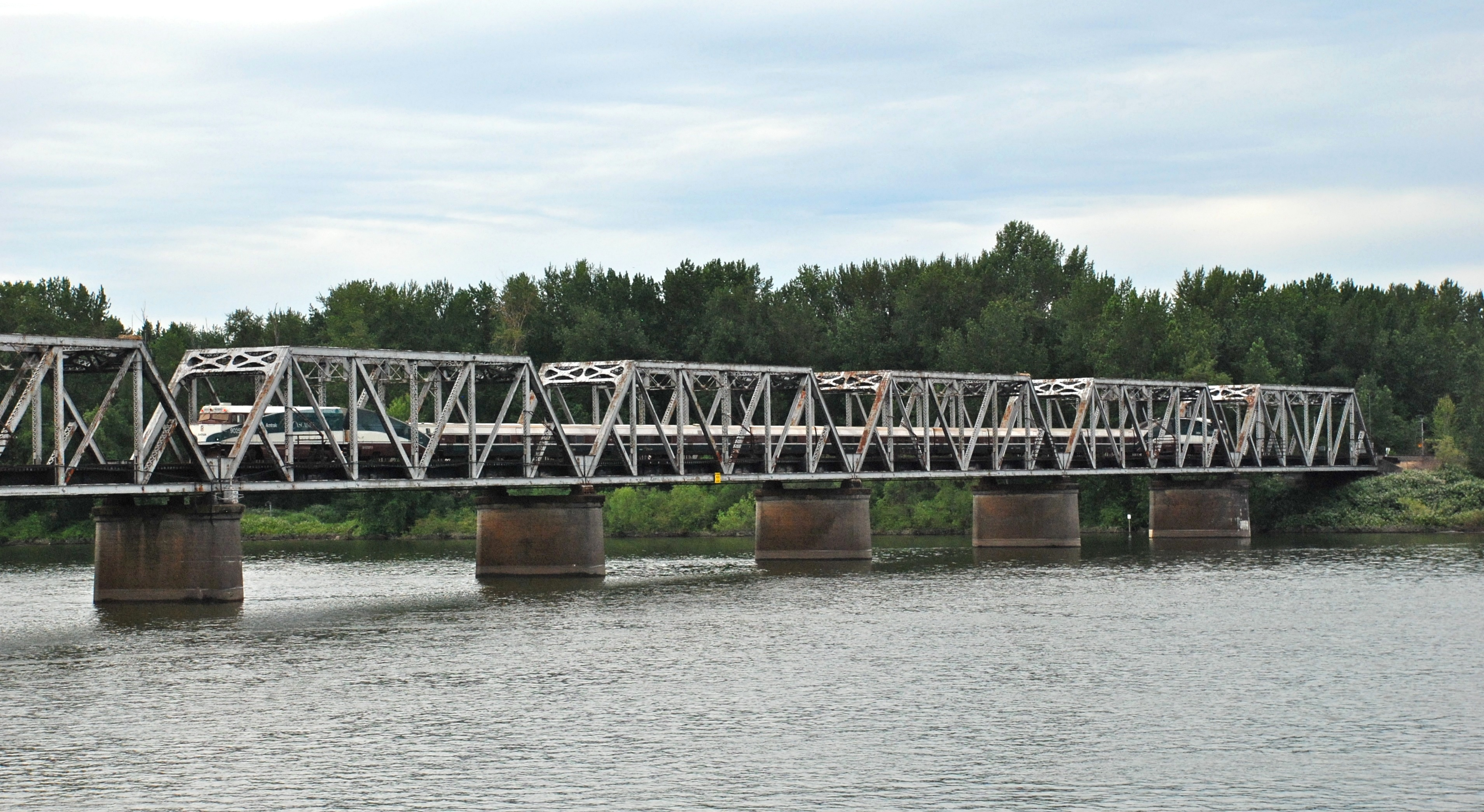
An Amtrak Cascades train crossing the fixed-span section of the bridge

Construction started in 1906, and most of the bridge structural work was completed by mid-1908. The first train crossed the span on October 23, 1908, and the bridge opened for regular use in November 1908.

The 334-foot-long (102 m) swing-span section is located at the south end. The remainder consists of seven shorter fixed-truss spans, each approximately 162 ft (49 m) in length. The bridge's owner and operator was the Spokane, Portland and Seattle Railway until that company's merger with other railroads in 1970 to form Burlington Northern Railroad (BN) and then BN until it, in turn, merged with the Atchison, Topeka and Santa Fe Railway (Santa Fe) in 1996 to form BNSF Railway.

A fire was seen on the span and put out on February 26, 2019, temporarily shutting down all train traffic.

== Operation ==
The bridge's swing span is opened for river traffic an average of only 12 times per month. Operation of the swing span is performed by an on-call operator.

== See also ==
- North Bank Depot Buildings
