= Ralph Modjeski =

Polish-American civil engineer (1861–1940)

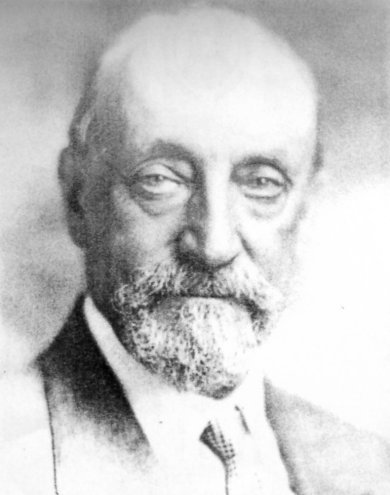
- Modjeski in 1931
- Born: Rudolf Modrzejewski; January 27, 1861; Bochnia, Galicia and Lodomeria, Austrian Empire
- Died: June 26, 1940 (aged 79); Los Angeles, California, U.S.
- Citizenship: Austria (1861–1883); United States (1883–1940)
- Known for: Building many suspension bridges throughout the United States
- Notable work: Benjamin Franklin Bridge; Manhattan Bridge; Ambassador Bridge; San Francisco–Oakland Bay Bridge
- Mother: Helena Modjeska
- Awards: Howard N. Potts Medal (1914); Franklin Medal (1921); Membership of NAS (1925); John Fritz Medal (1930)

Ralph Modjeski (born Rudolf Modrzejewski; Polish: [mɔˈdʐɛjɛfskʲi]; January 27, 1861 – June 26, 1940) was a Polish-American civil engineer who achieved prominence as "America's greatest bridge builder."

He furthered the use of suspension bridges and oversaw the design and construction of nearly forty bridges that spanned the great rivers of North America, as well as the development of new rail lines. In addition, he trained succeeding generations of American bridge designers and builders, including Joseph B. Strauss, chief engineer of San Francisco's Golden Gate Bridge (which was completed six months after Modjeski's San Francisco–Oakland Bay Bridge).

== Formative years and family ==
Modjeski was born in Bochnia, in Galicia, on January 27, 1861, to Gustav Sinnmayer Modrzejewski and actress Helena Opid Modrzejewska (known outside Poland as Helena Modjeska). In 1865, his mother left Sinnmayer, and in 1868, she married Polish nobleman Karol Bożenta Chłapowski. In July 1876, they emigrated to America, where, as a matter of convenience, the boy's mother changed her name to Helena Modjeska and her son's name to Ralph Modjeski.

He was a classmate of Ignacy Jan Paderewski in Poland and was a pianist himself.

The son returned to Europe to study at l'Ecole des Ponts et Chaussées (the School of Bridges and Roads) in Paris, France. It was in 1883, while studying at Paris, that he obtained American citizenship; however, he always maintained contact with Poland, wrote much in Polish, and emphasized his Polish origins.

In 1885, he graduated from the School of Bridges and Roads at the top of his class. That same year, he married a cousin Felicie Benda; the couple had three children. They divorced in 1931 after a sixteen-year-long separation. That same year, the seventy-year-old Modjeski married Virginia Mary Giblyn.

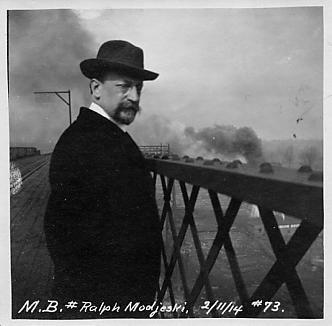
Ralph Modjeski, 1914

== Career ==
After completing his academic training, Modjeski returned to America to begin his career, working first under the "father of American bridge-building," George S. Morison. In 1893, Modjeski opened his own design office in Chicago. Joined in 1924 by Frank M. Masters Sr., the firm still exists as Modjeski & Masters.

Modjeski's first project as chief engineer was the railroad bridge across the Mississippi River at Rock Island, Illinois. During his career, he served as chief or consulting engineer on dozens of bridges across the United States.

He took over the mis-designed Quebec Bridge after the 1907 disaster that killed seventy-five workers, and succeeded in creating the longest truss span in the world (though a construction accident killed another thirteen workers). It is still the longest cantilever bridge in the world.

Modjeski was the recipient of numerous awards and honorary degrees. He received a doctorate in engineering from Illinois State University in 1911, the Franklin Medal in 1923, a doctorate honoris causa from the Lwów Polytechnic in 1929, and the prestigious John Fritz Medal in 1930. He was elected to the United States National Academy of Sciences in 1925 and the American Philosophical Society in 1926. In Modjeski's obituary, Frank Masters considered him "one of the world's leading bridge engineers." A PHMC Historical Marker was dedicated in 2007 in commemoration.

== Death ==
He died on June 26, 1940, in Los Angeles, California, nearly 80 years old. He was buried at the Inglewood Eternity Mausoleum cemetery in crypt K-208.

== Bridges ==
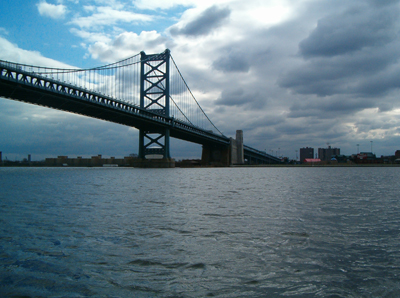
Benjamin Franklin Bridge

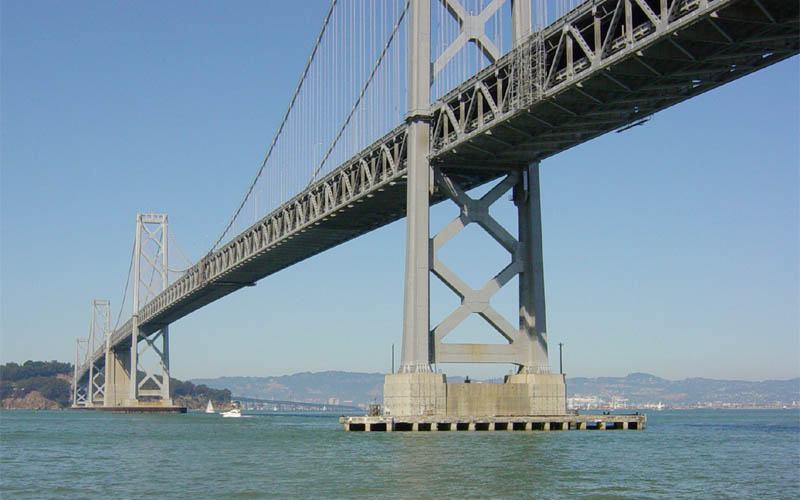
San Francisco–Oakland Bay Bridge

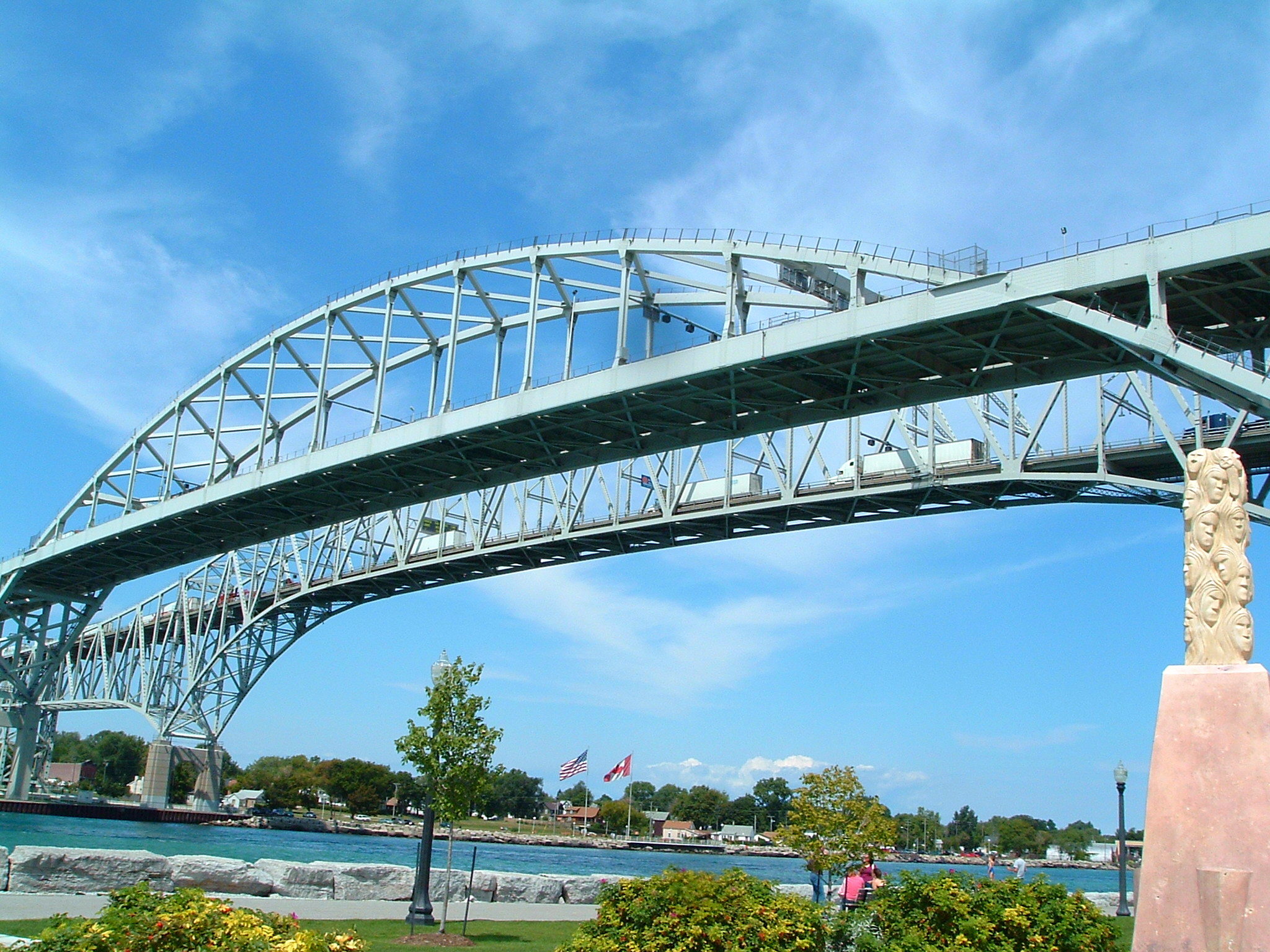
Blue Water Bridge

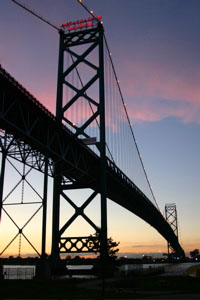
Ambassador Bridge

- Chief Engineer
  - Government Bridge (1896)
  - Thebes Bridge (1905)
  - Burlington Northern Railroad Bridge 9.6, Bridge 8.8 and Bridge 5.1 (all 1906–08)
  - Quebec Bridge (1907–1917)
  - McKinley Bridge (1910)
  - Celilo Bridge (1910)
  - Crooked River Railroad Bridge (1911)
  - Broadway Bridge (Portland, Oregon) (1913)
  - Metropolis Bridge (1914)
  - Harahan Bridge (1916)
  - Metropolis Bridge (1917)
  - Mears Memorial Bridge (1923)
  - Mid-Hudson Bridge aka Franklin Delano Roosevelt Mid-Hudson Bridge (1930)
  - Benjamin Franklin Bridge (Philadelphia, Pennsylvania and Camden, New Jersey (1926)
  - Tacony-Palmyra Bridge (Philadelphia, Pennsylvania and Palmyra, New Jersey) (1929)
  - Wissahickon Memorial Bridge (Philadelphia, Pennsylvania) (1931)
  - I-74 Bridge aka the Moline to Bettendorf Veterans Memorial Bridge 1933
  - Huey P. Long Bridge (1935)
  - Blue Water Bridge (Port Huron, Michigan and Point Edward, Ontario, 1938)
- Consulting Engineer
  - Manhattan Bridge (1909)
  - Market Street Bridge (Harrisburg, Pennsylvania) (1926)
  - Ambassador Bridge (Detroit, Michigan, and Windsor, Ontario, 1929)
  - George Rogers Clark Memorial Bridge (1929)
  - McPhaul Suspension Bridge (1929)
  - San Francisco–Oakland Bay Bridge (1936)

== See also ==
- Belle Silveira
- List of Poles
