= Spokane, Portland and Seattle Railway =

Defunct American Class I railroad (1908–1970)

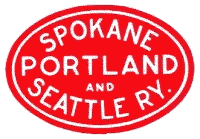

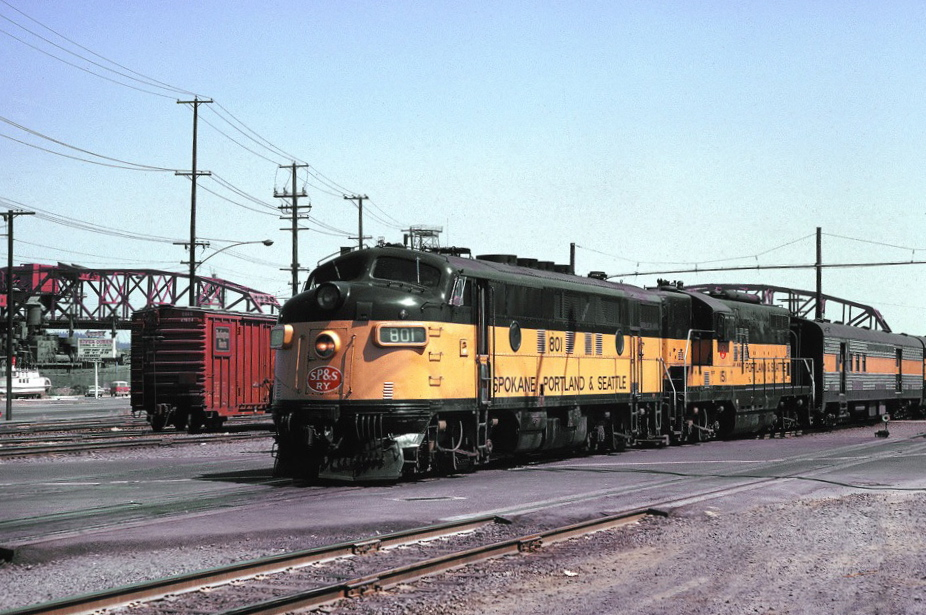
- EMD F3 #801 in 1970, departing Union Station in Portland, Oregon

Overview
- Headquarters: Portland, Oregon, U.S.
- Reporting mark: SPS
- Locale: Oregon and Washington state
- Dates of operation: 1905–1970
- Successor: Burlington Northern

Technical
- Track gauge: 4 ft 8 1/2 in (1,435 mm) standard gauge
- Length: 922 miles (1,484 km)

The Spokane, Portland & Seattle Railway (SP&S; reporting mark SPS) was a railroad in the northwest United States. Incorporated in 1905, it was a joint venture by the Great Northern Railway and the Northern Pacific Railway to build a railroad along the north bank of the Columbia River. The railroad later built or acquired other routes in Oregon. The SP&S was merged into the Burlington Northern in March 1970. Remnants of the line are currently operated by BNSF Railway and the Portland and Western Railroad.

== History ==
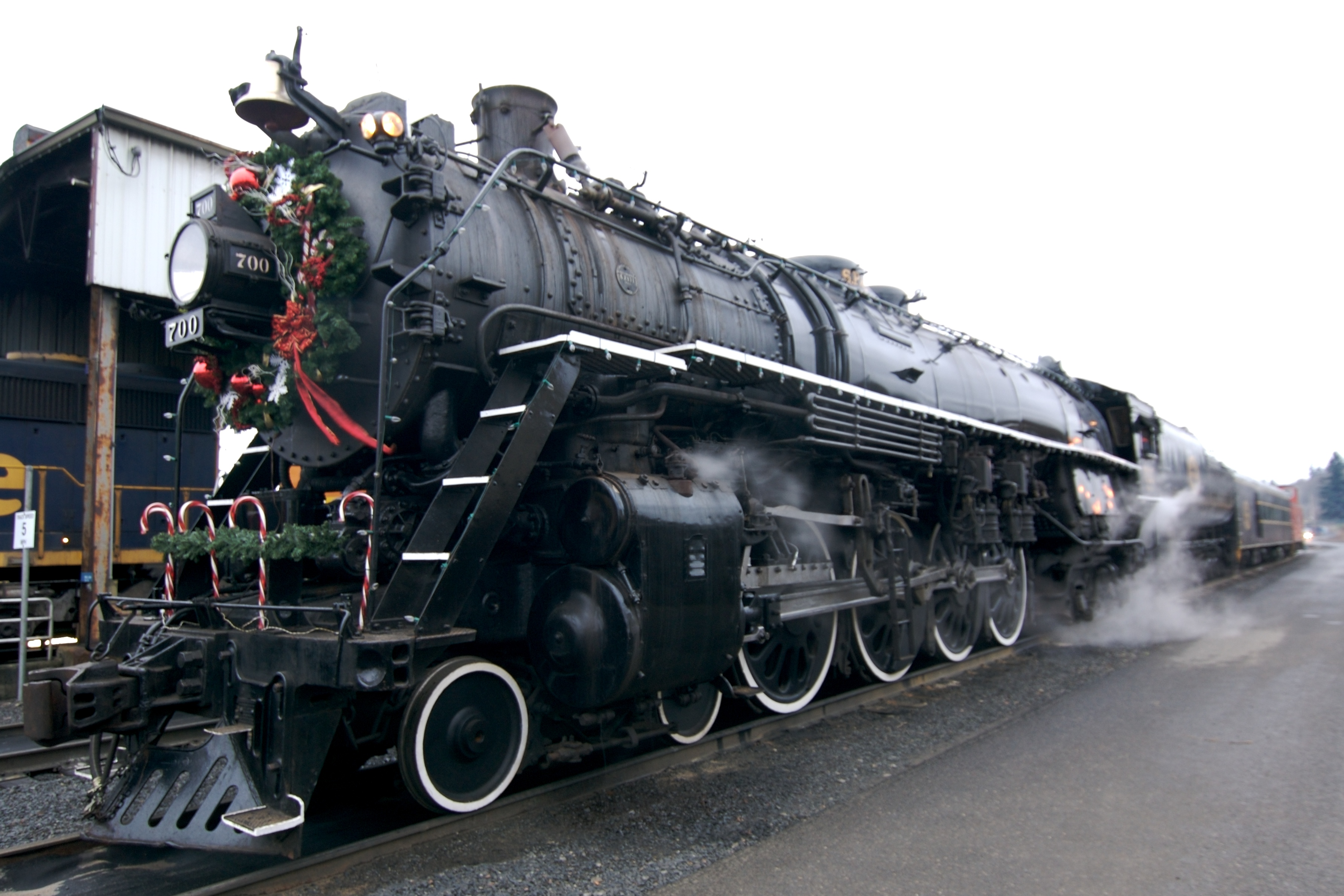
Preserved SP&S "Northern" locomotive No. 700 in 2008

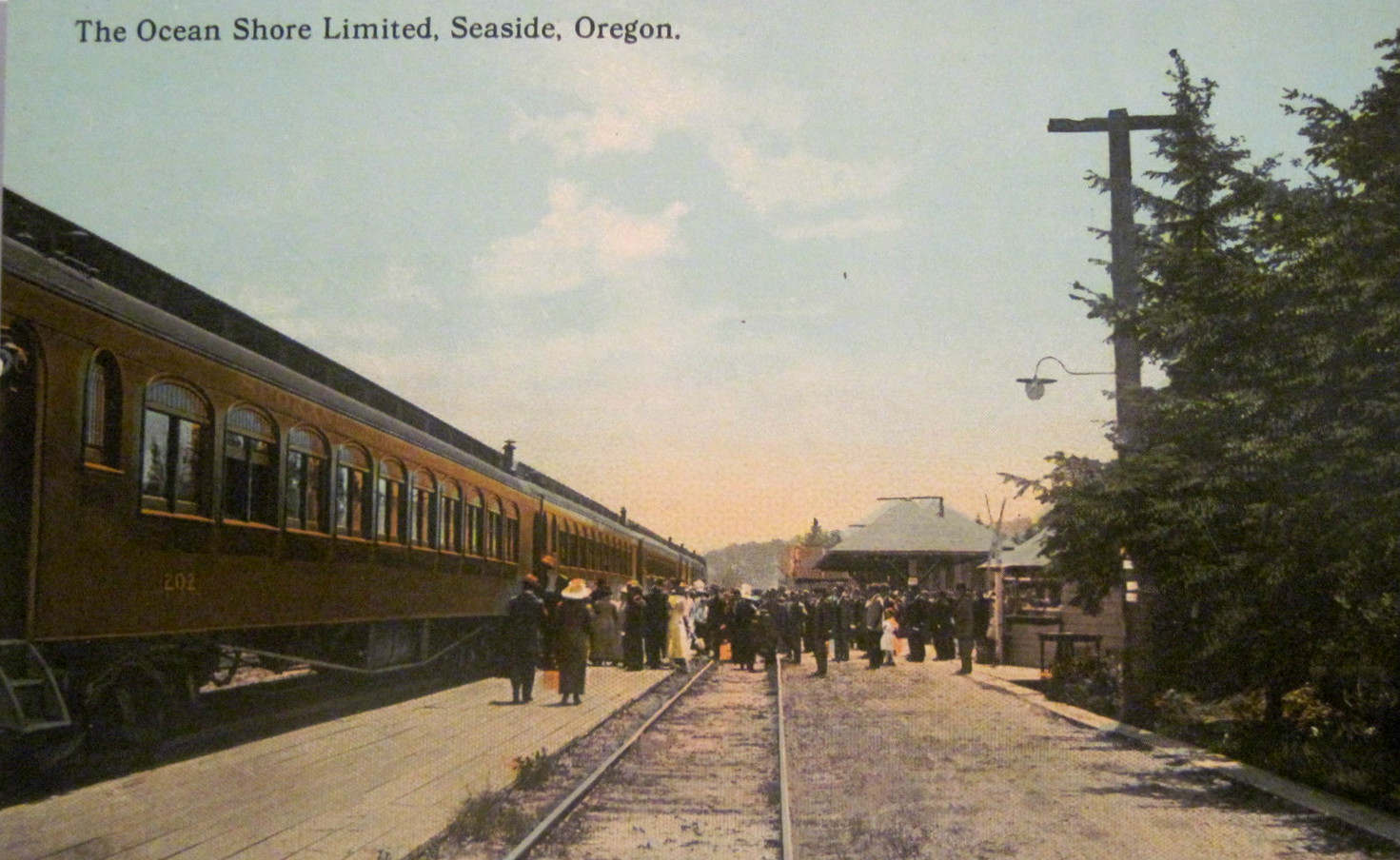
SP&S operated the Ocean Shore Limited, shown here at Seaside, Oregon

The railroad was chartered in 1905 by James J. Hill to connect the two transcontinental railroads owned by him, the Northern Pacific (NP) and Great Northern (GN), to Portland, Oregon, from Spokane, Washington, to gain a portion of the lumber trade in Oregon, a business then dominated by E. H. Harriman's Union Pacific and Southern Pacific railroads. Construction began in 1906 under the name Portland & Seattle Railway, proceeding to the east and south from Vancouver, Washington. The work included construction of three major bridges over the Columbia River, the Oregon Slough, and the Willamette River. The northernmost of these was the first bridge of any kind to be built across the lower Columbia River.

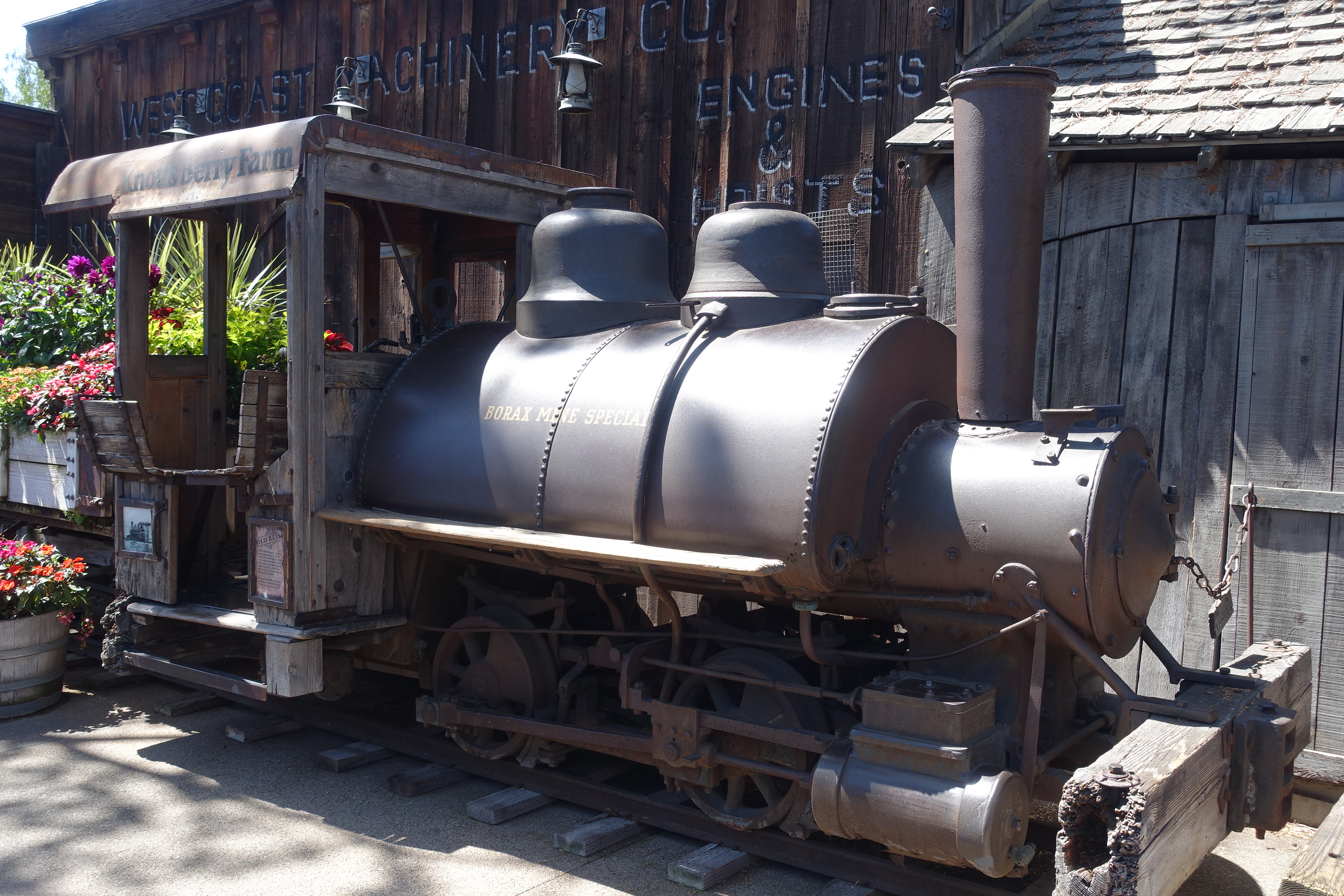
This 24"-gauge engine, built in 1906 for the Portland & Seattle RR, was used in its construction. The engine is now on display at Knott's Berry Farm in Buena Park, California.

Despite legal challenges from Harriman, within a year the line had been built as far as Pasco along the Columbia River, where it connected with NP. The first section to open was from Pasco west to Cliffs (near Maryhill), a length of 112 miles (180 km), on December 15, 1907. Operation was extended west to Lyle, 33 miles (53 km) further west, on January 15, 1908, as construction continued on the 221-mile (356 km) section from Pasco to Vancouver.

In January 1908 "Spokane" was added to the railroad's name, making it the Spokane, Portland & Seattle Railway. A "golden spike" ceremony was held on March 11, 1908 at Sheridan's Point to commemorate the completion of the railroad along the Columbia. SP&S freight and passenger service (from Pasco) to Portland was inaugurated in November 1908. (First & Second Subdivisions) By 1909 the railroad had completed construction of its line up to Spokane along the Snake River (Third Subdivision).

In 1910 the SP&S gained control of the Oregon Electric interurban railway, which James J. Hill and the Great Northern had acquired two years before. Under the control of the SP&S (Ninth, Tenth, & Eleventh Subdivision), the railroad was extended southward to Eugene by 1912. The line was extended from Albany into Lebanon, Oregon, and Sweet Home, Oregon, in 1931. The Dollar branch was completed from Sweet Home to Dollar, Oregon, later that same year.

SP&S also operated a second subsidiary railroad, which James J. Hill purchased in 1907 for 5 million dollars, in northwestern Oregon. This was previously the Astoria and Columbia River Railroad, which created a route in 1898 along the south bank of the Columbia River, from Portland through to Astoria and Seaside. This portion of the SP&S (Sixth & Seventh Subdivision) was known as the "Astoria" or "A" line.

A third route on which the SP&S operated extended southward from Wishram, Washington, to Bend, Oregon, was the Oregon Trunk Railway Company (Fifth Subdivision). Edward Harriman's Oregon Railroad and Navigation Company also was building a railroad south from the Columbia River to Bend resulting in a "railroad war" across opposite sides of the Deschutes River in which each railroad attempted to sabotage the other. In the end, the railroad opened using mostly the track of the Oregon Trunk, with a short portion of the Oregon & Washington Railway & Navigation Company track, and both railroads used the route (an arrangement that still exists with BNSF owning the majority of the line and UP having trackage rights). Building this railroad included construction in 1912 of another railroad bridge across the Columbia River, the Oregon Trunk Rail Bridge, at Wishram, Washington.

The 41 mile branch to Goldendale (Fourth Subdivision), the only branch line in Washington State, began at Lyle Washington. This railroad was originally completed in 1903 as the Columbia River & Northern Railway and was quickly acquired by the SP&S after the 1908 completion along the north bank of the Columbia River. This branch was shut down in 1992.

United Railways later became a branch line of the SP&S (Eighth Subdivision). The finished United Railways line went north from Wilkesboro through Banks, Manning, Buxton and Vernonia, Oregon. At this location, the line turned west, eventually reaching the town of Keasey, and continued on to the county line between Clatsop and Columbia Counties. Several logging companies started operation in the area, and used the United Railways to some extent. However, Oregon American traffic continued to be the largest user of the line. In 1944, the United Railways was dissolved and taken over completely by the Spokane Portland & Seattle Railway. In 1953, the line was sold to Long-Bell Lumber Company and in 1956 Long-Bell was sold to International Paper. International Paper had different plans for the region, and by September 1957 the rail traffic was gone. The line from Vernonia westward was abandoned in 1958.

During World War II the SP&S carried war materials to the Pacific Theatre; new industries located along the Columbia River, taking advantage of cheap electricity from hydroelectric dams on the river, including the Bonneville Dam, The Dalles Dam, and the McNary Dam. New industries served by the SP&S included aluminum plants, sawmills, chemical factories and grain elevators.

In 1954, a SP&S train derailed after hitting a rockslide on the route to Bend, Oregon, killing all crew members. Part of the train landed in the Deschutes River, including a boxcar, which landed in a rapid that was later named "Boxcar Rapids" after the incident.

In March 1970, the SP&S was merged into the Burlington Northern Railroad (BN). The BN was the product of the merger of four major railroads: the Great Northern Railway (GN), the Northern Pacific Railway (NP), the Spokane, Portland and Seattle Railway (SP&S) and the Chicago, Burlington and Quincy Railroad (CB&Q).

The history of the railroad is chronicled and preserved by the SP&S Historical Society.

== Passenger trains ==
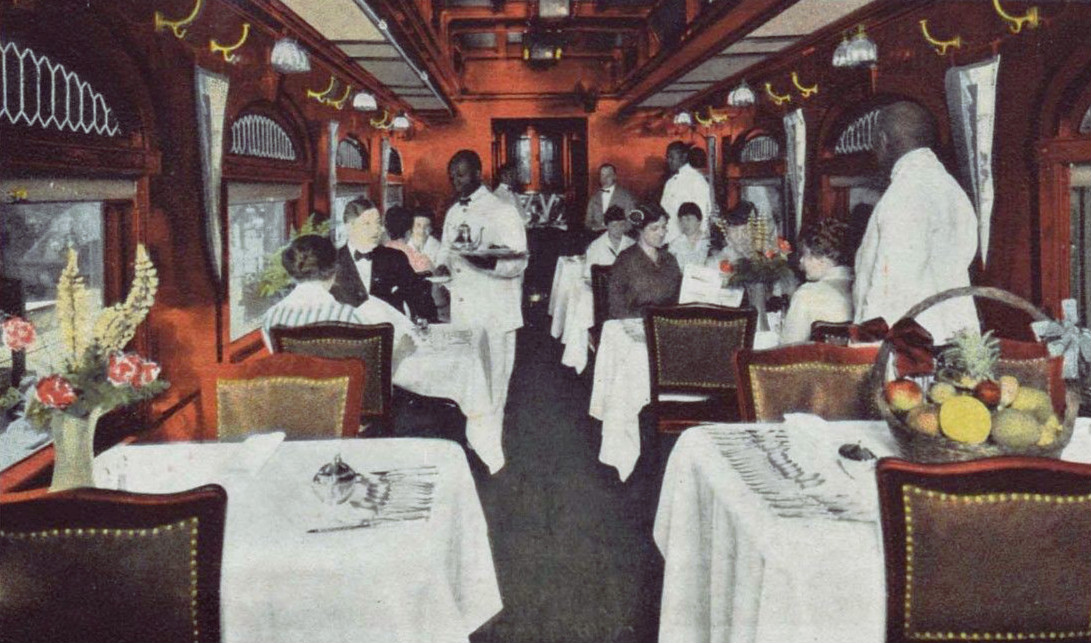
Dining car of the North Bank Limited

The SP&S's passenger operations mostly involved hosting connections with parents' trains, such as the Empire Builder and North Coast Limited, which were combined to form the Streamliner (No. 1/No. 2). Oriental Limited, Mainstreeter, and Western Star connected with (No. 3/No. 4). However, some of these SP&S trains were named. The Inland Empire Express (daytime) and North Bank Limited (overnight) provided daily, through service between Portland and Spokane. The Columbia River Express (No. 5/No. 6) operated between Portland and Pasco, connecting at Pasco with Northern Pacific No. 5/No. 6 for service to/from Spokane. From 1908 until the 1920s, the SP&S used the North Bank Depot as its Portland Terminus. After the 1920s, it used Portland (Union Station) for their passenger station arrivals and departures.

The only surviving SP&S Business car, the (second) No. 99 or "The Ruth M." (as nicknamed by a later private owner) is in operating condition and being further restored. It was built in 1915 by Barney and Smith and reconfigured by the railroad in 1927, 1948, and lastly in 1959. It resides at the Chehalis–Centralia Railroad since 2017. The car will be used as "premier seating", and during dinner trains can host a private party of up to eight in its lounge and dining room. As of 2023, the car has been repainted, and is in need of further cosmetic and mechanical repairs. The SP&S Historical Society is assisting with the efforts.

Two surviving SP&S Sleeper/Lounge cars are housed at museums, located at both ends of the reach of the railroad. These were built by the Pullman Standard Manufacturing Co. of Chicago and delivered to the railroad in 1950 at a cost of about $250,000. These cars ran in the Empire Builder service (Trains No. 1/No. 2) between Portland and Spokane. Weighing 131,000 pounds and seating up to 37 (with seating for 22 in the lounge), these lounge cars allowed passengers to buy food and drinks to enjoy with comfortable seating. The Mt. St. Helens No. 601 is at the Inland NW Rail Museum near Spokane. The Mt. Hood No. 600 is owned by the Pacific Northwest Chapter of the National Railway Historical Society and is housed at the Oregon Rail Heritage Center in Portland. These cars had a full-length antenna on the car roof. Of special note in the lounge was the push-button Farnsworth AM radio. The cars contained six single-person roomettes and three large 2-person compartments, two of them can be opened to provide a 4-person room.

Four passenger coaches, a combine, a buffet-observation car, a mail storage car, and a Pullman sleeper car are preserved at the Northwest Railway Museum in Snoqualmie, Washington. Wood coaches 213 and 218 (Barney & Smith 1912) were restored to running order between 2007 and 2019 on the museum's interpretive railway. Steel coaches 275 and 276 are also Barney & Smith products, built in 1915. Coach 275 is in storage awaiting restoration, and 276 is in running order on the museum's interpretive railway. Combine 272 (Barney & Smith 1915) was built as a coach but later modified to include a baggage section. Wood observation car 556 (Barney & Smith 1912) and steel mail storage car 52 (Barney & Smith 1915) are both in storage awaiting restoration. Mail storage car 52 was originally mail and express car 40. Pullman sleeper Wapinitia Pass #701 (Pullman 1950) was built for pool service with the Empire Builder. All of these cars were acquired by the Northwest Railway Museum between the early 1970s and early 1980s.

== Preservation ==
Preserved steam locomotives:

- Spokane, Portland and Seattle 700 - A 1938 E-1 "Northern" 4-8-4 preserved and operational in Portland, Oregon.
- Spokane, Portland and Seattle 539 - A 1917 O-3 "Mikado" 2-8-2 preserved on static display in Kalama, Washington.

Preserved diesel locomotives:

- Spokane, Portland and Seattle 804 - A 1953-built EMD F7A, now preserved and to be moved to and restored at the Inland NW Rail Museum in Reardan, Washington. As of 2023, a fund-raising effort is underway to complete the restoration.

Preserved wrecking cranes:

- Spokane, Portland and Seattle X-5 - A 1908 Industrial Works (Bay City, Michigan) 75-ton capacity steam wrecking crane, construction number 1825. Donated to the Northwest Railway Museum in Snoqualmie, Washington in 1972. As of 2023, in storage awaiting restoration.
- Spokane, Portland and Seattle X-116 - Originally Great Northern Railway boxcar 4722, built by Haskell & Barker Car Company (Michigan City, Indiana), converted in 1910 to serve as a boom tender to X-5. Acquired by the Northwest Railway Museum in 1975. As of 2023, in storage awaiting restoration.

== See also ==
- North Bank Depot Buildings – Portland terminal for SP&S service, 1908–1920s
- Vanport, Oregon
- Spokane, Portland and Seattle Railroad Warehouse
- List of Spokane, Portland and Seattle Railway locomotives
