= BNSF Railway Bridge 9.6 =

Through truss railway bridge in Oregon and Washington

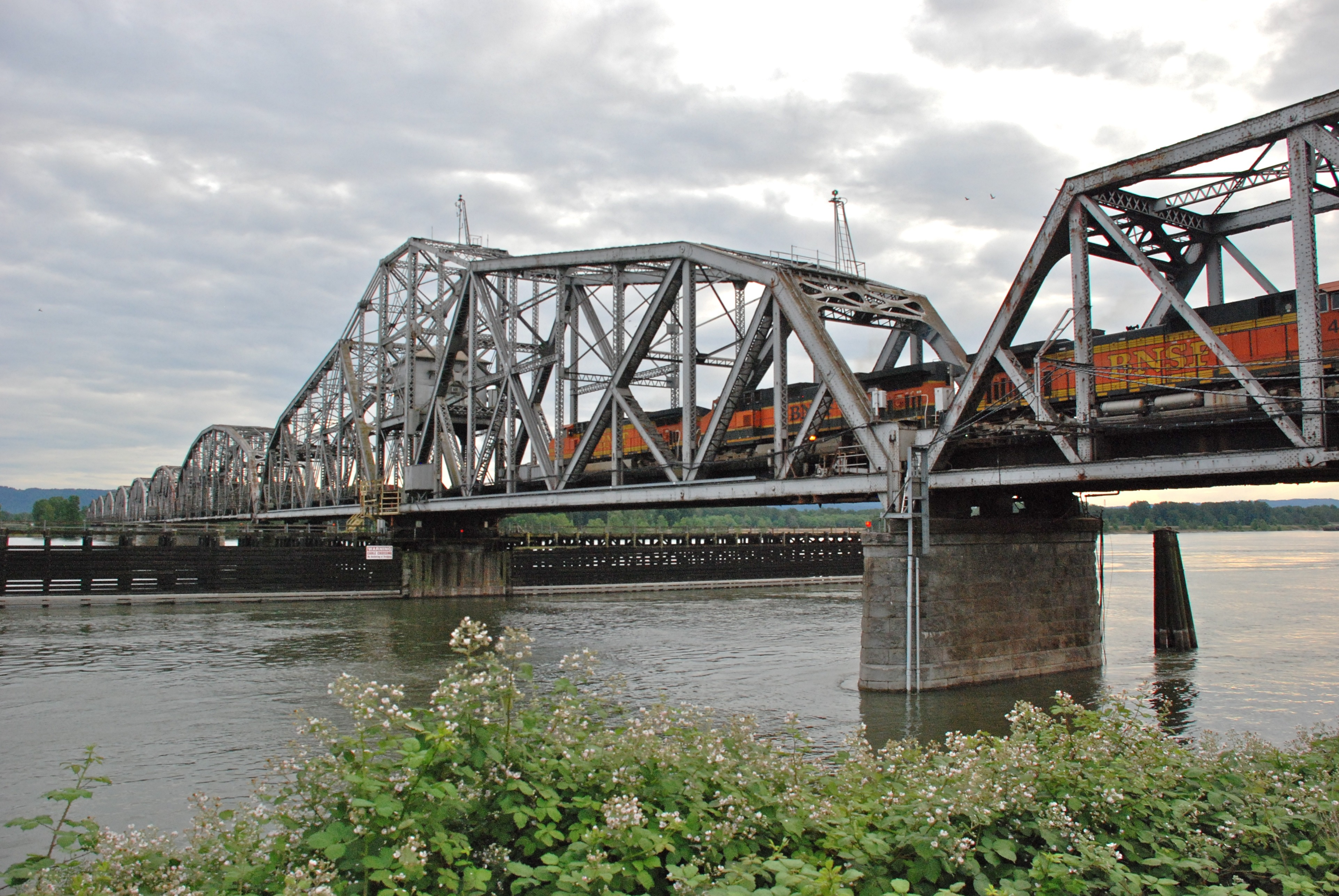
- A train crossing the bridge's 467-foot (142 m) swing-span section
- Coordinates: 45.6247°N 122.6908°W
- Carries: Freight and passenger trains
- Crosses: Columbia River
- Locale: Portland, Oregon; Vancouver, Washington
- Other names: Burlington Northern Railroad Bridge 9.6; Columbia River Railroad Bridge (at Portland)
- Owner: BNSF Railway

Characteristics
- Design: Swing bridge, Pratt truss
- Total length: 2,807 feet (856 m)
- Height: 136.154 ft (41 m)
- Longest span: 467 feet (142 m)
- Piers in water: 9
- Clearance below: 33 feet (10 m)

Rail characteristics
- No. of tracks: 2

History
- Construction start: February 8, 1906
- Construction end: July 24, 1908
- Opened: November 17, 1908

Statistics
- Daily traffic: 63 freight, 10 Amtrak per day (as of 1998)

Location
- Interactive map of BNSF Railway Bridge 9.6

The BNSF Railway Bridge 9.6, also known as the Burlington Northern Railroad Bridge 9.6 or the Columbia River Railroad Bridge, is a through truss railway bridge across the Columbia River, between Portland, Oregon, and Vancouver, Washington, owned and operated by BNSF Railway. Built by the Spokane, Portland and Seattle Railway (SP&S) and completed in 1908, it was the first bridge of any kind to be built across the lower Columbia River, preceding the first road bridge, the nearby Interstate Bridge, by a little more than eight years.

The 2,807-foot-long (856 m) bridge has a swing span, which pivots on its base to allow for the passage of taller ships. The bridge carries two railroad tracks, which are used by BNSF, Union Pacific Railroad, and Amtrak. It is one of only two surviving swing-span bridges in the Portland metropolitan area, which once had several bridges of that type. The other survivor is another BNSF bridge located nearby, on the same line and built at the same time, the Oregon Slough Railroad Bridge (also known as BNSF Railway Bridge 8.8). The 9.6 in the name is the distance, in miles, from Portland's Union Station, the same as for Bridge 5.1 (across the Willamette River) and Bridge 8.8 on the same line.

== History ==
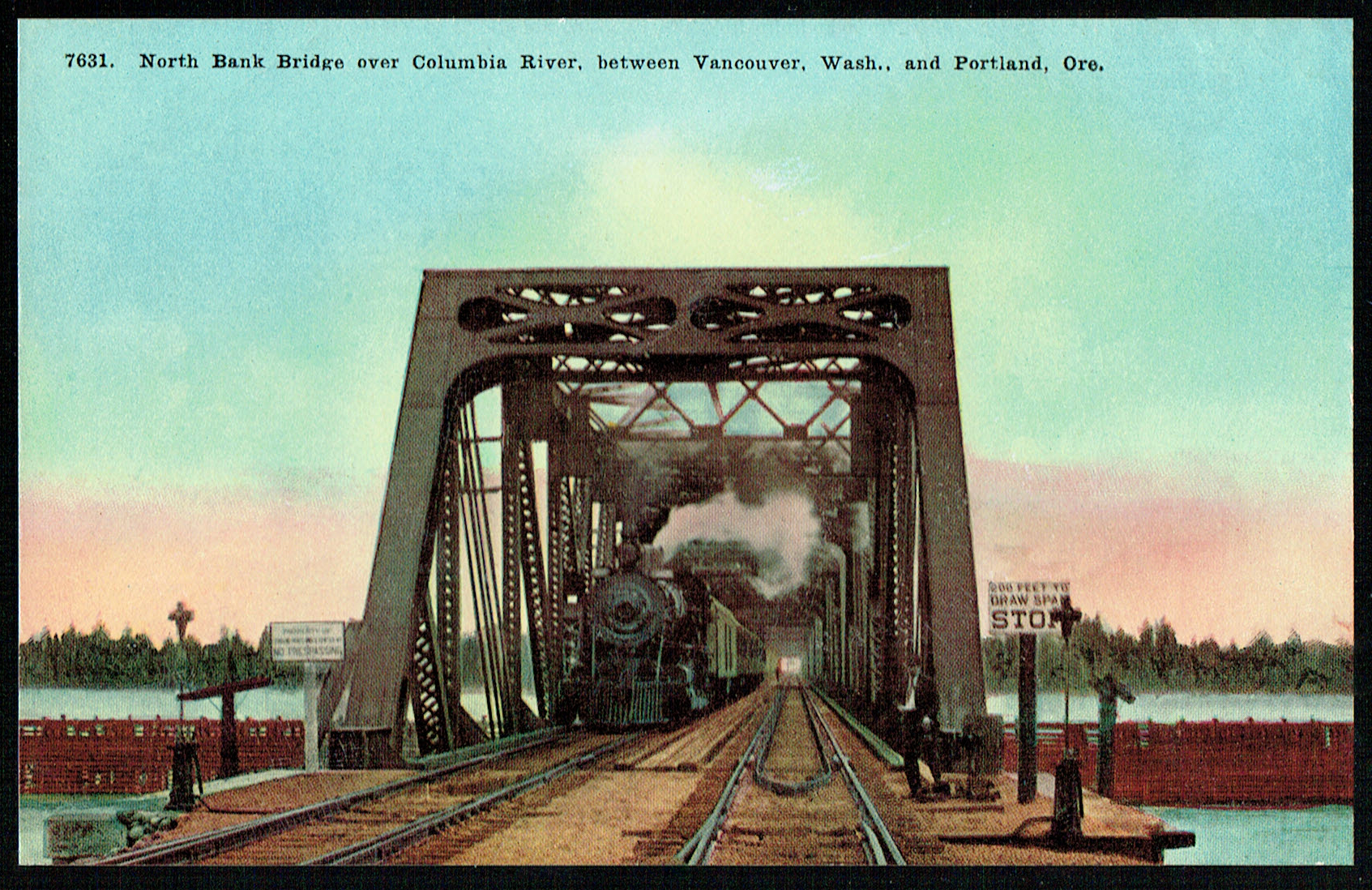
1910 postcard showing the North Bank Bridge over the Columbia River

Construction of a single-track railroad bridge at the same location was started in 1890, engineered by George S. Morison for the Portland & Puget Sound Railroad Company (affiliated with Union Pacific), but that project was abandoned at an early stage. In 1905, another crossing of the Columbia River was proposed, this time by the Northern Pacific Railway (NP), for use by the newly formed Portland & Seattle Railway. The Portland & Seattle had been formed jointly by NP and Great Northern Railway, to build and ultimately operate new railroad lines from Portland to Seattle and Portland to Spokane, but was renamed Spokane, Portland & Seattle Railway (SP&S) – in early 1908, before opening any track sections – after construction of the Portland–Spokane line got under way before the Seattle line. The planned new railroad was commonly referred to as the "North Bank road" (road being short for railroad or railroad line), or North Bank line, because the Seattle line would follow the Columbia River's north bank as far as Kelso and the Spokane line would also follow the north bank, running east from Vancouver. East from Portland, the south bank of the Columbia already had a rail line, owned by the Oregon Railroad and Navigation Company (later absorbed by Union Pacific Railroad).

The bridge was part of an overall planned new line from Vancouver to Northwest Portland, which included three major new bridges: the Columbia River Bridge, Oregon Slough Bridge and Willamette Drawbridge. Northern Pacific hired bridge builder Ralph Modjeski to design all three. On November 14, 1905, the SP&S board approved Modjeski's recommendations. Plans for the bridges were submitted to the War Department, and eventually approved in February 1906. Pier 2 of the Columbia River bridge, the pier on which the swing-span section pivots, was built as part of the canceled 1890 project, and was incorporated into the plans for the 1906 bridge.

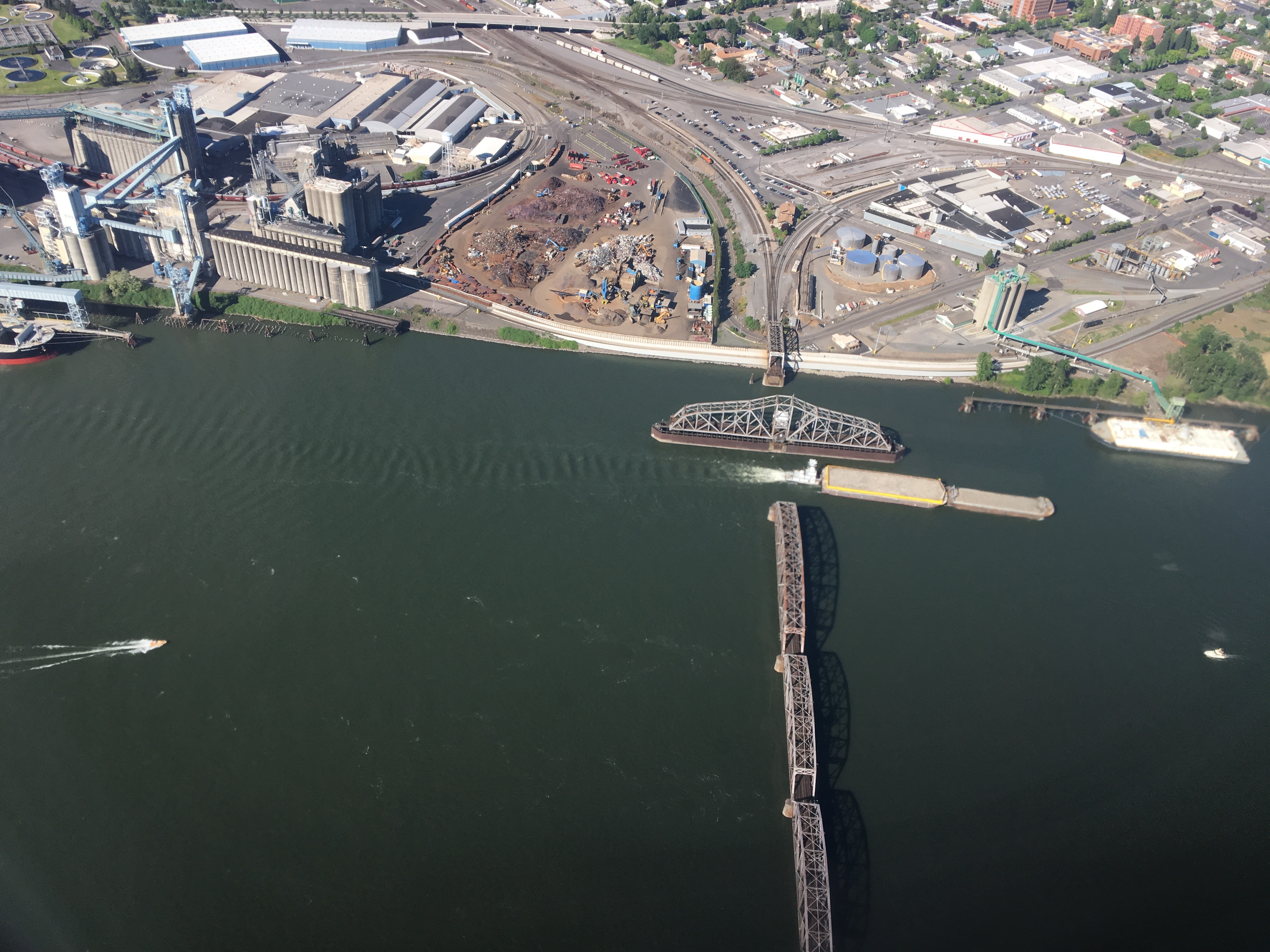
Aerial view in 2016, looking towards Vancouver, with the swing span opened for a barge

The first work was performed on February 8, 1906, when work crews began framing the caissons. The steel was fabricated by the American Bridge Company of New York. Construction took approximately 26 months. Steel construction at the site began on June 15, 1907. Structural work on the bridge was completed in June 1908, but its opening to traffic was delayed by problems concerning installation of the heavy machinery required to turn the huge swing span on the new Willamette River bridge located on the same line. The span was the first bridge of any kind to be built across the lower Columbia River, preceding the first road bridge, the nearby Interstate Bridge, by a little more than eight years.

The first train crossed the span on October 23, 1908, and the bridge opened for regular use in November 1908. This completed the initial SP&S route, between Portland and Pasco.

Ownership and operation of the bridge passed to the Burlington Northern Railroad (BN) in 1970, when SP&S, Northern Pacific and other railroads merged to form BN. At the end of 1996, BN merged with the Atchison, Topeka and Santa Fe Railway (Santa Fe), becoming the Burlington Northern and Santa Fe Railway (officially shortened to BNSF Railway in 2005).

== Operation ==
The swing span is located at the bridge's north end, in Washington, a short distance from the Vancouver Amtrak station. All trains using the bridge are required to call the bridge tender to obtain permission to cross. A bridge tender is on duty 24 hours a day, year-round. Boats requesting an opening should contact the bridge over VHF channel 13 using call sign KQ 9049.

The bridge's swing span is opened for river traffic an average of 12 times per day.

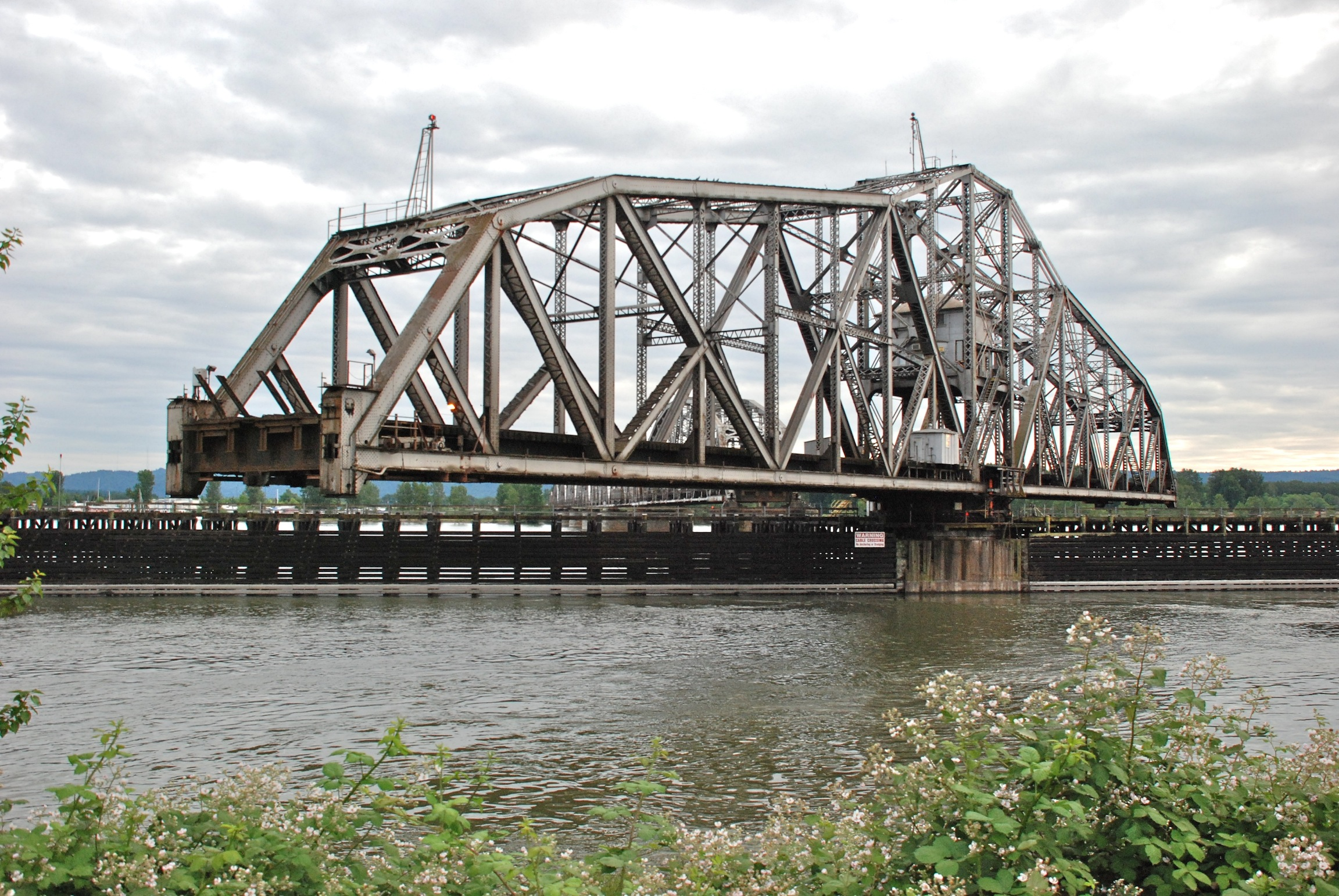
The swing span in mid-turn

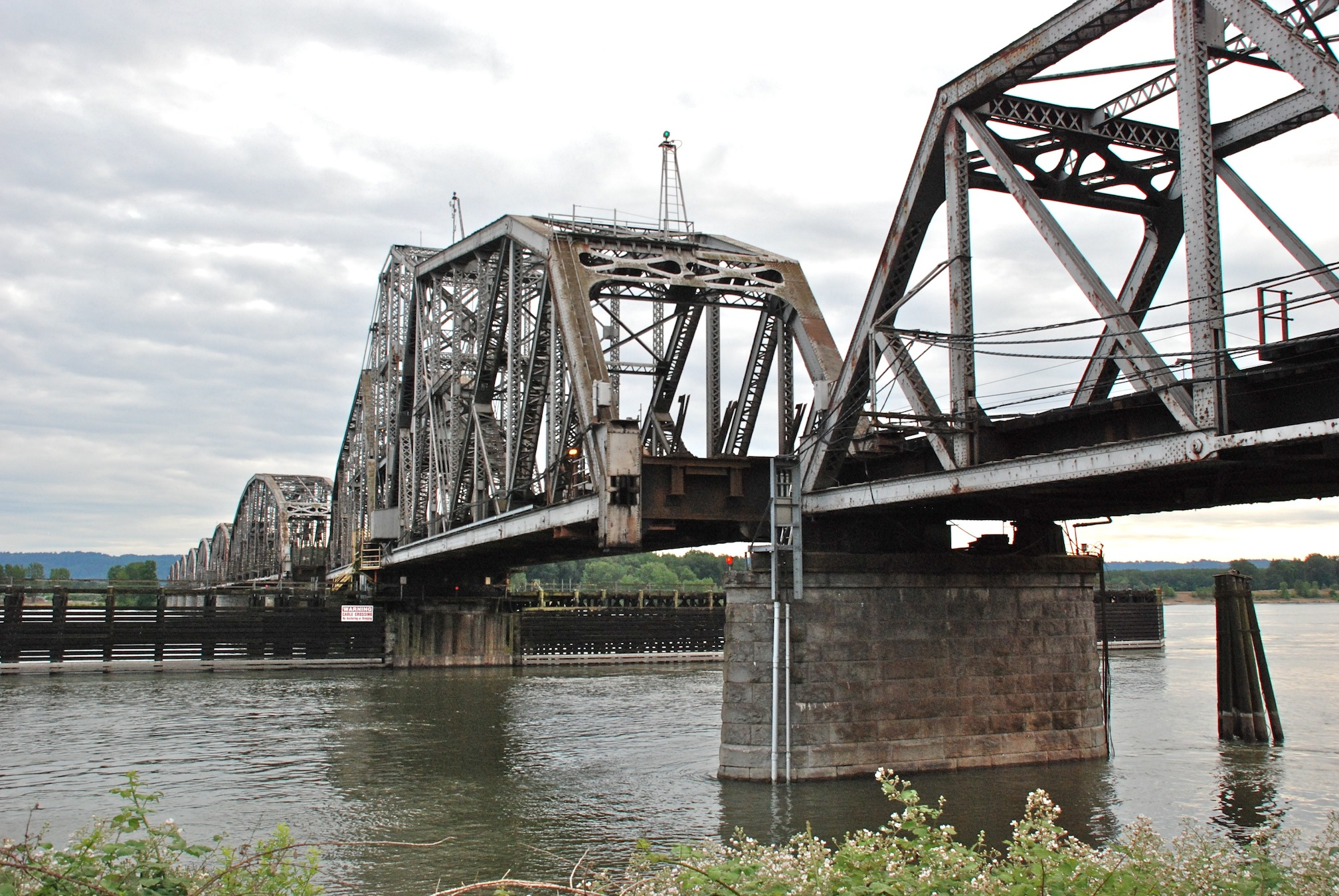
The swing span turned slightly, while closing

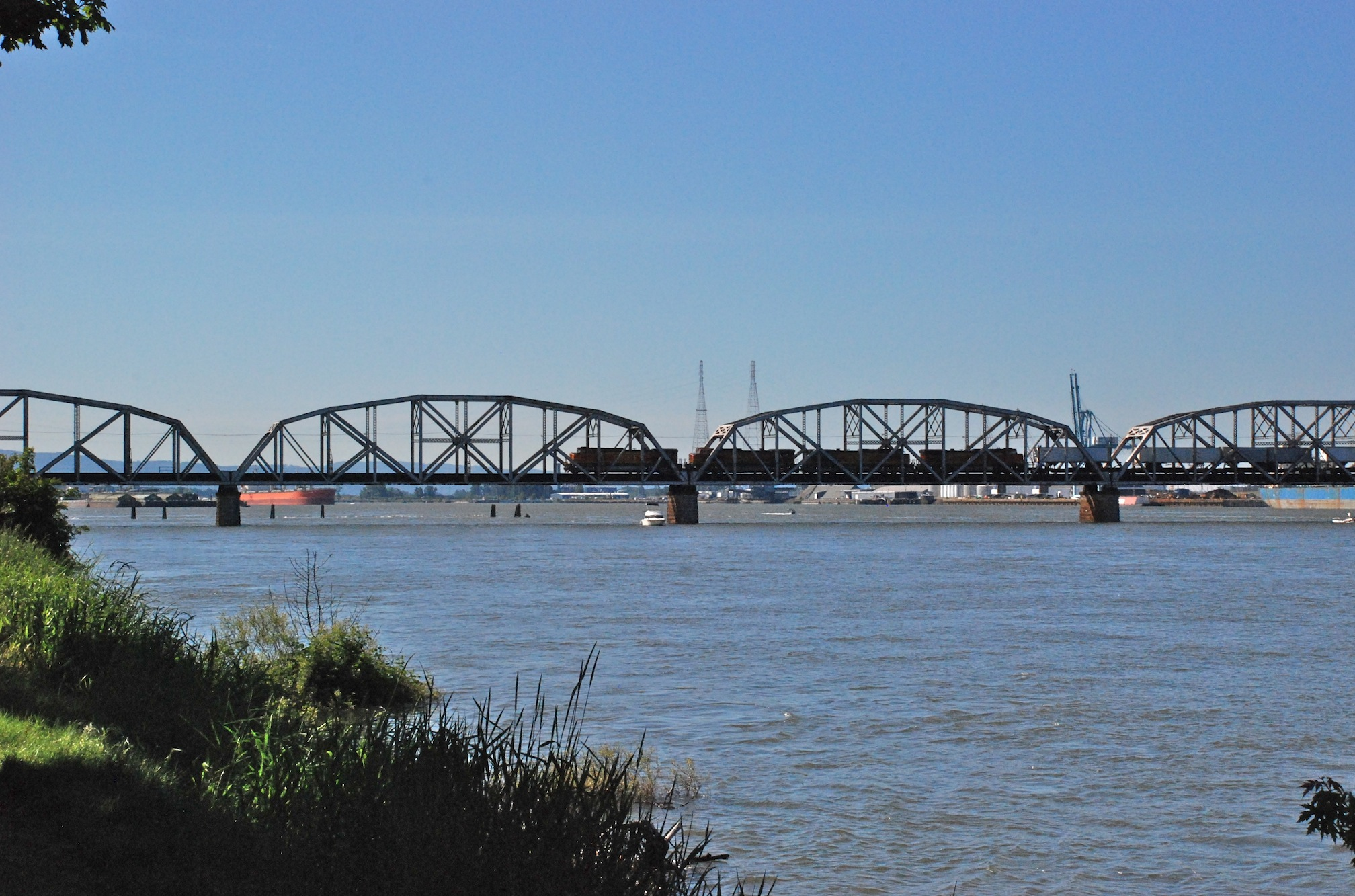
A train crossing the fixed-span section

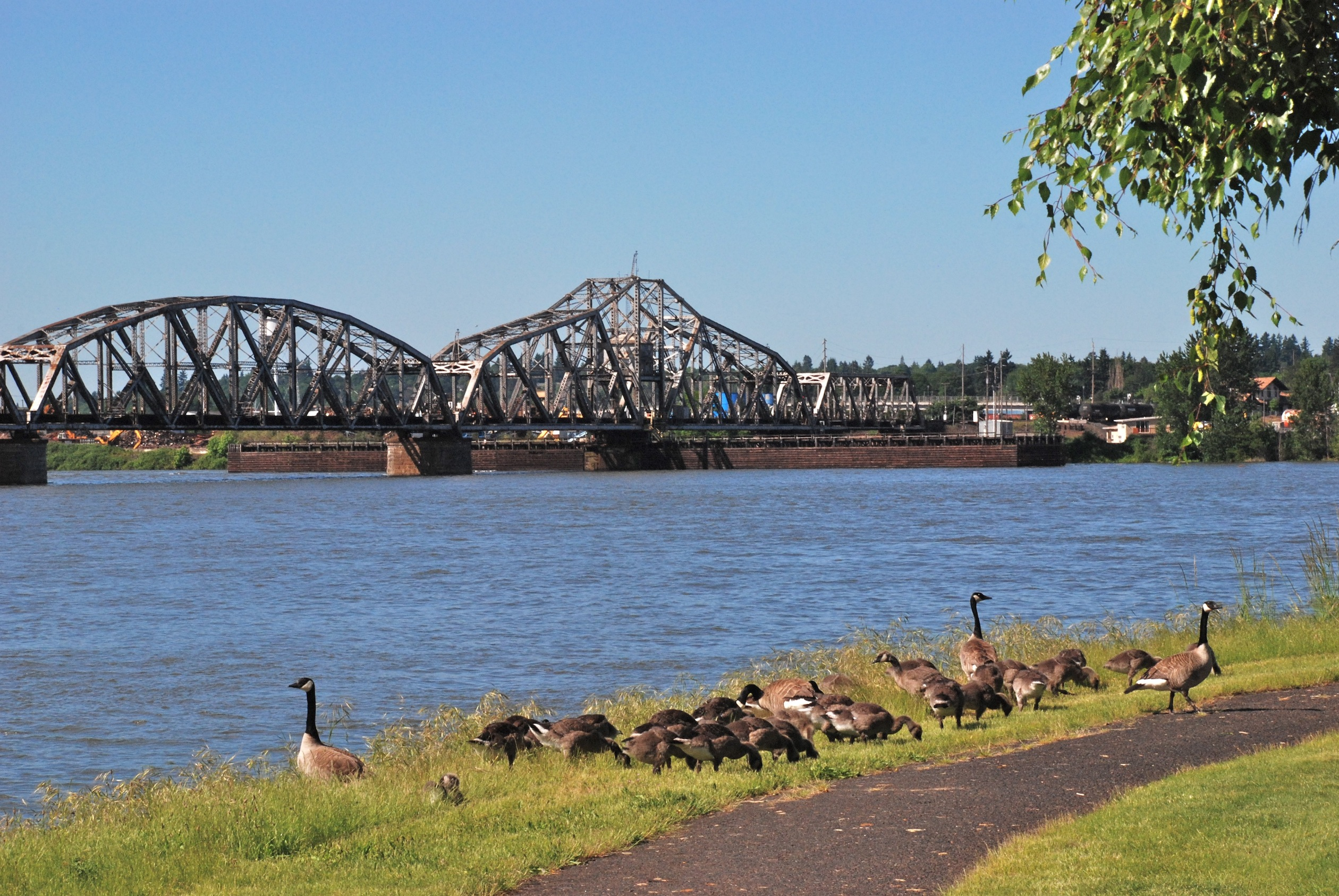
View from the Oregon shore

== See also ==
- North Bank Depot Buildings
