= Boxcar Rapids =

- Interactive map of Boxcar Rapids
- Location: South of Maupin, Oregon (river mile 44)
- Coordinates: 45.152984°N 121.108955°W
- Type: class 3 rapids
- Elevation: 760 feet (230 m)
- Average width: 75 feet (23 m)

The Boxcar Rapids (or Box Car Rapids) are Class 3 rapids on the Deschutes River, located south and upriver from Maupin, Oregon, United States.

== History ==
The rapids were named the Boxcar Rapids in January 1954, when Engine No. 857 on the Oregon Trunk Line of the Spokane, Portland and Seattle Railway turned a curve in the railroad and hit a rock slide. The engine hit it hard, derailing all three locomotives and all twelve boxcars, and because the railroad is built on the side of the steep valley's hills, two cars (one locomotive and one boxcar) tumbled into the river. The boxcar was visible in the middle of the rapid. It took over two weeks to get a line on the engine and another two to pull it out of the Deschutes. The engine, fire car, boxcar, and all of the train crew were lost in the deep, turbulent water, and the crash was one of the worst in the history of the Oregon Trunk Line. Shortly after, the rapids were named the "Boxcar Rapids." An earlier train derailing accident occurred in the lower Deschutes area in September 1949.

== The rapids today ==
Boxcar Rapids is very heavily traveled compared to other rapids, especially from whitewater rafting tours from Maupin. The rapids are turbulent and have large waves, and a small but noticeable drop. There is also a small ledge drop that leads to a hole on the left side.

Nearby Wapinitia Rapids (also a Class 3) is named after a Warm Springs word, the correct spelling of which should be wapinita. The term is difficult to translate, but suggests a location near the edge of something, especially the edge of a desert or cultivated land. Wapinitia Creek empties into the Deschutes south of Maupin.
