= BNSF Railway Bridge 5.1 =

Railroad bridge in Portland, Oregon

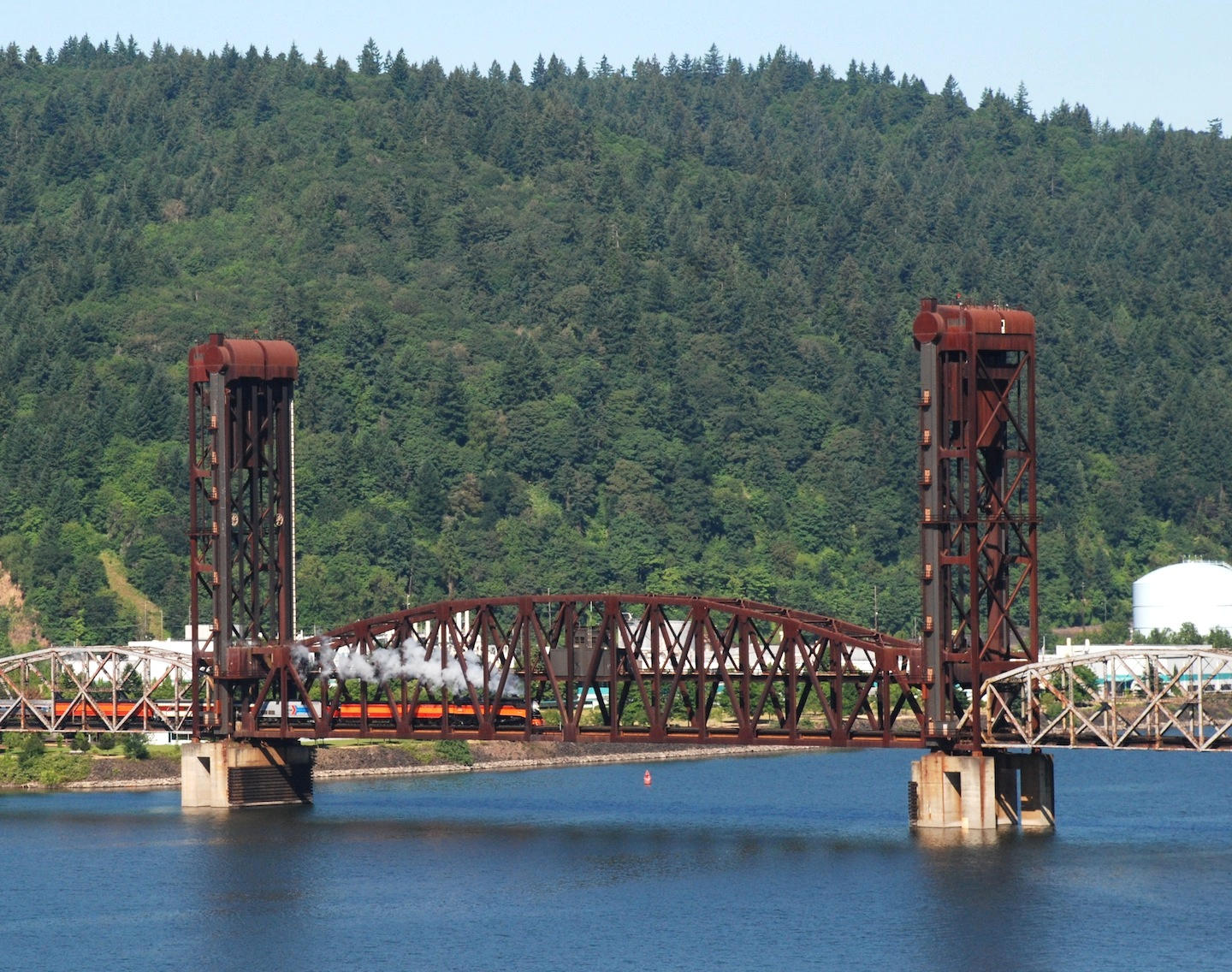
- Coordinates: 45.57730°N 122.74678°W
- Carries: Freight trains and Amtrak passenger trains toward Seattle or Spokane
- Crosses: Willamette River
- Locale: Portland, Oregon
- Owner: BNSF Railway

Characteristics
- Design: 1989 to present: Vertical-lift bridge 1908–89: Swing bridge
- Total length: 1,763 feet (537 m)
- Longest span: 516 feet (157 m)
- No. of spans: 5
- Clearance below: 200 feet (61 m) when lift span fully raised

Rail characteristics
- No. of tracks: 2

History
- Designer: Ralph Modjeski
- Opened: 1908; main span replaced 1989

Location
- Interactive map of BNSF Railway Bridge 5.1

The BNSF Railway Bridge 5.1, also known as the St. Johns Railroad Bridge or the Willamette River Railroad Bridge, is a through truss railway bridge with a vertical lift that spans the Willamette River in Portland, Oregon, United States. Built by the Spokane, Portland and Seattle Railway (SP&S) and completed in 1908, it was originally a swing-span bridge, and its swing-span section was the longest in the world at the time. However, 81 years later the main span was converted from a swing-type to a vertical-lift type, in order to widen the navigation channel. The lift span is one of the highest and longest in the world. The bridge consists of five sections, with the two sections closest to the bank on each side fixed.

The BNSF Railway owns the bridge, and the 5.1 denotes the distance in miles from Portland's Union Station or from the nearby North Bank Depot (or Hoyt Street Depot), which was the Portland terminus of SP&S passenger service coming via this bridge until 1922. The bridge's two tracks are used by freight trains of BNSF and Union Pacific Railroad and by Amtrak passenger trains. Of 12 bridges across the Willamette River within the city of Portland, it is the sole rail-only bridge and the only bridge not open to the public. It is located at river mile 6.9.

== History ==
The original, swing-span bridge was built in 1906–08 by the Spokane, Portland and Seattle Railway (SP&S), as part of construction of a new line between Vancouver, Washington and Portland. SP&S was formed jointly by the Northern Pacific Railway and Great Northern Railway, originally as the Portland & Seattle Railway, to build and ultimately operate new railroad lines from Portland to Seattle and Portland to Spokane, but was renamed Spokane, Portland & Seattle Railway—in early 1908, before opening any track sections—after construction of the Portland–Spokane line got under way before the Seattle line. The planned new railroad was commonly referred to as the "North Bank road" (road being short for railroad or railroad line), or North Bank line, because the Seattle line would follow the Columbia River's north bank as far as Kelso and the Spokane line would also follow the north bank, running east from Vancouver. East from Portland, the south bank of the Columbia already had a rail line, owned by the Oregon Railroad and Navigation Company (later absorbed by Union Pacific Railroad).

=== Design and construction ===
The new Portland–Vancouver rail line also included two other major bridges, the Columbia River Railroad Bridge (now known as BNSF Railway Bridge 9.6) and the Oregon Slough Railroad Bridge. Northern Pacific hired bridge engineer Ralph Modjeski in 1905 to design all three. Modjeski's designs called for all three to use swing spans for their opening sections. However, for the Willamette crossing, this recommendation was met with resistance by some. River boat pilots were concerned that a swing span, which requires a center pivot pier, would leave too-narrow a navigation channel for the large ships that used this section of the river. At that time, Portland's Steel, Burnside, Morrison and Madison Street bridges were all swing-type, with center pivot piers seen by boat pilots as inconvenient obstacles. The Port of Portland organized a committee in January 1906 to determine the feasibility of a bascule-type draw span by inspecting existing bascule bridges in Chicago and other eastern cities. Modjeski and a group of Portland engineers declared a bascule design to be impractical, and the president of the Portland & Seattle Railway stated his preference for a swing draw "as being more serviceable and reliable and better adapted to the river channel." After undertaking their inspection, the Port of Portland committee also concluded that a bascule design would be impractical. The original recommendation for a swing span was ultimately accepted, and plans for the bridge were sent to the Secretary of War for approval in May 1906.

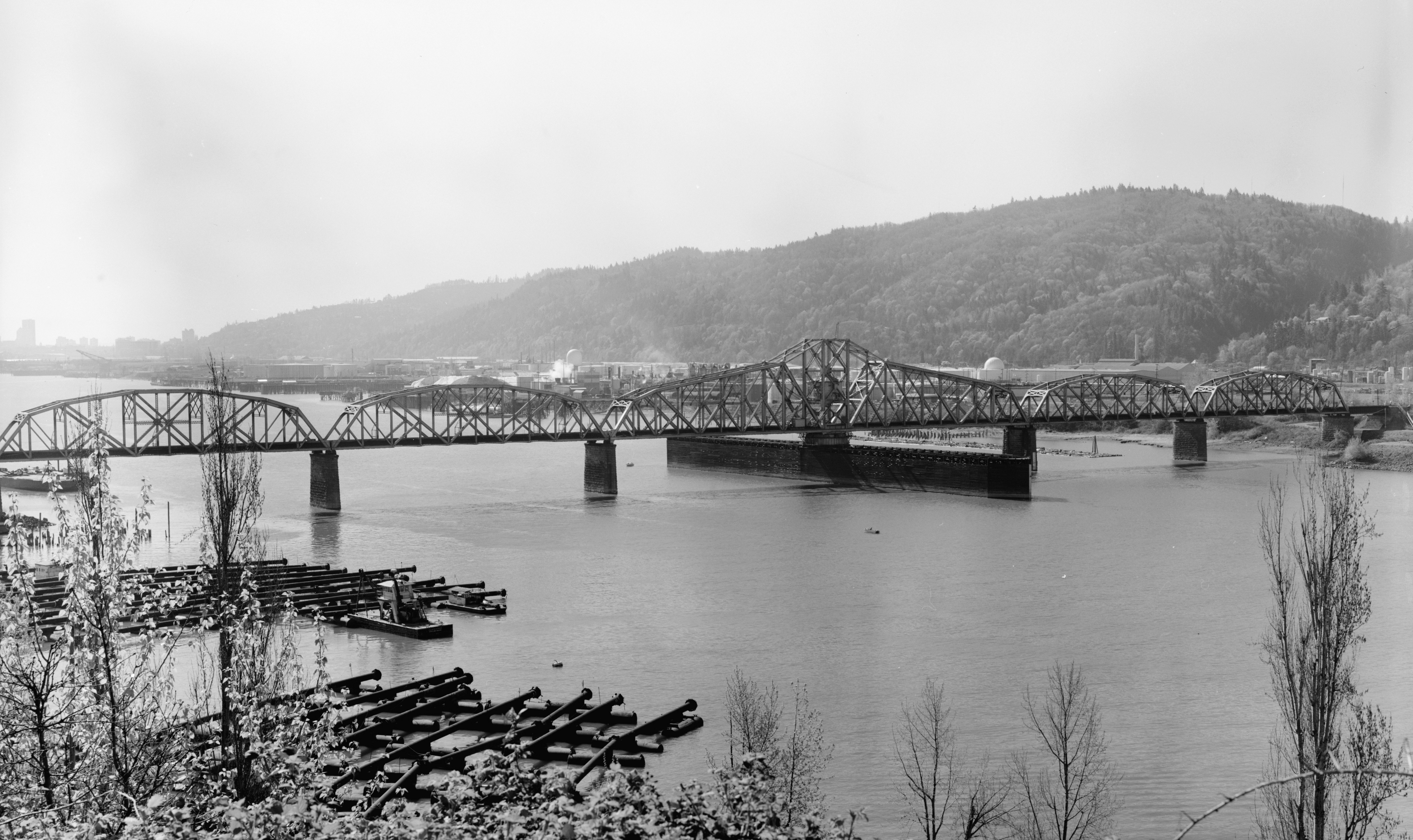
Until 1989, the bridge had a swing span, rather than a vertical-lift span.

Construction of the Willamette River bridge began in August 1906. Its swing-span section was the longest in the world, with a length of 521 feet (158.8 m) or 524 feet (159.7 m). To either side of the opening span are two 269-foot-long (82 m) fixed truss spans and one 80-foot-long (24 m) deck plate girder approach span.

Overall, the construction took more than two years. Structural work was completed in July 1908, and the first test swing of the center span was accomplished by a tugboat pushing on it, as the heavy machinery for that purpose had yet to be installed. Problems with the supply and installation of parts of the machinery for turning the swing span caused a delay of a few months, and not until October was the span turned for the first time under its own power. The first train crossed on October 23, 1908, and the bridge opened for regular use in November. The Spokane, Portland and Seattle Railway's first scheduled passenger train on the new line into and out of Portland operated on November 17, 1908, and the terminus in Portland was the North Bank Depot on N.W. Hoyt Street at 11th Avenue, rather than Union Station. SP&S service moved to Union Station in 1922.

The total weight of the swing span was around 4.6 million pounds, including 400,000 pounds for the machinery. In the event of a power outage, the bridge's swing span could still be turned, using a 165-hp, four-cylinder back-up generator to power the electric motors. The drum on which the span pivoted was 42 feet (13 m) in diameter.

Ownership and operation of the bridge passed to the Burlington Northern Railroad (BN) in 1970, when SP&S, Northern Pacific and other railroads merged to form BN. At the end of 1996, BN merged with the Atchison, Topeka and Santa Fe Railway (Santa Fe), becoming the Burlington Northern and Santa Fe Railway (officially shortened to BNSF Railway in 2005).

== Accidents ==
The bridge sustained heavy damage on October 29, 1978, when it was struck by a Norwegian container ship, the m.v. Marie Bakke. The ship hit the downstream end of the swing span, which had been in the fully open position; that was its normal position, as the span was closed only when trains needed to cross. Repairs took seven weeks, not being completed until January 1979. Meanwhile, BN and Amtrak trains had to be rerouted via Union Pacific tracks and across the Steel Bridge to reach the west side of the river. BN filed suit against the shipping line that owned the vessel, charging negligence and seeking damages, and ultimately reached an out-of-court settlement under which it received about $3.5 million from the shipping company.

On New Year's Eve 1983, at about 10:25 p.m., two locomotives heading a BN freight train plunged into the river through the open swing span, resulting in the deaths of two crew members. It was the worst train-related accident in the bridge's history. The cause was determined to have been human error, that the train crew had passed a red signal.

== Rebuilding as vertical-lift bridge ==
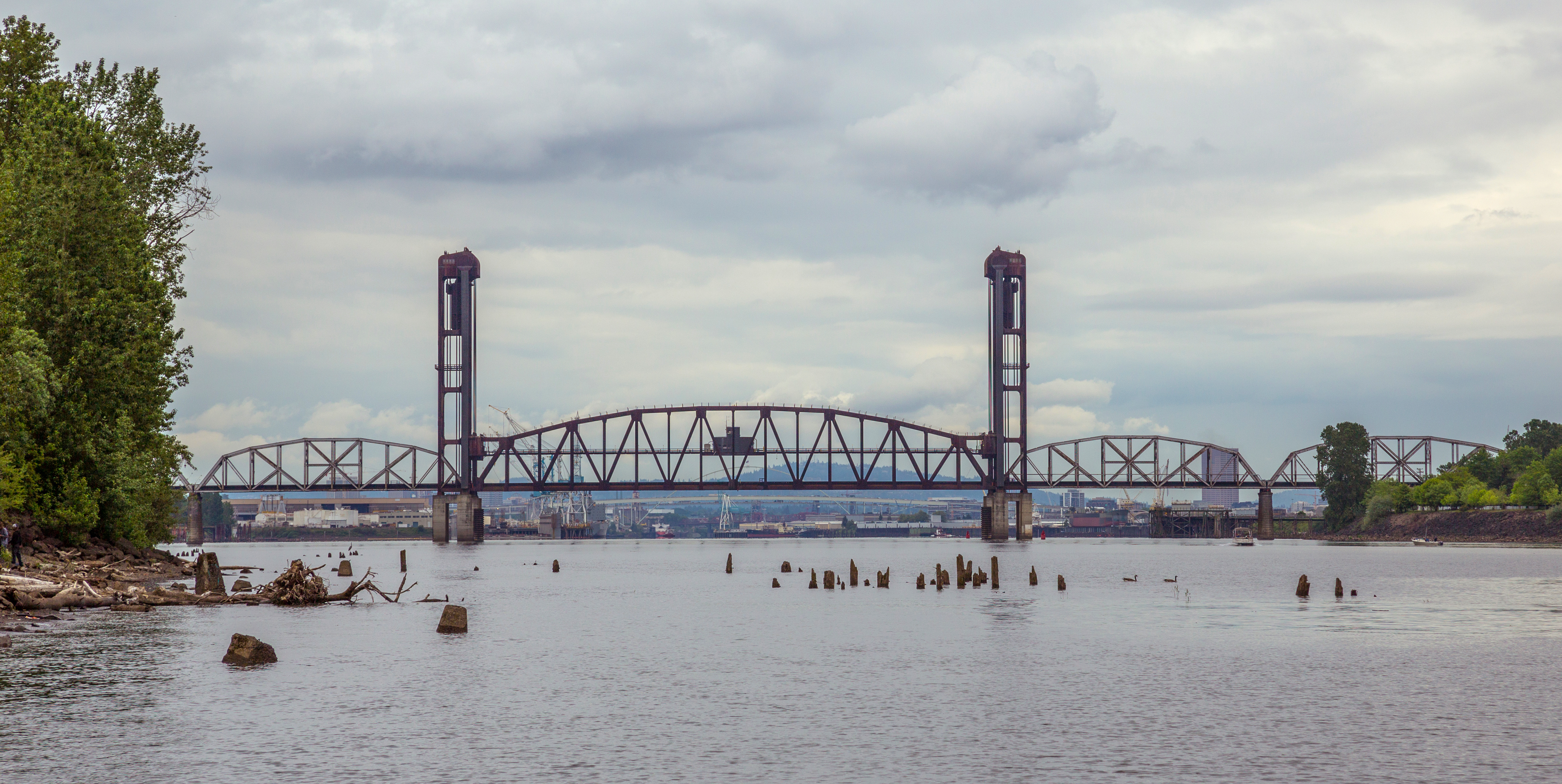
Overall view of the bridge from the northwest, with the lift span in the lowered position

The center swing span was replaced by a vertical-lift span and towers in a two-year project completed in 1989, funded primarily by a federal grant. Prior to this change, numerous ships had struck the bridge over the years, the worst incident being the 1978 one described above, and the bridge's center pier ultimately was deemed an impediment to river navigation. That assessment was made by the U.S. Coast Guard, and it led to Congressional approval of a $38 million grant to pay for the work. Conversion to a vertical lift permitted the central pivot pier to be removed, greatly widening the navigation channel. In addition to increasing safety, the wider clearance would allow larger ships to reach the Port of Portland's then-new (1978) dry dock facility for ship repair and rebuilding at Swan Island, and Port officials cited both of these benefits in their support of the planned change. After design and engineering were completed, a $28 million contract was awarded in May 1987 to Portland-based Riedel International Inc. to carry out the work. The Coast Guard financed most of the cost of the conversion, but Burlington Northern paid about 3 percent of the cost.

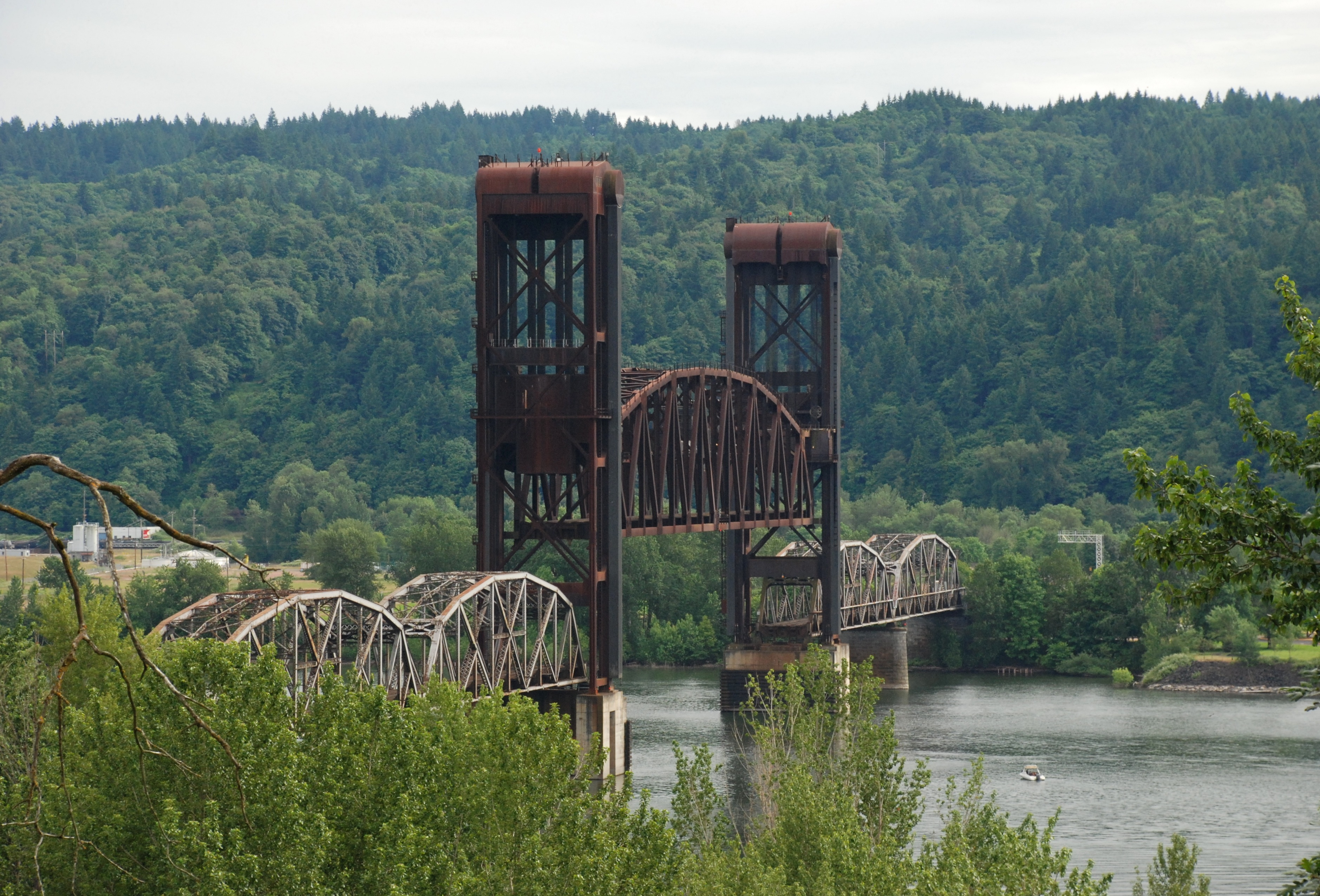
The lift span partially raised

In order to minimize disruption to both river traffic and rail traffic, the project was carefully coordinated to allow the change to be made over just 72 hours. This work began on August 8, 1989, with removal of the 81-year-old swing-span section, and was completed on August 11. The pivot pier was removed by dynamite blasting three months later, after the fall fish run, and with that final step the navigation channel was widened from 230 feet (70 m) to 497 feet (151 m).

The 516-foot-long (157 m) lift span is one of the longest vertical-lift spans in the world and is also the fourth-highest in the world. When fully raised, it provides vertical clearance of 200 feet (61 m) at low water. The new lift span weighs 7,900,000 pounds (3,600,000 kg). It is made of weathering steel, which is designed to rust naturally and thus turn a reddish brown. However, the remainder of the bridge, the fixed spans dating from 1908, are painted silver. This has given the rebuilt structure two distinct colors, and the unusual combination has been called unattractive by some.

== Operation ==
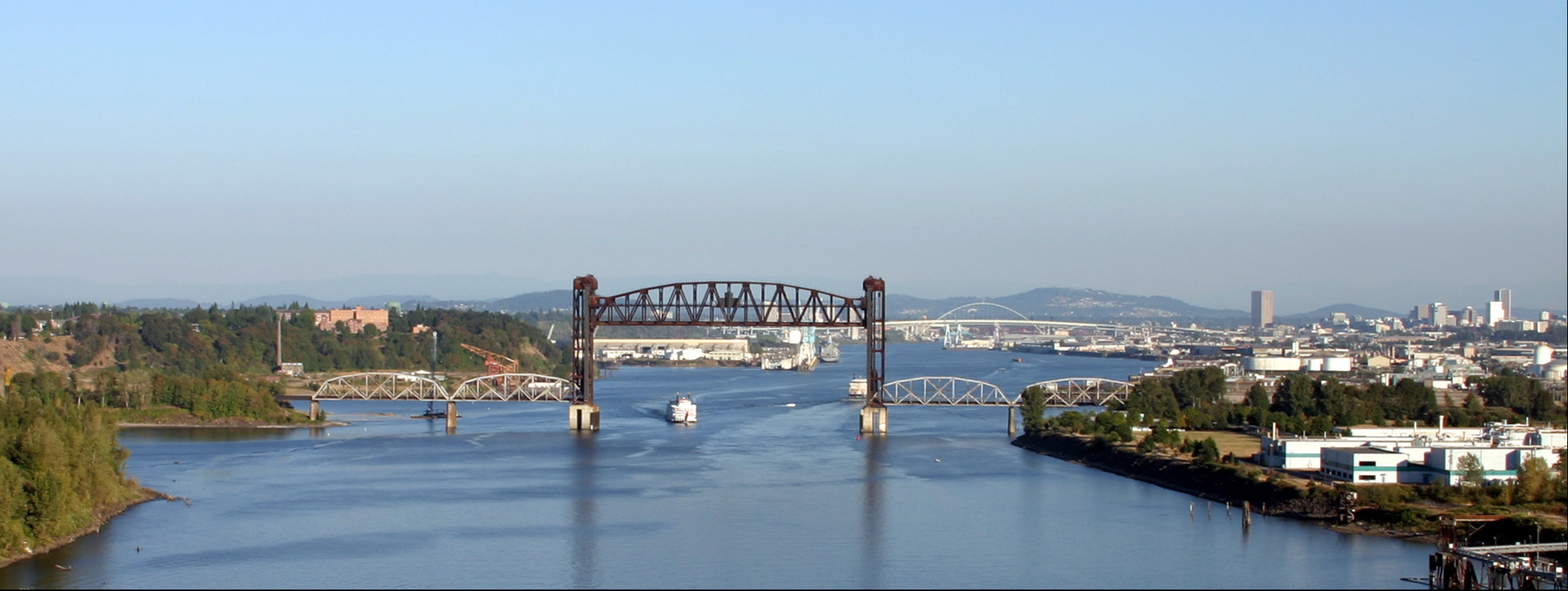
View from the nearby St. Johns Bridge, looking southeast

The bridge carries two tracks across the Willamette River and is used by freight trains and Amtrak trains. Although BNSF Railway owns and controls the bridge, the company is required to allow access to other railroads, under a law already in force by 1906 allowing common use of railway bridges across navigable waterways. Signals on both approaches prevent trains from entering the bridge when the lift span is up, but as a precaution, all trains are still required to radio the bridge tender to obtain permission to cross. A bridge tender is on duty 24 hours a day, year-round.

The bridge is crossed by about 30 to 35 trains per day.

== See also ==
- List of bridges documented by the Historic American Engineering Record in Oregon
- List of crossings of the Willamette River
