= North Portland Harbor =

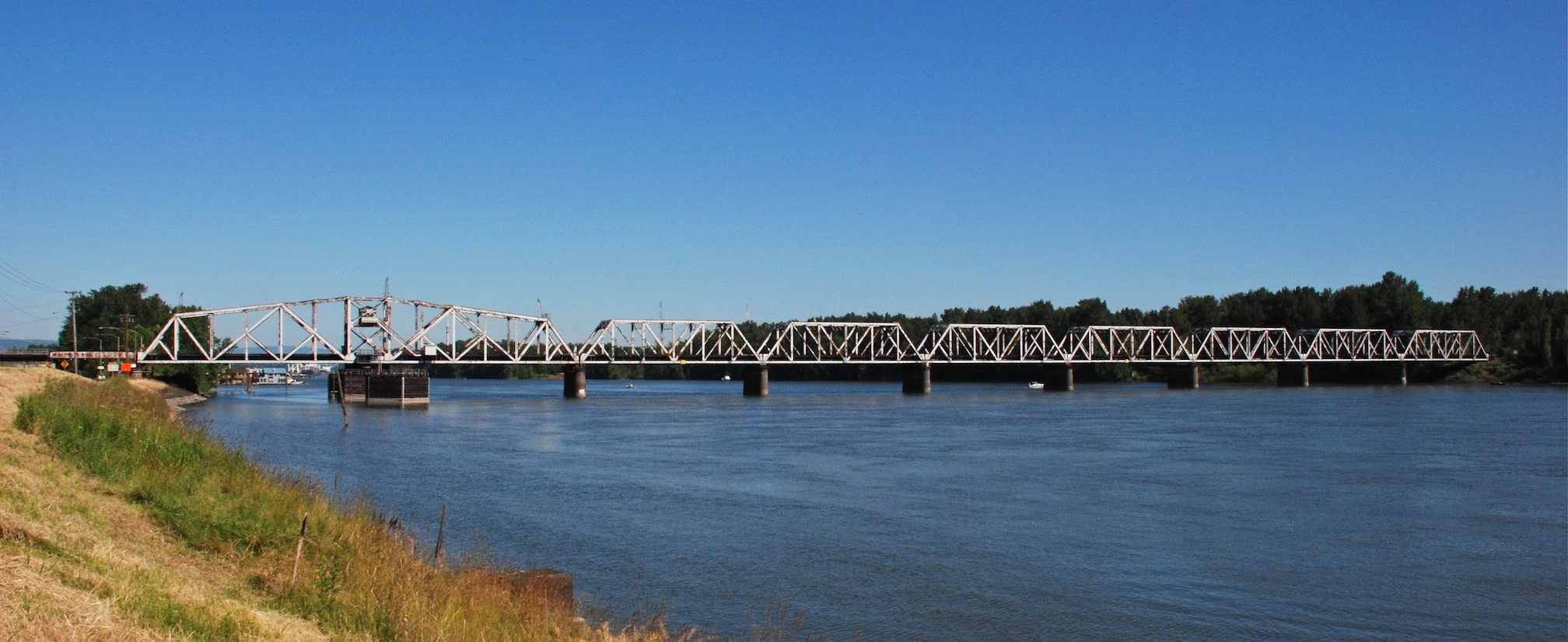
- Railroad bridge over the channel

- Location of the mouth of North Portland Harbor in Oregon

Location
- Country: United States
- State: Oregon
- County, City: Multnomah, Portland

Physical characteristics
- Source: Columbia River
  - location: about 108 miles (174 km) from the Columbia mouth
- Mouth: Columbia River
  - location: about 103 miles (166 km) from the Columbia mouth
  - coordinates: 45°37′48″N 122°43′54″W
  - elevation: 10 ft (3.0 m)
- Length: 5 mi (8.0 km)

The North Portland Harbor is an Oregon waterway or channel in Multnomah County, specifically in Portland. An anabranch, about 5 miles (8 km) long, of the Columbia River, it separates Hayden and Tomahawk islands from the mainland. Flowing generally northwest, the channel rejoins the main stem slightly upstream of Kelley Point Park and the mouth of the Willamette River.

The Interstate Bridge carries Interstate 5 (I-5) over the channel, and farther downstream the Oregon Slough Railroad Bridge carries rail traffic. The BNSF Railway crosses North Portland Harbor over the rail bridge.

Terminal 6 of the Port of Portland lies along the mainland shore of the channel. Northeast Marine Drive runs roughly parallel to the channel for much of its length.

The official name registered with the United States Board on Geographic Names is North Portland Harbor, although historically other names have been applied. These include Oregon Slough and Hayden Slough.

== See also ==
- List of rivers of Oregon
