= North Bank Depot Buildings =

Historic buildings in Portland, Oregon, U.S.

- U.S. National Register of Historic Places
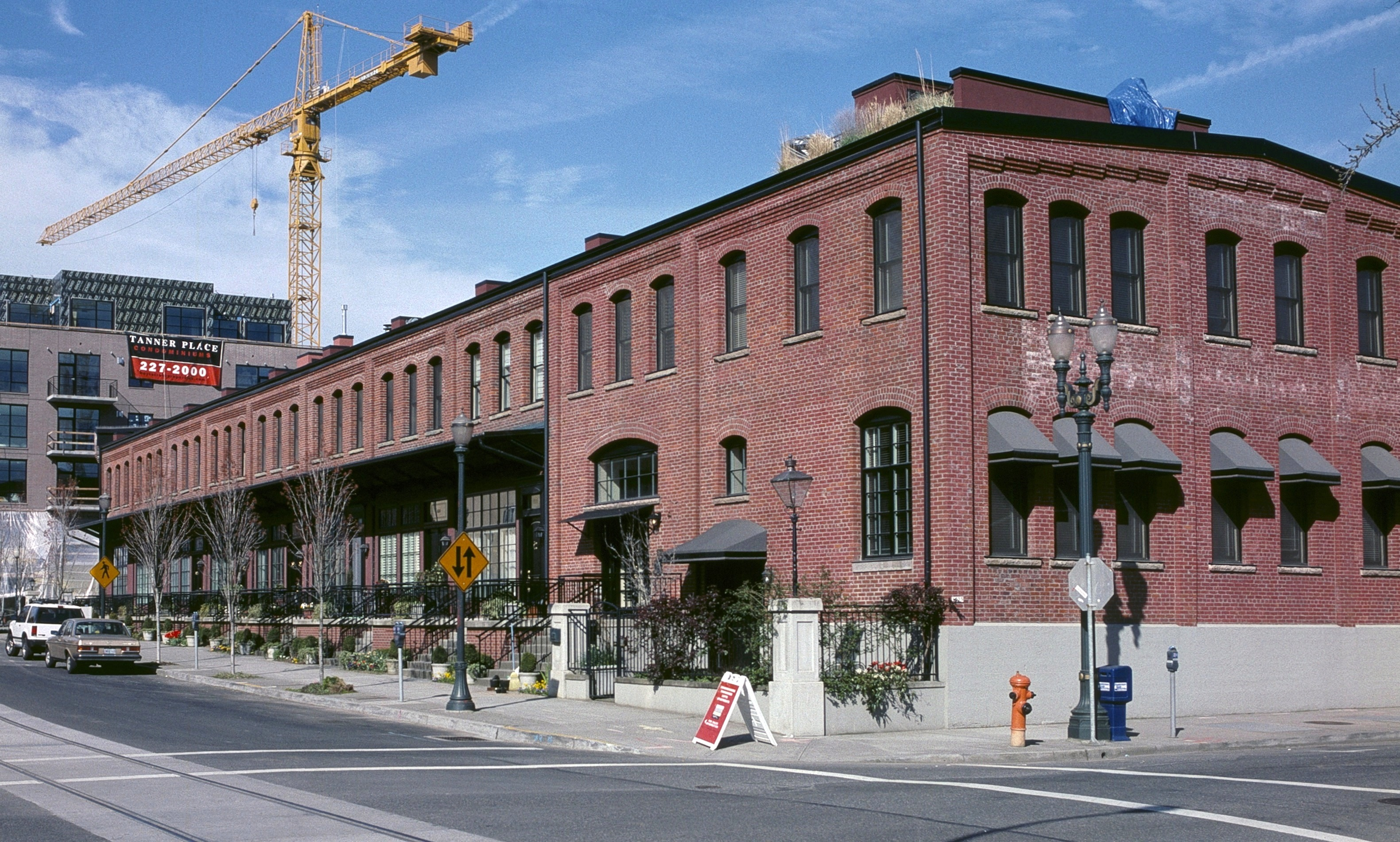
- The east building's exterior in 2000

- Location within Portland, Oregon Location within Oregon Location within the United States
- Location: 1029–1101 NW Hoyt Street; Portland, Oregon
- Coordinates: 45°31′39.3″N 122°40′56.3″W
- Area: 0.86 acres (0.35 ha)
- Built: 1908
- Architectural style: Chicago
- NRHP reference No.: 96000124
- Added to NRHP: February 22, 1996

The North Bank Depot Buildings, in central Portland, Oregon, United States, are a pair of buildings formerly used as a freight warehouse and passenger terminal for the Spokane, Portland and Seattle Railway (SP&S). Formed in 1905, the SP&S was commonly known as the North Bank Road (or North Bank road, "road" being short for railroad) during the period in which these buildings were in use. The Portland buildings' passenger facilities were also used by the Oregon Electric Railway after that railway was acquired by the SP&S. Located in what is now known as the Pearl District, the buildings were listed on the National Register of Historic Places in 1996. They were in use by the SP&S and its successor, Burlington Northern Railroad, from 1908 until the 1980s. Only the east building was used as a passenger station, and this usage lasted from 1908 until 1931.

== Location ==
The two matching, two-story brick buildings face one another on opposite sides of NW 11th Avenue immediately north of Hoyt Street, the east building being at 1029 NW Hoyt Street and the west at 1101 NW Hoyt. Historically, they were known as the East and West Freighthouses of the Spokane, Portland & Seattle Railway. In references to passenger services, the east building was formally referred to as the North Bank Station (or North Bank Passenger Station), but alternatively was known by various other names, including North Bank depot, Hoyt Street depot, Hoyt Street terminal, 11th & Hoyt Streets depot, 10th & Hoyt depot, or similar. Each building measures 50 feet (15 m) by 200 feet (61 m).

== Background ==
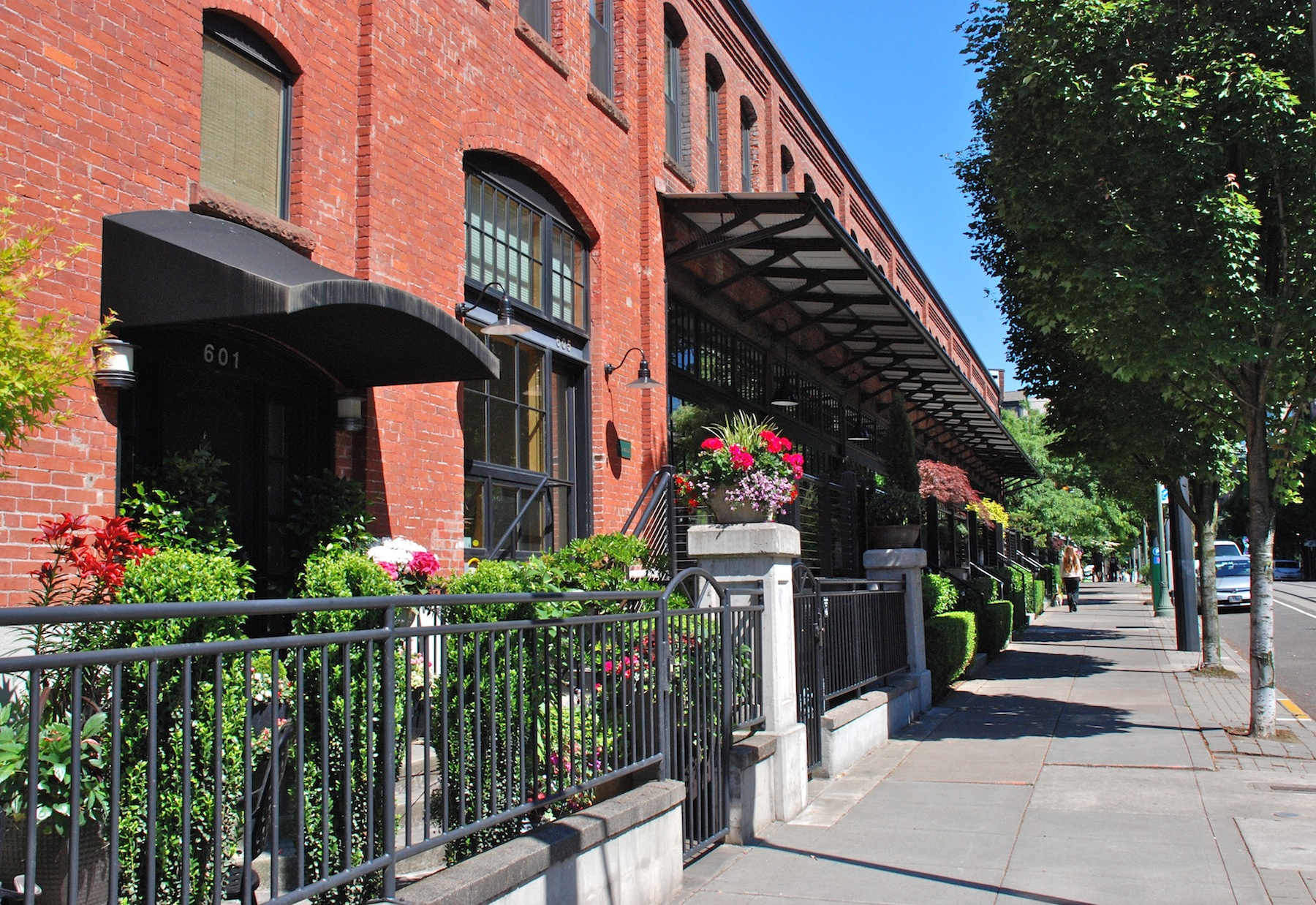
The east facade of the west building in 2011, after being converted into housing in the late 1990s. A steel awning that provided partial cover for loading docks remains in place.

The SP&S was formed jointly by the Northern Pacific Railway (NP) and Great Northern Railway in 1905, originally as the Portland & Seattle Railway, to build and ultimately operate new railroad lines connecting Portland with Seattle and with Spokane, but was renamed Spokane, Portland & Seattle Railway in early 1908, before opening any track sections. The planned new railroad was commonly referred to as the "North Bank road" (road being short for railroad or railroad line), or North Bank line, because the Seattle line would follow the Columbia River's north bank as far as Kelso and the Spokane line would also follow the north bank, running east from Vancouver. East from Portland, the south bank of the Columbia already had a rail line, owned by the Oregon Railroad and Navigation Company (later absorbed by Union Pacific Railroad).

By September 1905, Northern Pacific had already acquired the property for the future terminal buildings and rail yard—a strip of land two blocks wide, from 10th to 12th avenues, and stretching north from Hoyt Street to the Willamette River. Construction of the railroad itself began in early 1906. The new company needed freight storage and handling facilities in Portland, and to this end it built the two "freight houses" at 11th Avenue and Hoyt Street, in 1908. SP&S passenger train service was originally expected to terminate at Union Station, located about 1,600 feet (490 m) to the east, but lengthy negotiations between SP&S and Union Station's operator, the Northern Pacific Terminal Company, eventually reached an impasse. The Terminal Company was only partially owned by SP&S parent Northern Pacific Railway, and partially by competing railroads. With only a few weeks to go until passenger service to Portland was to be started, it was reported that SP&S would instead equip one of its new freight houses for use as a passenger station, in place of access to Union Station, at least temporarily.

== Period of active use ==
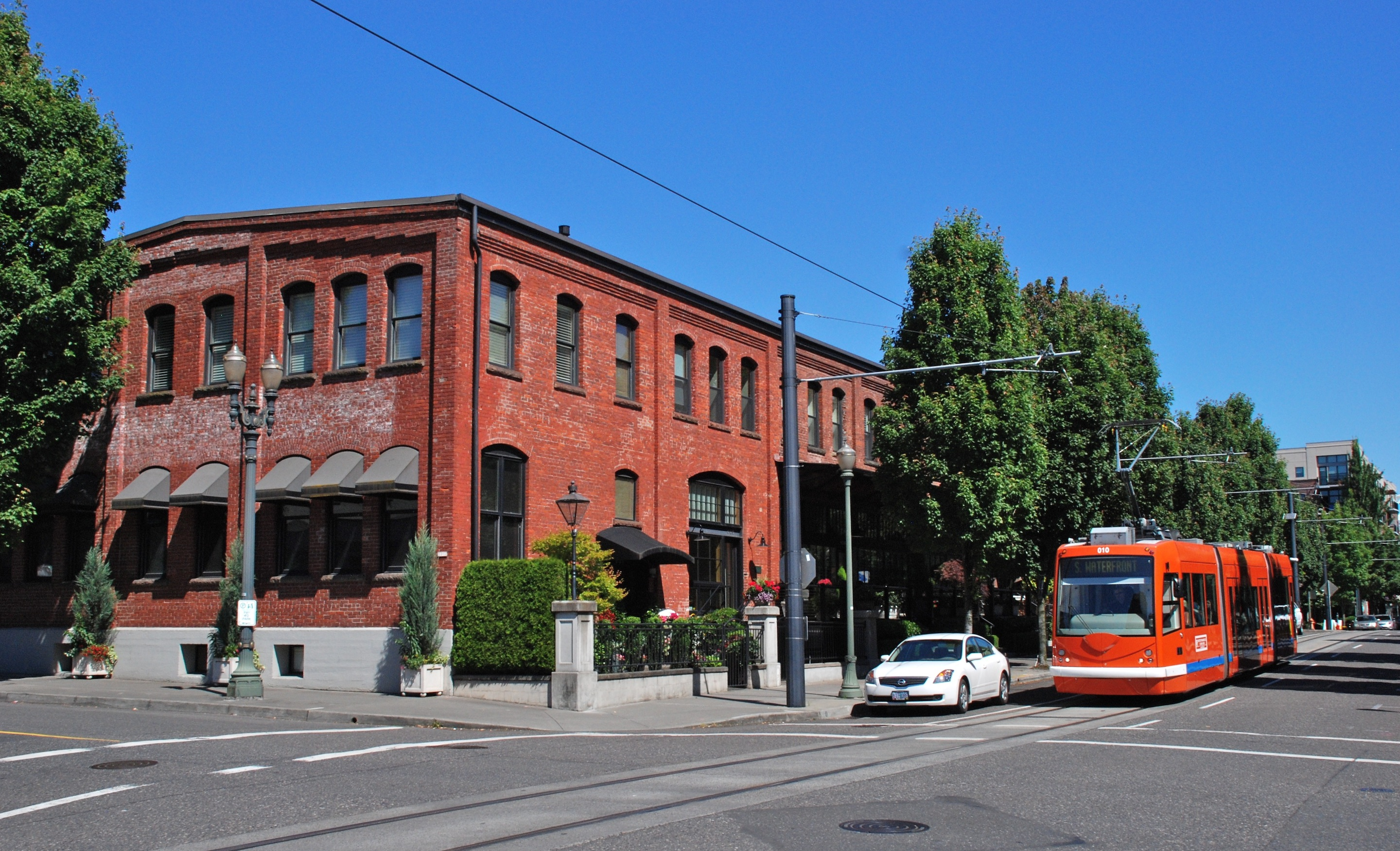
The west building in 2011

Passenger trains began using the new station—the east building, at 1029 NW Hoyt Street—in November 1908. The west building, used exclusively for freight, came into use at the same time, as SP&S initiated its operations in Portland. Trains operating from this station served routes within the Pacific Northwest, including to Seattle, Spokane and Seaside via Astoria. The Portland–Spokane train, named the Inland Empire Express, connected in Spokane with Great Northern's Oriental Limited to and from Chicago and was advertised as the "Portland–Chicago" service.

SP&S began shifting some of its passenger trains to Union Station in 1920, and additional trains were shifted in 1922, after new platforms and train sheds were constructed at Union Station for that purpose. However, only some trains used Union Station, including the long-distance services to Chicago (which began carrying through sleeping cars, Portland–Chicago, at this time), while other trains continued to use the Hoyt Street station for a time. SP&S inaugurated passenger service between Portland and Vernonia in March 1923, with two round trips per day; a passenger-only train ran to and from Union Station, but a mixed freight-passenger train operated instead from the Hoyt Street station.

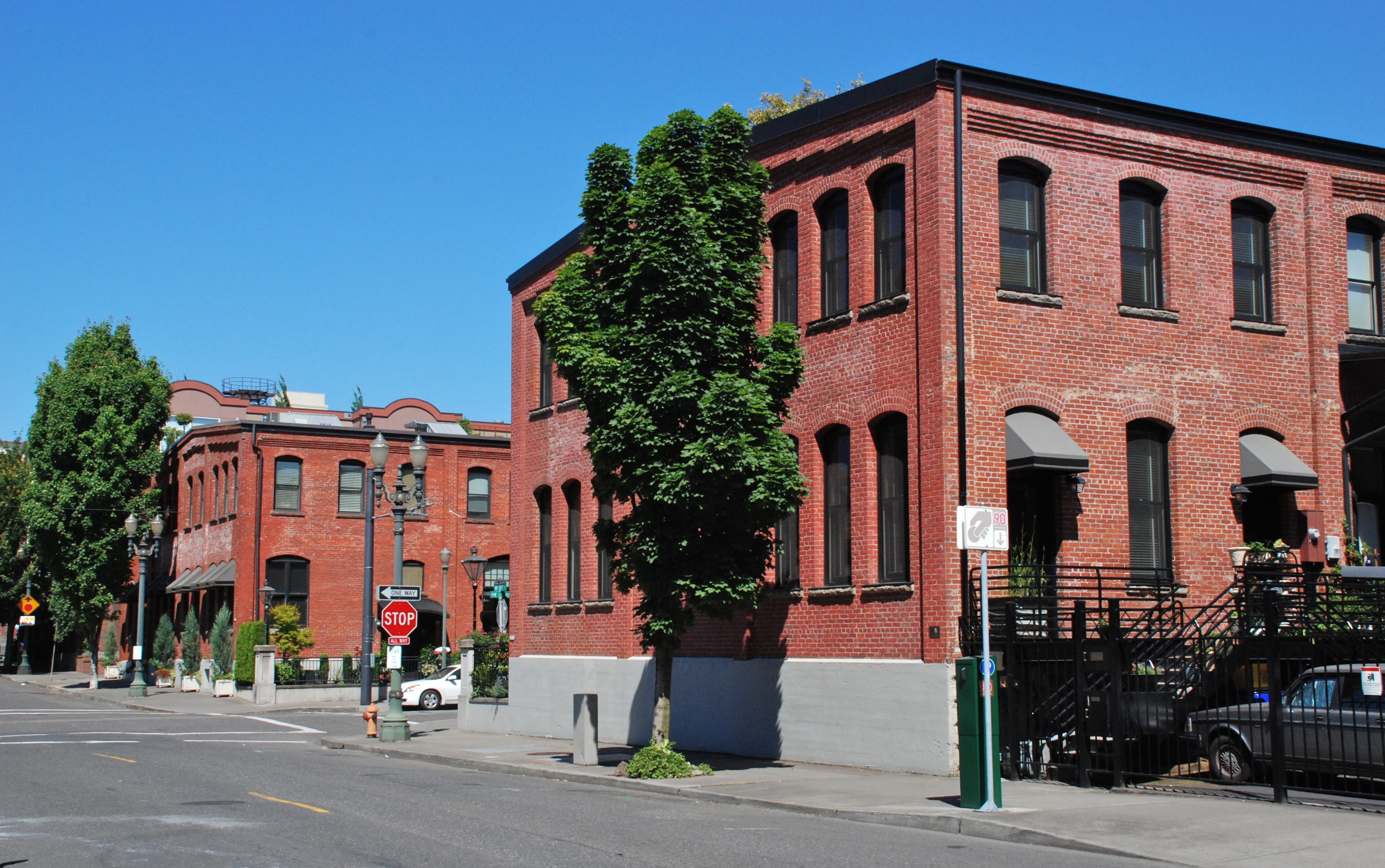
The south ends of the two matching buildings

In 1912, Oregon Electric Railway (OE) interurban passenger trains began serving the North Bank Depot, after that company laid new track through downtown Portland along Salmon Street and 10th Avenue to reach the terminal. OE was owned by SP&S (acquired in 1910). Electric interurbans departed from this station on journeys west to Hillsboro and Forest Grove, and south through the Willamette Valley to Salem and Eugene.

The last OE service to this station operated on June 19, 1931, after the company requested, and received, permission from the Interstate Commerce Commission to abandon that section of route because of declining ridership and worsening traffic congestion. The service was cut back to Front and Jefferson streets the following day, and OE moved its ticket office to that location. The tracks along 10th and Salmon streets were abandoned and soon removed. Just two years later, in May 1933, the Oregon Electric discontinued all its remaining passenger service, becoming exclusively a freight railroad.

SP&S was merged with other railroads in 1970 to form Burlington Northern Railroad (BN). The former North Bank Depot Buildings continued to be used by the railroad for freight purposes until the 1980s, and then were vacant for a time, until at least the mid-1990s.

== Preservation and conversion ==
During the course of the 1980s, usage of the railroad yards adjacent to and north of the two now-Burlington Northern-owned warehouses declined to the point of their being nearly vacant. Redevelopment of the area as a mixed-use neighborhood with residential and retail uses was envisioned, and in 1989, the Portland Planning Commission approved a rezoning of a 40-acre (16 ha) tract, along with a master plan to foster such change. By then, the Glacier Park Company, a property-development subsidiary of Burlington Resources, had taken over the former North Bank Depot Buildings from BN, and it was reported that the new master plan for the area would include renovation of these two Hoyt Street warehouses.

In November 1990, Glacier Park sold the 40-acre site to a Portland-based development company, Prendergast & Associates. It was determined that extensive clean-up of contaminated soil from decades of industrial use would be needed before most redevelopment could proceed. Prendergast & Associates were predicting an approximately 20-year timeframe for redevelopment of the entire area of former railyards and associated buildings. The two former-SP&S freighthouses were listed on the National Register of Historic Places in 1996, as the North Bank Depot Buildings. At that time, they were vacant and had not yet been renovated. In the late 1990s, they were renovated and converted for residential use.

== See also ==
- Architecture of Portland, Oregon
- National Register of Historic Places listings in Northwest Portland, Oregon
- Rail transportation in the United States

Preceding station	Spokane, Portland and Seattle Railway	Following station
Terminus	Main Line until 1931	St. Johns toward Spokane: Great Northern or Northern Pacific
Preceding station	Oregon Electric Railway	Following station
10th & Stark toward Eugene	Main Line	Terminus
