= Willamina, Oregon =

City in Oregon, U.S.

- City
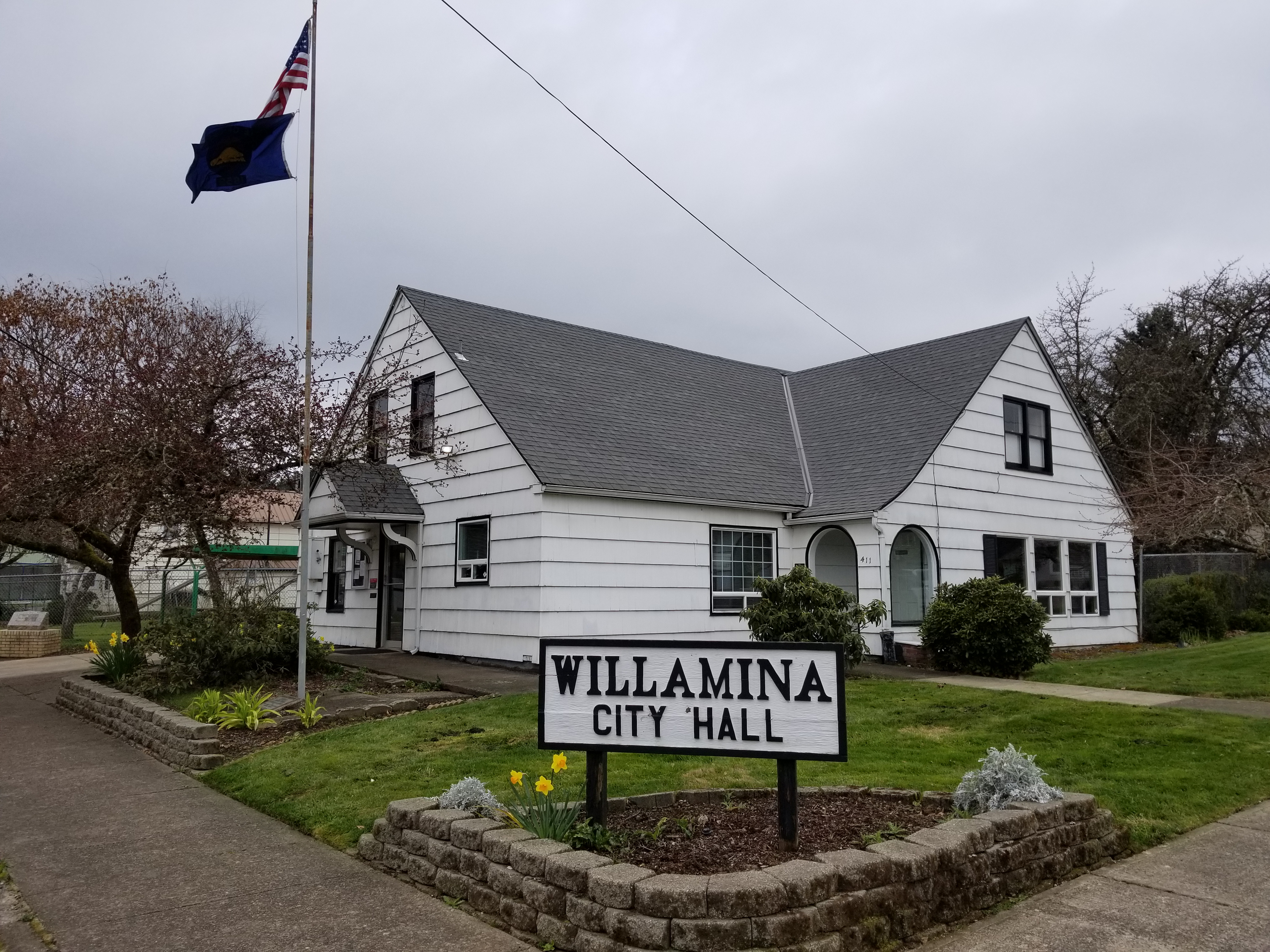
- Willamina City Hall
- Nickname: Timbertown, USA
- Location in Oregon
- Coordinates: 45°04′42″N 123°29′05″W
- Country: United States
- State: Oregon
- Counties: Yamhill, Polk
- Incorporated: 1903

Government
  - Mayor: Vickie Hernandez

Area
  - Total: 0.98 sq mi (2.55 km^{2})
  - Land: 0.95 sq mi (2.45 km^{2})
  - Water: 0.042 sq mi (0.11 km^{2})
- Elevation: 233 ft (71 m)

Population (2020)
  - Total: 2,239
  - Density: 2,371.4/sq mi (915.59/km^{2})
- Time zone: UTC-8 (Pacific)
  - Summer (DST): UTC-7 (Pacific)
- ZIP code: 97396
- Area code: 503
- FIPS code: 41-82350
- GNIS feature ID: 2412264
- Website: www.willaminaoregon.gov

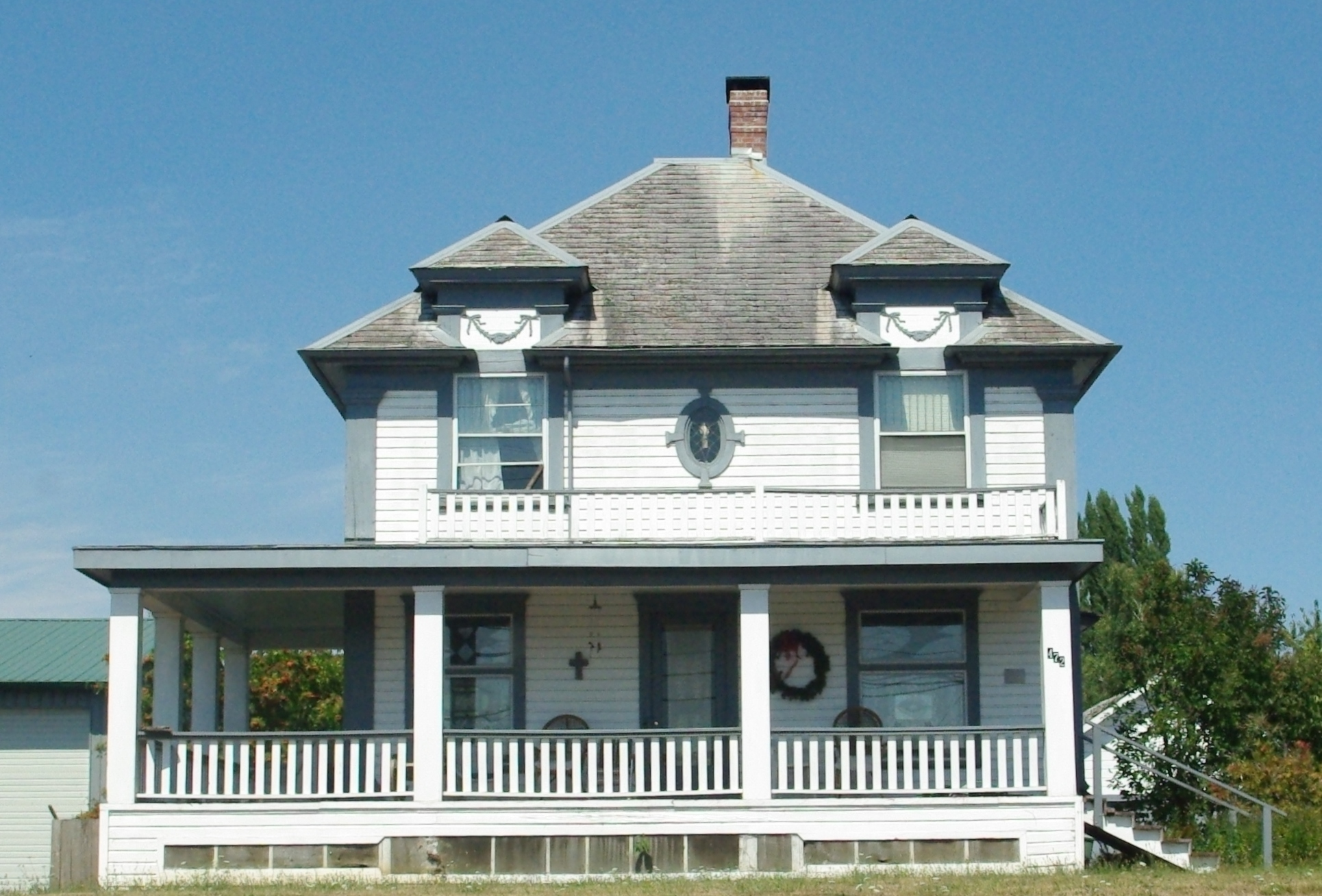
Andrew Kershaw House

Willamina is a city in Polk and Yamhill Counties in the U.S. state of Oregon. The population was 2,239 at the 2020 census.

The Yamhill County portion of Willamina is part of the Portland–Vancouver–Beaverton, Metropolitan Statistical Area, while the Polk County portion is part of the Salem Metropolitan Area.

== History ==
Willamina was named after Willamina Creek, which in turn was named for early settler Willamina Williams shortly after she fell off of her horse and into the creek. Williams was born Willamina Craig in 1817 in Ohio. She married James Maley in 1837 and the couple came to Oregon in 1845 with James' daughter. While looking for land to settle, the family came across a tributary of the South Yamhill River and named it for Mrs. Maley. James Maley died in 1847, and Willamina married Enos Williams in 1848. They settled in what is now Amity.

Willamina post office was established in 1855 on the James Brown land claim, about a mile east of present-day Willamina. The office moved in 1863 about two miles west to the Jeremiah Lamson land claim. In 1866, the office was moved and renamed to present-day Sheridan. In 1878, a new Willamina post office was established; it operated from December 1880 to March 1891 just over the county line in Polk County. A gristmill and sawmill were established in 1878. The townsite was platted in 1879 and Willamina incorporated in 1903. At that time the city had 200 residents.

== Geography ==
According to the United States Census Bureau, the city has a total area of 0.96 square miles (2.49 km^{2}), of which 0.92 square miles (2.38 km^{2}) is land and 0.04 square miles (0.10 km^{2}) is water.

The city lies near the intersection of Oregon Route 18, Oregon Route 18 Business, and Oregon Route 22 next to the South Yamhill River. Willamina is approximately 18 miles southwest of McMinnville. The communities of Shipley and Sheridan are around 2 miles and 5 miles to the northeast, respectively. Valley Junction is located 6 miles to the southwest of Willamina.

== Demographics ==
Historical population
Census	Pop.	Note	%±
1880	68		—
1910	376		—
1920	247		−34.3%
1930	360		45.7%
1940	677		88.1%
1950	1,082		59.8%
1960	960		−11.3%
1970	1,193		24.3%
1980	1,749		46.6%
1990	1,717		−1.8%
2000	1,844		7.4%
2010	2,025		9.8%
2020	2,239		10.6%
U.S. Decennial Census

=== 2020 census ===
As of the 2020 census, Willamina had a population of 2,239. The median age was 35.9 years. 26.4% of residents were under the age of 18 and 13.8% of residents were 65 years of age or older. For every 100 females there were 99.4 males, and for every 100 females age 18 and over there were 95.4 males age 18 and over.

0% of residents lived in urban areas, while 100.0% lived in rural areas.

There were 807 households in Willamina, of which 38.0% had children under the age of 18 living in them. Of all households, 42.4% were married-couple households, 20.1% were households with a male householder and no spouse or partner present, and 25.0% were households with a female householder and no spouse or partner present. About 23.7% of all households were made up of individuals and 10.8% had someone living alone who was 65 years of age or older. There were 852 families living in the city.

There were 852 housing units, of which 5.3% were vacant. Among occupied housing units, 67.3% were owner-occupied and 32.7% were renter-occupied. The homeowner vacancy rate was 1.8% and the rental vacancy rate was 4.6%.

Racial composition as of the 2020 census
Race	Number	Percent
White	1,748	78.1%
Black or African American	5	0.2%
American Indian and Alaska Native	177	7.9%
Asian	12	0.5%
Native Hawaiian and Other Pacific Islander	8	0.4%
Some other race	77	3.4%
Two or more races	212	9.5%
Hispanic or Latino (of any race)	197	8.8%

The ancestry of Willamina was 18.5% German, 12.9% Irish, 10.3% English, 7.4% Scottish, 3.7% Norwegian, 3.4% French, 2.9% Polish, and 2.0% Italian.

The median household income was $49,773, families had $57,656, married-couples had $65,273, and non-families had $33,000. 15.7% of the population were in poverty, with 13% of people under 18, 15.8% of people between 18 and 64, and 20.4% over 65 were in poverty.

=== 2010 census ===
As of the 2010 census, there were 2,025 people, 698 households, and 501 families living in the city. The population density was 2,201.1 inhabitants per square mile (849.8/km^{2}). There were 777 housing units at an average density of 844.6 per square mile (326.1/km^{2}). The racial makeup of the city was 82.1% White, 0.3% African American, 8.8% Native American, 0.1% Asian, 0.4% Pacific Islander, 2.3% from other races, and 5.9% from two or more races. Hispanic or Latino of any race were 6.0% of the population.

There were 698 households, of which 40.1% had children under the age of 18 living with them, 45.7% were married couples living together, 16.0% had a female householder with no husband present, 10.0% had a male householder with no wife present, and 28.2% were non-families. 20.6% of all households were made up of individuals, and 7% had someone living alone who was 65 years of age or older. The average household size was 2.89 and the average family size was 3.26.

The median age in the city was 33.2 years. 28.4% of residents were under the age of 18; 9.8% were between the ages of 18 and 24; 25.4% were between the ages of 25 and 44; 26.6% were between the ages of 45 and 64; and 9.8% were 65 years of age or older. The gender makeup of the city was 50.1% male and 49.9% female.

=== 2000 census ===
As of the census of 2000, there were 1,844 people, 666 households, and 480 families living in the city. The population density was 2,138.0 inhabitants per square mile (825.5/km^{2}). There were 715 housing units at an average density of 829.0 per square mile (320.1/km^{2}). The racial makeup of the city was 84.22% White, 0.16% African American, 9.82% Native American, 0.16% Asian, 0.05% Pacific Islander, 1.84% from other races, and 3.74% from two or more races. Hispanic or Latino of any race were 3.42% of the population.

There were 666 households, of which 39.0% had children under the age of 18 living with them, 52.1% were married couples living together, 13.4% had a female householder with no husband present, and 27.9% were non-families. 22.7% of all households were made up of individuals, and 7.4% had someone living alone who was 65 years of age or older. The average household size was 2.77 and the average family size was 3.19.

In the city, the population was spread out, with 32.4% under the age of 18, 9.1% between the ages of 18 and 24, 28.3% between the ages of 25 and 44, 19.8% between the ages of 45 and 64, and 10.4% who were 65 years of age or older. The median age was 32 years. For every 100 females, there were 99.6 males. For every 100 females age 18 and over, there were 90.8 males.

The median income for a household in the city was $32,326, and the median income for a family was $37,250. Males had a median income of $30,082 versus $22,432 for females. The per capita income for the city was $13,349. About 10.9% of families and 14.3% of the population were below the poverty line, including 17.2% of those under age 18 and 7.7% of those age 65 or over.

== Economy ==
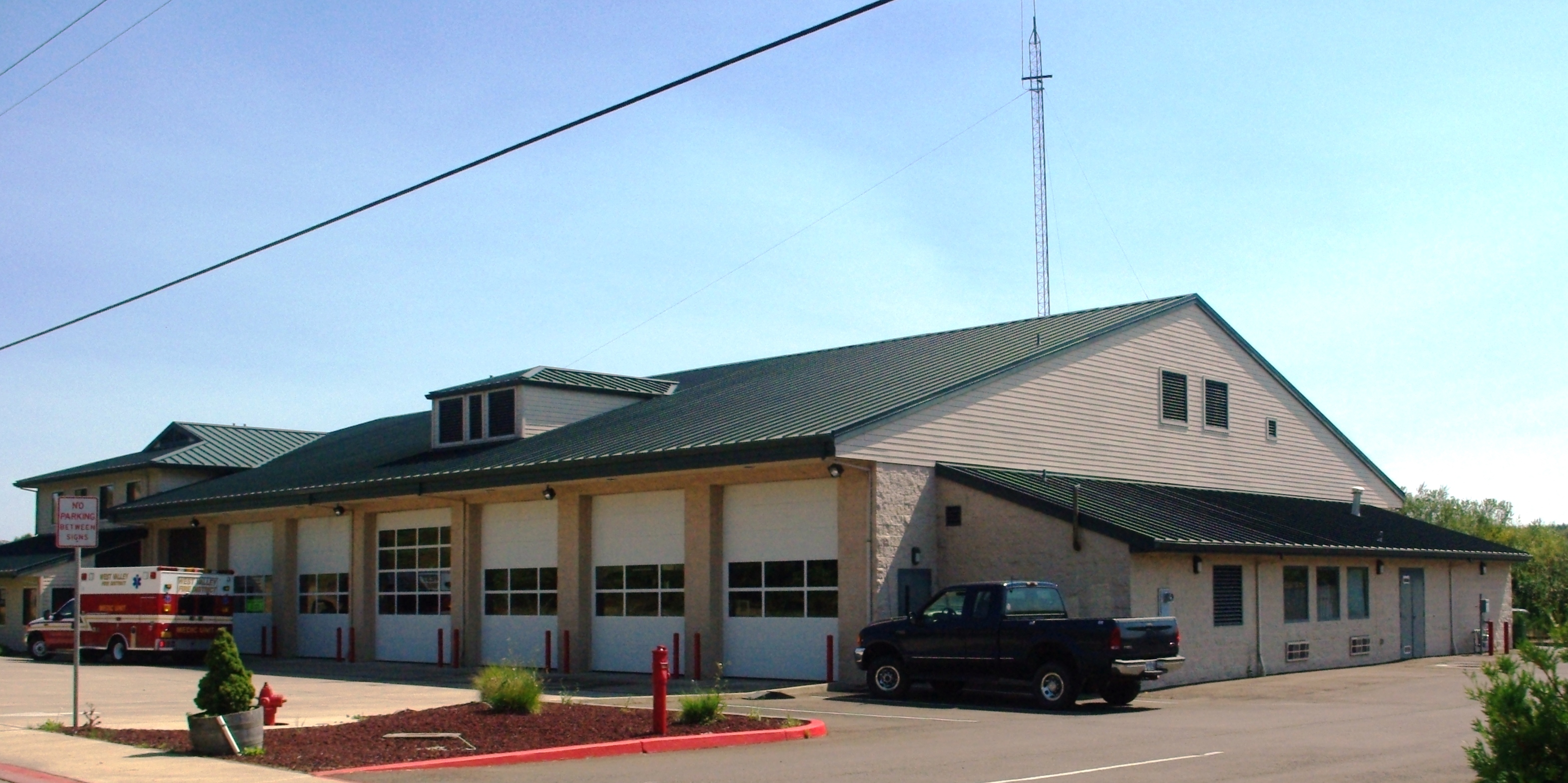
West Valley Fire District station in Willamina

Willamina experienced an economic boom in 1907, when a brick-making company, the Pacific Face Brick Company, moved from Newberg and opened the Willamina Clay Products plant. The Sheridan and Willamina Railroad was built to the city because of the brick plant, which ran for 82 years. Bricks made at Willamina Clay Products were used in the Portland Art Museum, Jackson Tower, and Lloyd Center in Portland, and the Yamhill County Courthouse. The brick plant closed in 1974; the buildings were razed in 1976. The red clay for the company's products came from Newberg, the white clay from Willamina, and the buff clay from Buena Vista.

The other mainstay of the city's economy is the timber industry, and when the Pacific Plywood Corporation opened a plant in 1939, the city's population tripled. Willamina became known as "The Little Town with the Big Payroll". As of 2002, the city's largest employers were Spirit Mountain Casino in nearby Grand Ronde, Hampton Lumber Company, Willamina School District, Maben Trucking, and Eddy Trucking.

== Education ==
Willamina is served by the Willamina School District, including Willamina High School.

== Media ==
Willamina was formerly served by The Sun, Sheridan's weekly newspaper, which ceased publication in 2014. Currently, Willamina is served by the News-Register, a county-wide publication based in McMinnville.

== Infrastructure ==
=== Rail ===
The Sheridan and Willamina Railroad was founded in 1907 and became part of the Southern Pacific Railroad's Willamina Branch in 1913. The independent short line company Willamina and Grand Ronde Railroad (W&GR) extended the line south and west from Willamina to Grand Ronde in 1922; the W&GR changed ownership several times. It was purchased by the Willamette Valley Railway in 1980. Today the lines east and west of Willamina are owned by the Portland and Western Railroad, although the portion of the line from Fort Hill to Grand Ronde is abandoned.

== Sources ==
- Entry for Willamina in the Oregon Blue Book
- "Willamina, Oregon". The Oregon Encyclopedia.
- Official website
- Historic images of Willamina from Salem Public Library
- Willamina Planning Atlas, 1979
- Willamina Brick Factory historic inventory by Stephen Dow Beckham
