= Willamina School District =

School district in Oregon, United States

Location
- Willamina, Yamhill County, Oregon, 97396; United States
- Coordinates: 45.075794°N 123.483624°W

District information
- Grades: K-12
- Superintendent: Mike Gass
- Schools: Willamina Elementary School; Willamina Middle School; Willamina High School
- NCES District ID: 4113350

Students and staff
- Students: 756
- Teachers: 52
- Student–teacher ratio: 19:1

Other information
- Website: willamina.k12.or.us

The Willamina School District (WSD) is a school district in Yamhill County, Oregon which provides K-12 education for the communities of Willamina, Grand Ronde, and Fort Hill, as well as a piece of Sheridan. The district contains an elementary, middle, and high school which all reside on the same campus.

The district covers parts of Yamhill County, and extends into a portion of Polk County and a section of Tillamook County.

== Headquarters ==
The Willamina School District offices are located on-campus, along with the schools within the district. The district office was previously located on Adams street in Willamina, but moved to the K-12 campus in 2014.

== Demographics ==
Oregon Department of Education School District report card statistics indicate that within the district

- 23% of students and 2% of teachers identify as American Indian/Alaska Native
- less than 1% of students and 2% of teachers identify as Asian
- 1% of students and no teachers identify as Black/African American
- 9% of students and 2% of teachers identify as Hispanic/Latino
- 8% of students and no teachers identify as multiracial
- 1% of students and no teachers identify as Native Hawaiian/Pacific Islander, and
- 58% of students and 95% of teachers identify as white.

Additionally, the report card finds that 21% of students in the district have disabilities and over 95% of students qualify for free or reduced price lunch.

The school district spends an average of $11,300 per pupil.

== History ==
Willamina School District officially became recognized in 1907. Since then, the district has undergone major changes, including the consolidation of three separate campuses onto a single Kindergarten through twelfth grade campus.
