= Rail transportation in Oregon =

Rail transportation is an important element of the transportation network in the U.S. state of Oregon. Rail transportation has existed in Oregon in some form since 1855, and the state was a pioneer in development of electric railway systems. While the automobile has displaced many uses of rail in the state (as elsewhere), rail remains a key means of moving passengers and freight, both within the state and to points beyond its borders.

== History ==
The first railway in Oregon was proposed by Byron J. Pengra, Surveyor General of Oregon, along the Oregon Central Military Wagon Road in 1864, but Oregon's first railroad ended up being the Oregon Portage Railroad. Henry Villard's Oregon Railway and Navigation Company established transcontinental rail lines with Northern Pacific in 1880, then with Union Pacific in 1881 (through the latter's Oregon Short Line).

== Twenty-first century network ==
As of 2004, the state of Oregon has over 2,400 mi (3,862 km) (route-miles) of track, and 170 mi (274 km) of railroad right-of-way after peaking in the 1930s at about 4,350 miles (7,001 km) of track. Oregon is served by two Class 1 railroads, which account for over 1,100 miles (1,770 km) of trackage, and over twenty Class 2 and Class 3 operators. Three Amtrak routes serve the state, primarily through the Willamette Valley and south-central Oregon. Rail is a key element of the mass transit system in the city of Portland and surrounding communities. And numerous tourist railways operate in the state.

=== Freight rail ===
Oregon is currently served by two Class 1 railroads, the BNSF Railway and the Union Pacific Railroad (UP). Prior to its acquisition by the UP in 1996, Oregon was also served by the Southern Pacific Transportation Company; the UP continues to operate on tracks acquired from the SP.

==== Union Pacific ====
The UPRR operates several mainlines in the state. The primary north/south UP mainline enters Oregon from California south of Klamath Falls, runs north through Central Oregon up to Chemult, then proceeds northwest via the Willamette Pass to Eugene. From Eugene, it then turns north again up the Willamette Valley, passing through cities including Albany, Salem, Woodburn, Canby, Oregon City, Milwaukie, terminating in Portland. The primary east/west UP mainline starts in Portland and heads east towards Troutdale where it enters the Columbia Gorge. It passes through the gorge on the Oregon side, serving cities such as Hood River, The Dalles, Boardman, and Hermiston. In the Hermiston area, the line branches; with one line heading northeast to Spokane, Washington; the other heading southeast roughly parallel to the old Oregon Trail and modern-day Interstate 84, passing through Pendleton, La Grande, Baker City, and Ontario before entering Idaho.

In addition to the mainlines, the UPRR also operates several branch lines in the state, serving the terminal district of Portland, the city of Umatilla, and the community of Pilot Rock.

==== BNSF ====
The BNSF operates one significant mainline in the state, serving Central Oregon. The BNSF line enters the state southeast of Klamath Falls, joining the UPRR mainline there. The two lines share trackage between Klamath Falls and Chemult until the UPRR branches off towards Eugene; the BNSF continues in a northeasterly direction through central Oregon, providing service to Bend, Redmond and Madras. The line continues north of Madras along the Deschutes River until it interchanges with the UPRR mainline east of The Dalles; it then crosses the Columbia River and intersects with the BNSF mainline on the Washington side.

The BNSF also operates a mainline in the Portland area which is a key rail link despite having only approximately ten miles of trackage in Oregon; this link crosses the Columbia River into Vancouver, connecting with the BNSF line heading north to Seattle, as well as the BNSF line heading east along the Washington side of the Columbia Gorge, towards the Tri-Cities and Spokane. (Eastbound Amtrak service from Portland crosses into Vancouver and uses the BNSF tracks, not the UPRR tracks in Oregon.)

==== Portland Terminal Railroad ====
The Portland Terminal Railroad (PTRC) is a joint terminal railroad of the UPRR and the BNSF, which operates several key rail lines, as well as the Guild's Lake Yard, within the city of Portland. The PTRR facilitates interchange between the two Class 1 railroads; each railways' trains are considered "home" while on PTRC trackage. It was called the Northern Pacific Terminal Company until changing its name to the Portland Terminal Railroad Company in 1965, at which time it was jointly owned by the Northern Pacific, Union Pacific and Southern Pacific railroads.

==== Short lines ====
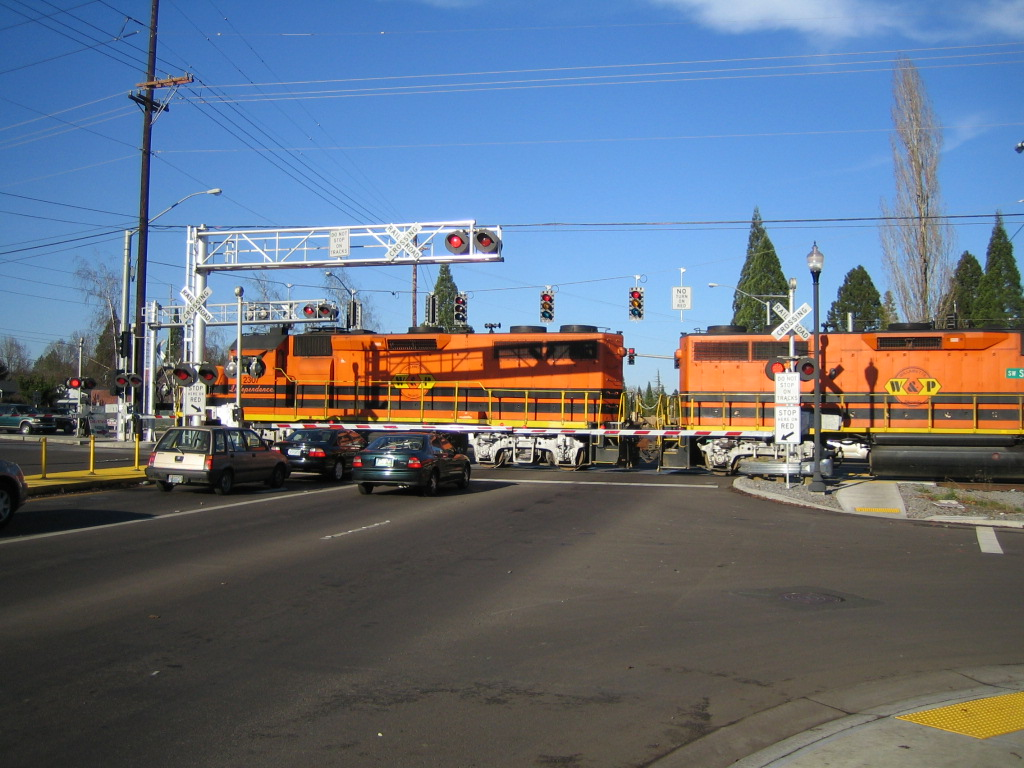
A Portland and Western train in Beaverton

In addition to the two Class 1 carriers, there are numerous short line operators in the state of Oregon, with miles of trackage. Many places in Oregon, such as Washington, Yamhill, Polk, and Benton counties in the Willamette Valley; numerous communities in the Cascade foothills, the Oregon Coast, all of Southwestern Oregon, and the Wallowa Mountains, are not reachable via the Class 1 mainlines.

Short line operators include:

- Albany and Eastern Railroad. This railway provides service to Albany, Lebanon, and Sweet Home.
- Central Oregon and Pacific Railroad (CORP), a subsidiary of Genesee & Wyoming, provides service to Southwestern Oregon and northwestern California. Main line is former SP line over Siskiyou Pass between Eugene and Weed, California; cities served include Eugene, Cottage Grove, Roseburg, Grants Pass, Medford, and Ashland. Until September 2007, CORP operated a second line from Eugene to Coquille via Florence, Reedsport, and Coos Bay. This latter line closed at that time, but was sold in 2009 to the Port of Coos Bay, which reopened it in 2011–2013 as Coos Bay Rail Link.
- City of Prineville Railway (COP). Connects the BNSF mainline in Redmond with the city of Prineville.
- Hampton Railway. Serves the Hampton lumber mill in Fort Hill, Oregon; interchanges with the PNWR in Willamina.
- Idaho Northern and Pacific Railroad (INPR). Runs from the UPRR mainline in LaGrande to Elgin.
- Goose Lake Railway (GOOS). GOOS operates a 55-mile line from Lakeview, OR to Alturas, CA for the Lake County and 60 miles of line from Alturas, CA to Perez, CA for Union Pacific Railroad.
- Klamath Northern Railway (KNOR). Operates a 10.6 miles (17.1 km) branch line in Central Oregon, connecting Gilchrist to the UP mainline.
- Mount Hood Railroad (MH). Connects Hood River with Parkdale. Primarily an excursion railway, but does handle some freight.
- Oregon Pacific Railroad. Operates two branch lines off the UPRR mainline, one serving the Sellwood neighborhood of Portland; the other connecting Liberal to the mainline in Canby.
- Palouse River and Coulee City Railroad (PCC). Operates two branch lines in the state, one from Arlington to Shutler; the other from Walla Walla, Washington to Milton-Freewater and Weston.
- Peninsula Terminal Company (PTRR). Serves terminal operations in north Portland.
- Port of Tillamook Bay Railroad (POTB). Operated between Tillamook and the Portland metropolitan area, interchanging with the PNWR in Washington County, until a December 2007 storm caused extensive damage to its main line that has not been repaired.
- Portland and Western Railroad (PNWR)/Willamette and Pacific Railroad (WPRR). Provides service to much of northwestern Oregon, including the lower Columbia River (Astoria, Rainier, St. Helens), Portland's western suburbs (Beaverton, Hillsboro, Forest Grove, Tigard, Lake Oswego, Tualatin, Sherwood, and Wilsonville), much of the Willamette Valley (Newberg, McMinnville, Willamina, Salem, Albany, Eugene, Corvallis), and the coastal city of Toledo.
- Rogue Valley Terminal Railroad Corporation (RVT). Provides common carrier switching service at the White City Industrial Park.
- Wallowa Union Railroad Authority. Runs between the INPR in Elgin, and Enterprise.
- Willamette Valley Railway. Runs from the UPRR mainline in Woodburn to Stayton, serving the cities of Mt. Angel and Silverton.
- Wyoming and Colorado Railroad. Runs from the UPRR mainline in Ontario to Vale and Celatom.

=== Passenger service ===
Rail is also used in the state to provide both long-haul passenger service, as well as commuter and intra-urban transit, and excursion trains.

==== Amtrak ====
Long-haul passenger service is provided by Amtrak, which operates in Oregon on the north-south Union Pacific mainline south of Portland, and on BNSF tracks into Washington to the north and east. Three Amtrak routes provide service to Oregon:

- The Coast Starlight, running from Seattle, Washington to Los Angeles, California provides service to Portland, Salem, Albany, Eugene, Chemult, and Klamath Falls.
- The Amtrak Cascades, running from Vancouver, British Columbia to Eugene, serves Portland, Oregon City, Salem, Albany, and Eugene.
- The Empire Builder, running from Portland to Chicago, Illinois, provides service to Portland. Immediately after departing Portland, the train crosses into Washington, and does not serve any other Oregon community.

In Portland, the Amtrak depot is Union Station, located in downtown. Active Amtrak depots are also located in Oregon City, Salem, Albany, Eugene, Chemult, and Klamath Falls.

==== Transit and commuter rail ====
Rail transit is a key part of the local and regional transportation network in Portland and its surrounding communities. Two electrically powered rail systems and one diesel-powered commuter rail system presently provide transit service in the Portland metropolitan area.

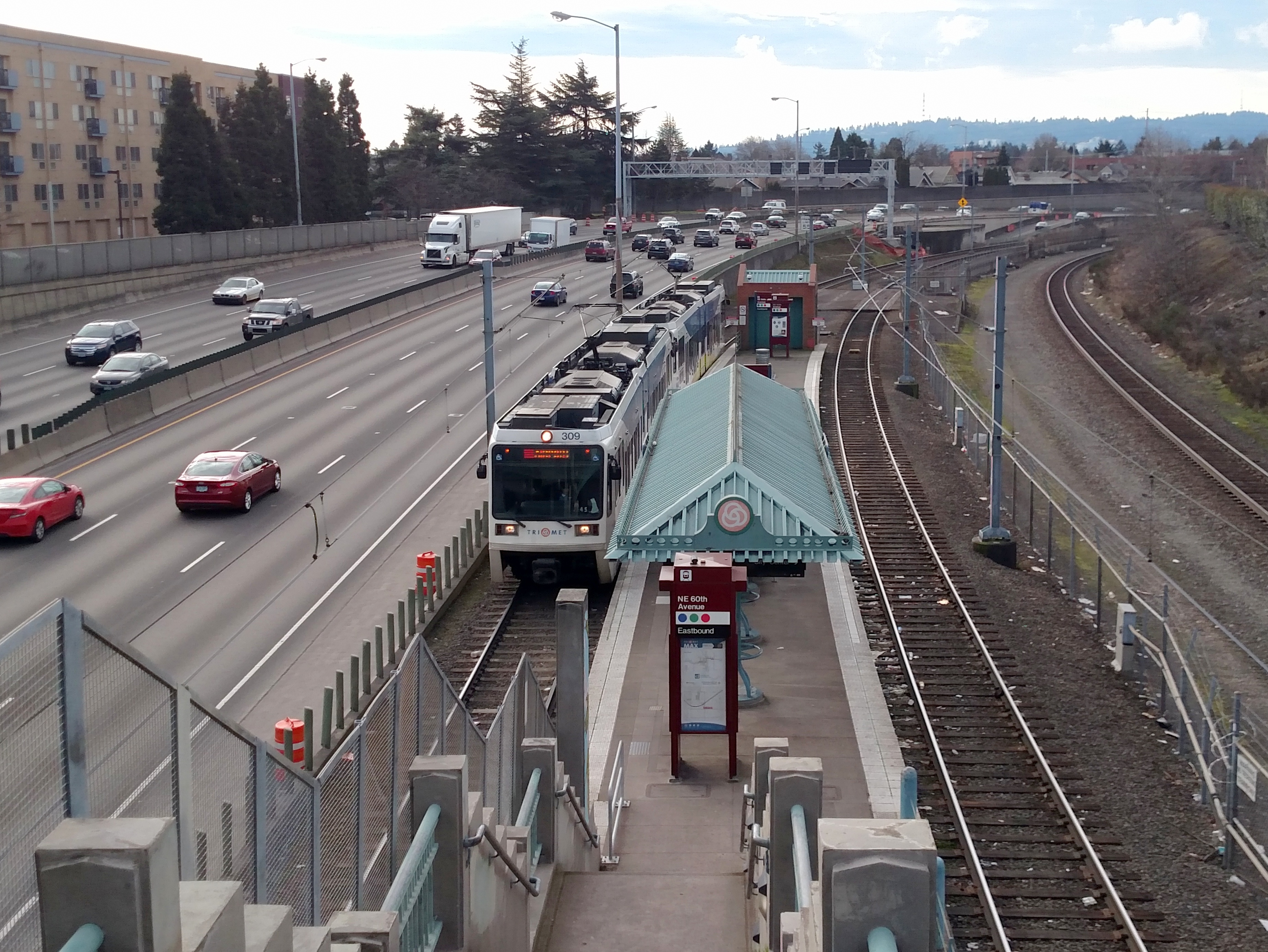
MAX light rail along the Banfield Freeway (I-84)

- The MAX Light Rail system, a 52.4-mile (84.3 km) light rail system operated by TriMet (the transit authority for the Portland area), presently serves the cities of Portland, Beaverton, Hillsboro, and Gresham on four separate lines. The first line opened in 1986, running for 15 miles (24 km) east from downtown Portland to Gresham. A second line opened in 1998, extending the system west from downtown to Beaverton and Hillsboro, and this was operated as an extension of the eastside line, the combined route being designated the Blue Line in 2000–2001. The Red Line opened in 2001, providing service to Portland International Airport; the Yellow Line opened in 2004, with service to north Portland; and the Green Line opened in 2009, with service to Clackamas. In 2015, service was extended to Milwaukie, with the opening of the Orange Line. Planning is under way for an extension of MAX through Southwest Portland and Tigard to Bridgeport Village, in northern Tualatin, known for now as the Southwest Corridor Project.

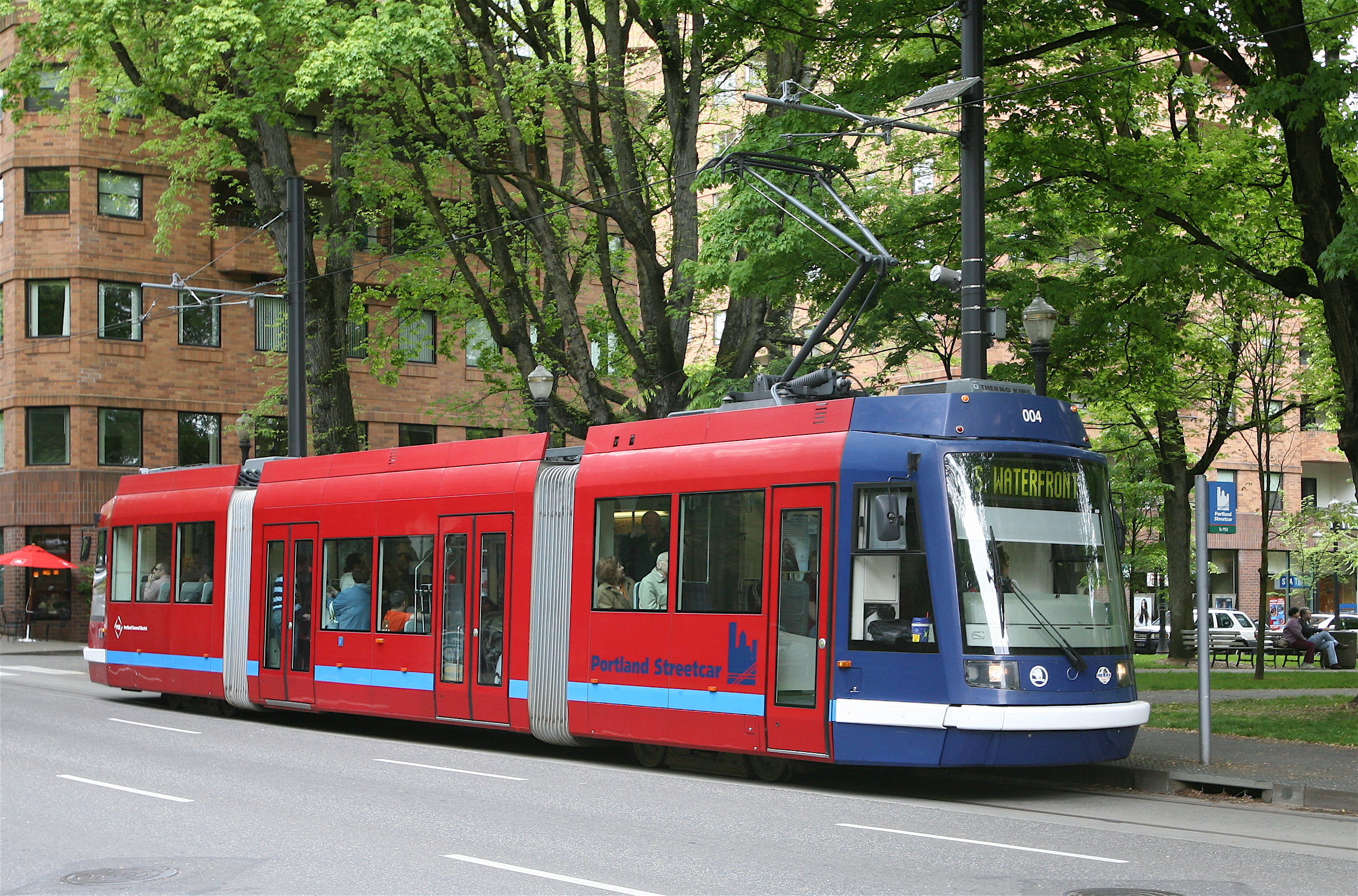
Portland Streetcar

- The Portland Streetcar is an electrically powered streetcar (or tram) system with two lines, which serves downtown Portland and adjacent areas. The first line, opened in 2001 and later designated the NS Line, runs between the Northwest district and the South Waterfront district, also providing service to the Pearl District and Portland State University (PSU). Unlike MAX, which primarily runs in its own right-of-way, the streetcar shares most of its right-of-way with vehicular traffic. A second line, the CL Line, was opened in 2012, serving the Central Eastside District and the Lloyd District before crossing the Broadway Bridge to join the NS Line and follow its downtown section south as far as PSU. Although CL was short for Central Loop, the line was not a complete loop until 2015, when the opening of the Tilikum Crossing bridge across the Willamette River (as part of the MAX Orange Line project) allowed its two southern ends to be connected. The CL line was extended across the new bridge and renamed Loop Service, with the clockwise service being the A Loop and the counterclockwise service being the B Loop. The streetcar system interchanges with both the MAX system and the Portland Aerial Tram, an aerial cableway that opened to the public in 2007. The NS Line has been and extended three times since its 2001 opening and is currently 4 miles (6.4 km) end-to-end. The CL line extended the system by 3.3 miles (5.3 km) in 2012, and its 2015 extension added another 0.55 miles (0.9 km) of new route to the streetcar system.

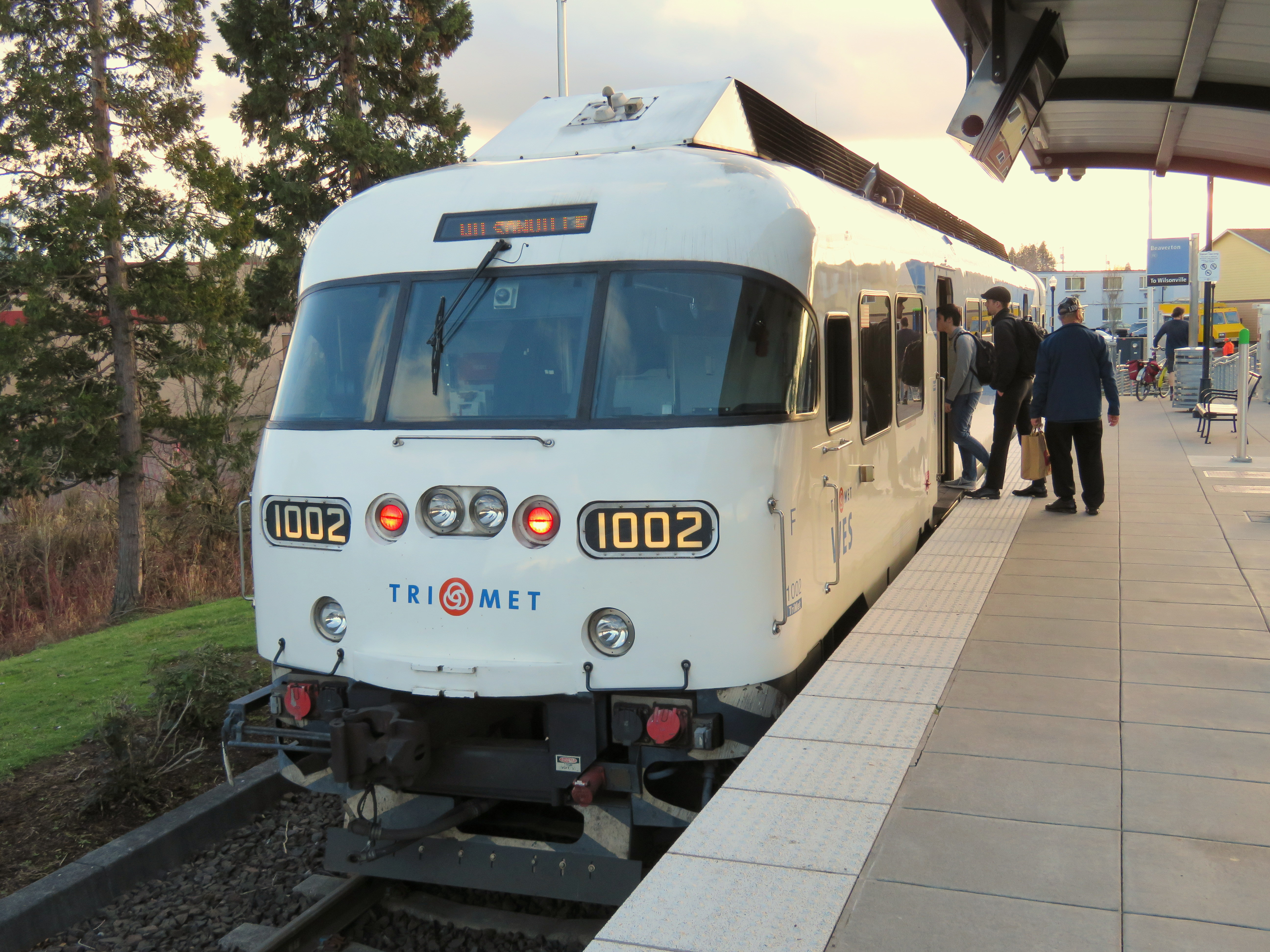
WES commuter rail car

- The Westside Express Service is a 14.7-mile (23.7 km) diesel-powered commuter rail service which began operating in early 2009 and runs between the cities of Beaverton and Wilsonville on previously existing freight trackage. It has three intermediate stops, two of which serve the cities of Tigard and Tualatin, and connects with MAX at the Beaverton Transit Center. The vehicles are operated by Portland and Western Railroad under contract with TriMet, but the transit agency owns the DMU-type rail cars and maintenance facility (and employs the vehicle maintenance personnel), and most funding for operations comes from TriMet.

==== Tourist railways ====
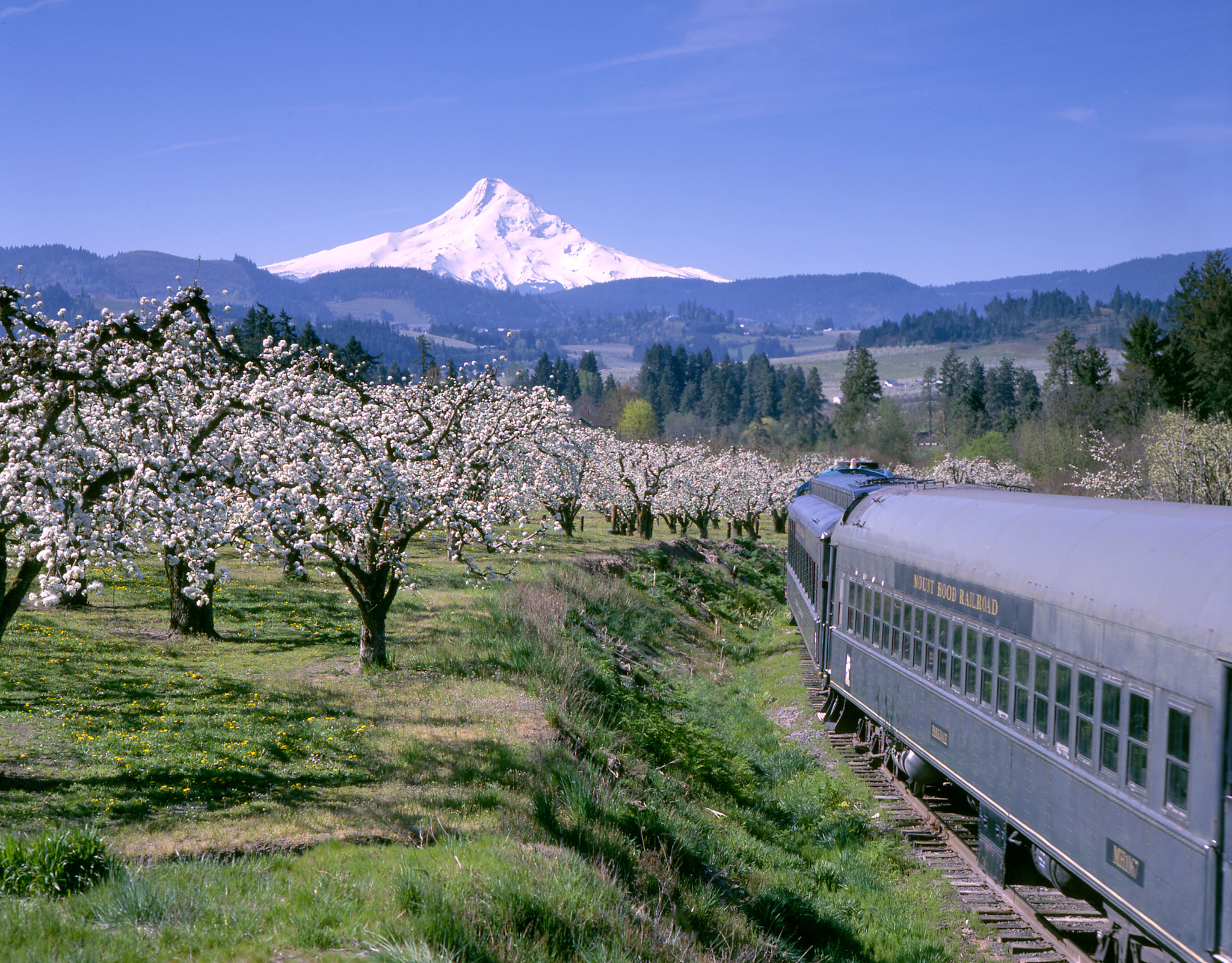
The Mount Hood Railroad

Numerous tourist and excursion, and heritage railways operate in the state of Oregon. Among them are:

- The Astoria Riverfront Trolley is a heritage streetcar service using former Burlington Northern tracks in Astoria, since 1999.
- The Mount Hood Railroad provides excursion trains between the cities of Hood River and Parkdale. The railroad also provides limited freight service.
- The Oregon Coast Scenic Railroad is a heritage railroad providing steam and diesel powered excursions along the Oregon coast at Garibaldi.
- The Sumpter Valley Railway, a narrow-gauge steam-powered heritage railway between the Eastern Oregon towns of Sumpter and McEwen.
- The Washington Park and Zoo Railway is a narrow-gauge railroad in Portland's Washington Park which takes passengers around the grounds of the Oregon Zoo. Until 2013, the line also included a longer section running through the forested park to a stop near the International Rose Test Garden and Portland Japanese Garden, but that section was not reopened following a 2013–2014 suspension for renovation, and is now planned to remain closed permanently. A zoo admission is required to ride the train.
- The Willamette Shore Trolley is a heritage streetcar operating between Portland and Lake Oswego, since 1990.

== See also ==
- Oregon Rail Heritage Foundation
- Oregon Rail Heritage Center
- Transportation in Portland, Oregon
