= Rogue River (South Yamhill River tributary) =

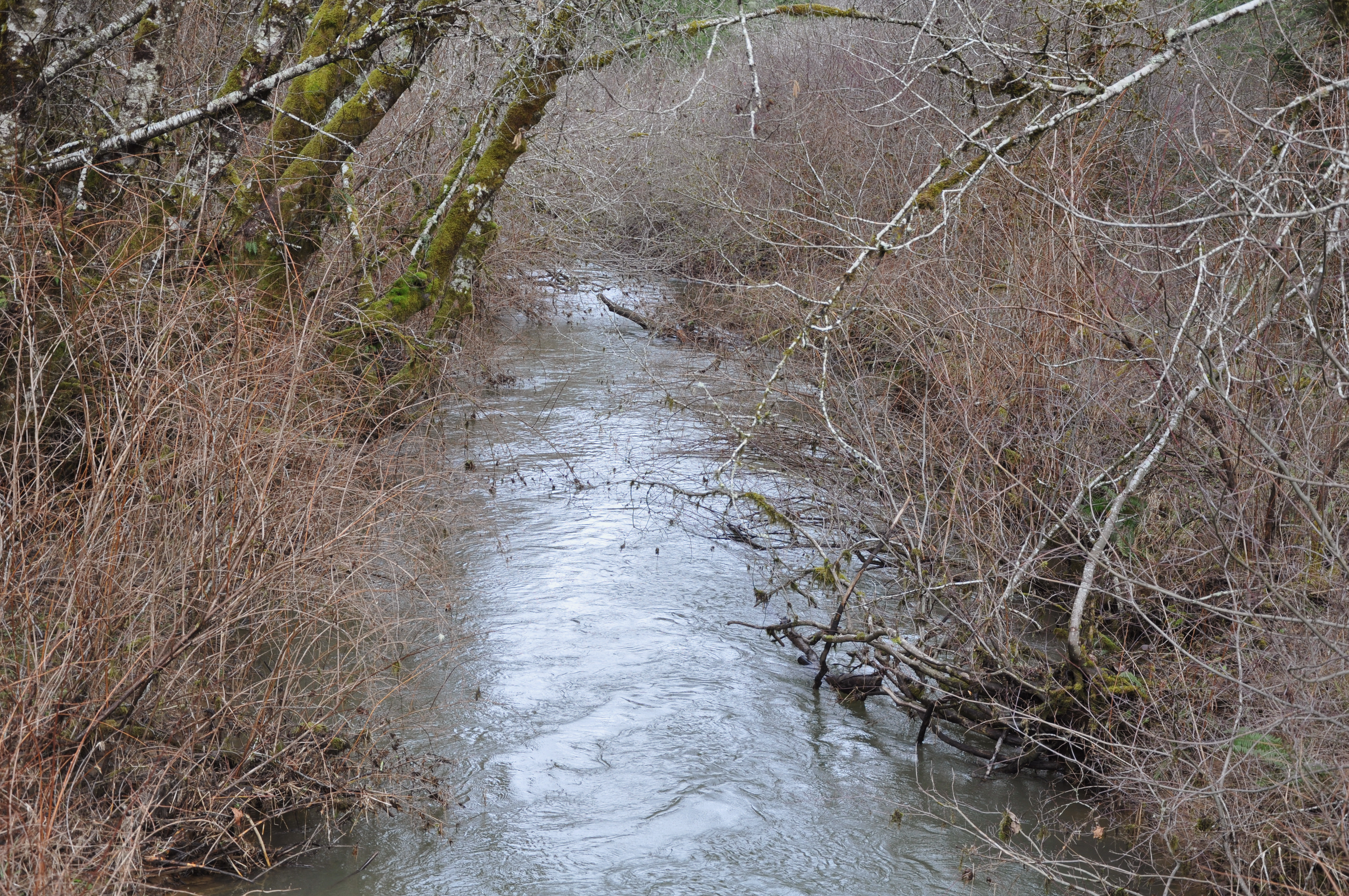
- Downstream from Oregon Route 18 near Grande Ronde

- Location of the mouth of Rogue River (South Yamhill River) in Oregon
- Etymology: Native Americans forced to move from near the Rogue River in Southern Oregon to the Grand Ronde Indian Reservation

Location
- Country: United States
- State: Oregon
- County: Polk

Physical characteristics
- Source: Saddleback Mountain
  - location: Polk County, Oregon
  - coordinates: 45°01′07″N 123°42′10″W
  - elevation: 1,945 ft (593 m)
- Mouth: South Yamhill River
  - location: Grande Ronde, Polk County, Oregon
  - coordinates: 45°03′50″N 123°36′45″W
  - elevation: 322 ft (98 m)
- Length: 6 mi (9.7 km)

The Rogue River is a tributary of the South Yamhill River in Polk County, Oregon, United States. It enters the South Yamhill about 1,000 feet (300 m) north of Grand Ronde. It is sometimes referred to as Rogue Creek.

It was named for the Rogue River Indians who lived along its banks after they were forced to move from Southern Oregon to the nearby Grand Ronde Indian Reservation.

Its headwaters are on the northeast face of Saddleback Mountain, elevation 3,004 feet (916 m).

== See also ==
- List of rivers of Oregon
