= Valley Junction, Oregon =

Unincorporated community in the state of Oregon, United States

Coordinates: 45°03′43″N 123°34′19″W

Valley Junction is an unincorporated community in Polk County, Oregon, United States. It is located at the junction of Oregon Route 18 and Oregon Route 22, on the South Yamhill River east of Grand Ronde. A now-abandoned section of the Willamina and Grand Ronde Railway short line passed through Valley Junction. The Fort Yamhill State Heritage Area and Spirit Mountain Casino are nearby.

== See also ==
- Willamette Valley Railway#History
