= Happy Dragon Chinese Restaurant =

Restaurant in Portland, Oregon, U.S.

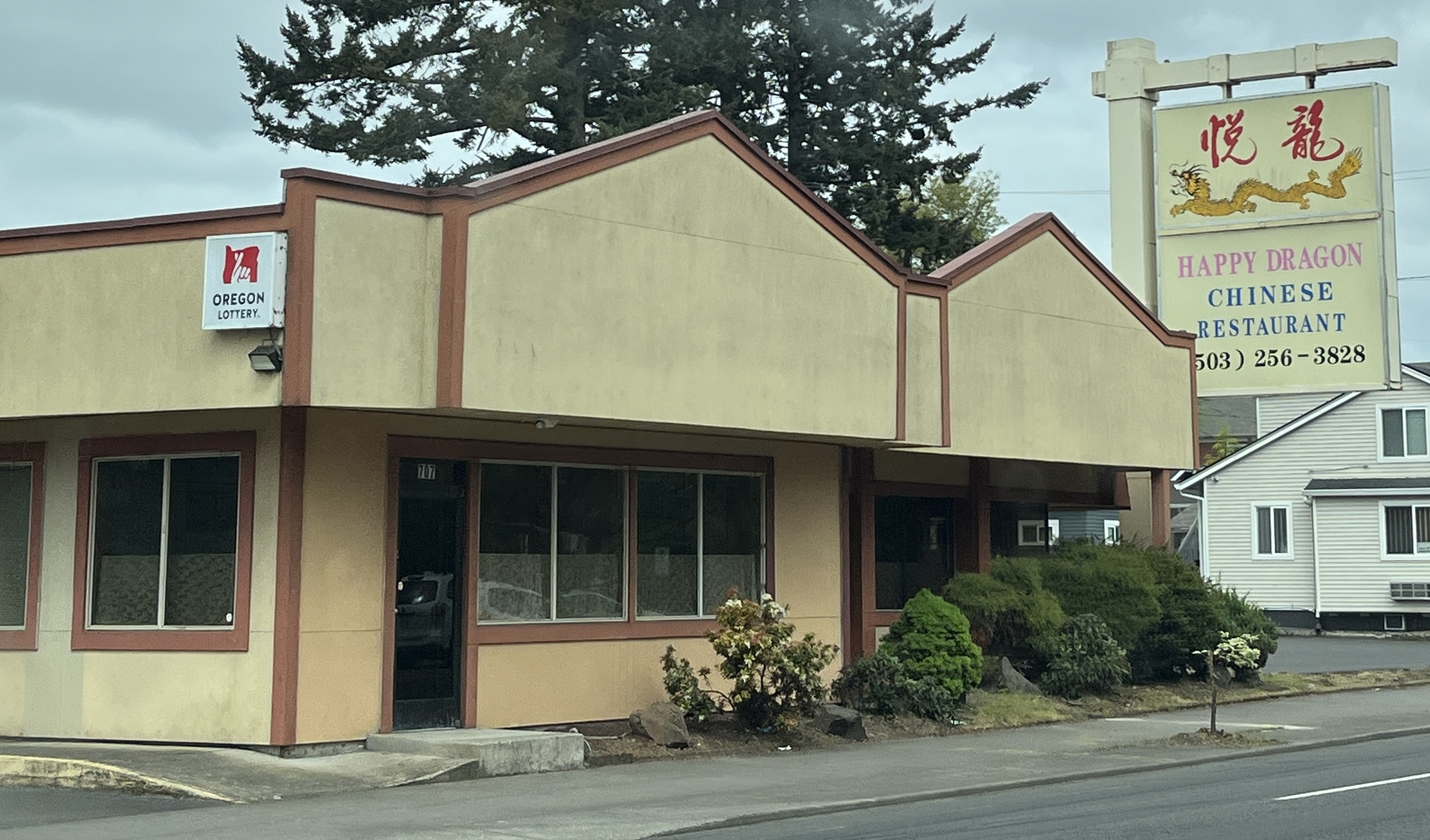
- The restaurant's exterior in 2025
- Interactive map of Happy Dragon Chinese Restaurant

Restaurant information
- Food type: Cantonese; Chinese
- Location: 707 Northeast 82nd Avenue, Portland, Multnomah, Oregon, 97220, United States
- Coordinates: 45.5277°N 122.5794°W

Happy Dragon Chinese Restaurant is a family-operated Chinese restaurant in Portland, Oregon, United States. The business was established in Independence in 2013 and relocated to 82nd Avenue in the northeast Portland part of the Montavilla neighborhood in 2018.

Happy Dragon also operated an outpost at Spirit Mountain Casino, a Native American casino operated by the Confederated Tribes of the Grand Ronde Community of Oregon in Grand Ronde, from 2022 to 2024.

== Description ==
Happy Dragon Chinese Restaurant operates in the northeast Portland part of the Montavilla neighborhood. Previously, the business operated in a wood-paneled space with gold-painted dragon wallpaper on Polk Street in Independence. The Portland restaurant operates on 82nd Avenue and has a banquet hall with Lazy Susans. The menu has included Cantonese / Chinese cuisine such as lo mein, Peking duck, and sweet-and-sour chicken. The restaurant has also served Chinese pancakes, chicken feet, jellyfish, king crab, ginger-scallion lobster, and other seafood, as well as soy sauce chicken, vegetable fried rice, and xiaolongbao (soup dumplings).

== History ==
Happy Dragon opened in Independence in 2013. Linan (or Li Nan) Feng, who previously worked at Ocean City Seafood Restaurant and Wong's King in Portland, is a chef and owner.

In 2018, the business announced plans to relocate to Portland. Happy Dragon opened in Portland in October 2018, and Lucky Dragon Restaurant began operating in the Independence space that had previously housed Happy Dragon on April 6, 2019.

During the COVID-19 pandemic, Happy Dragon experienced declined sales because of indoor dining restrictions as well as racial discrimination. In 2021, the restaurant participated in the Around the World in 82 Dishes, a food competition organized by the 82nd Avenue Business District for businesses along 82nd Avenue.

An outpost of Happy Dragon operated at Spirit Mountain Casino from June 2022 to April 7, 2024.

== Reception ==
In Eater Portland's 2024 list of "stellar" restaurants on the "culinarily blessed" 82nd Avenue, Alli Fodor and Nathan Williams wrote, "By outside appearances, Happy Dragon looks like a longstanding institution on 82nd, the sort of mid-century Chinese restaurant that might just be coasting on a decades-old reputation." They said the business "quickly [earned] enthusiastic word of mouth praise for its Cantonese fare" following the move to Portland and called the Peking duck "the best in town". Writers also included the business in the website's 2024 overview of Portland's best Chinese food. Eater Portland's Brooke Jackson-Glidden has recommended Happy Dragon for large groups.

== See also ==
- History of Chinese Americans in Portland, Oregon
- List of Chinese restaurants
