= North Yamhill River =

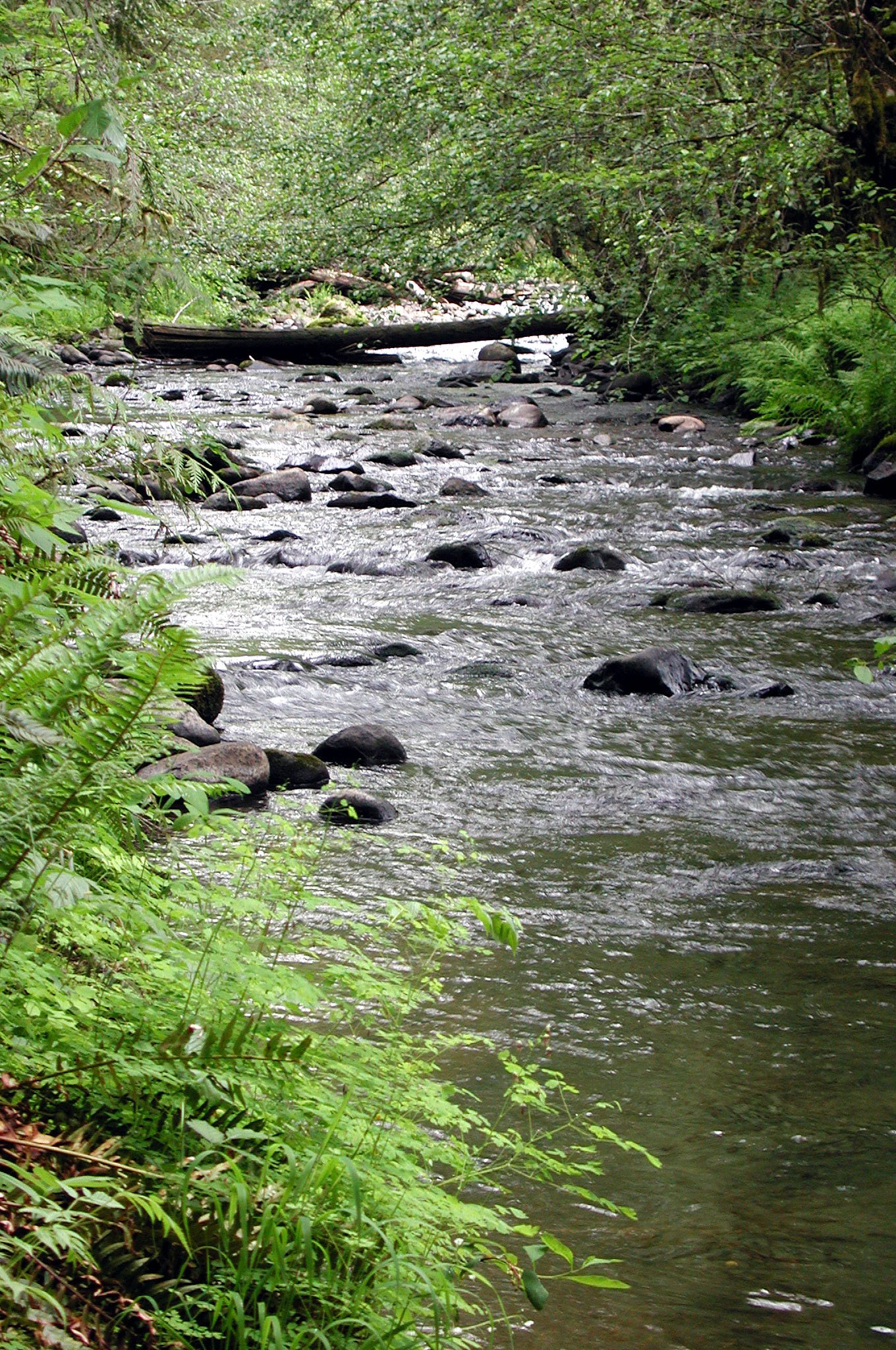
- North Yamhill River near Flying M Airport

- Location of the mouth of North Yamhill River in Oregon
- Etymology: Uncertain but probably after a local Kalapuya tribe

Location
- Country: United States
- State: Oregon
- County: Yamhill

Physical characteristics
- Source: Northern Oregon Coast Range
  - location: Siuslaw National Forest, in western Yamhill County, Oregon
  - coordinates: 45°23′51″N 123°25′23″W
  - elevation: 2,467 ft (752 m)
- Mouth: Yamhill River
  - location: between McMinnville and Dayton, Yamhill County, Oregon
  - coordinates: 45°13′33″N 123°08′42″W
  - elevation: 75 ft (23 m)
- Length: 31 mi (50 km)
- Basin size: 177 sq mi (460 km^{2})

The North Yamhill River is a 31-mile (50 km) tributary of the Yamhill River in the U.S. state of Oregon. It drains an area of the Northern Oregon Coast Range, as well as part of the Willamette Valley west of the Willamette River.

Rising in a remote area in the mountains of northwestern Yamhill County, the river flows generally east, then southeast, then south past the city of Yamhill. It joins the South Yamhill River about 2 miles (3.2 km) east of McMinnville to form the Yamhill River.

== Course ==
The river begins at an elevation of 2,467 feet (752 m) above sea level and falls 2,392 feet (729 m) between source and mouth to an elevation of 75 feet (23 m). It rises northeast of Trask Mountain, a 3,412-foot (1,040 m) peak at 45°22′17″N 123°27′23″W, in the Northern Oregon Coast Range. The source, at about river mile (RM) 31 or river kilometer (RK) 50, lies near the border between Tillamook County and Yamhill County northwest of the city of Yamhill.

Flowing south and then southeast for its first 1 mile (1.6 km), the river receives Perkins Creek from the right. Heading east, it receives Maroney Creek from the right before reaching the Flying M Ranch and Flying M Airport at about RM 26 (RK 42), where it receives Hanna Creek from the left and Petch Creek from the right. Continuing east, the stream receives Fairchild Creek from the left, Haskins Creek from the right, and Cedar Creek from the left before reaching Pike at RM 20 (RK 32). Shortly thereafter, the river turns southeast, and Turner Creek enters from the left.

About 1 mile (1.6 km) below Pike, the valley widens, and the river begins to meander and to turn more sharply south, receiving Hutchcroft Creek from the right and Salt Creek from the left near RM 16 (RK 26). Turning southeast again, the river flows by the city of Yamhill, which lies to its left, and receives Rowland Creek and Yamhill Creek, both from the left. From Yamhill to the mouth, the North Yamhill River flows generally south and roughly parallel to Oregon Route 47, which lies to its left. Soon the river reaches Alecs Butte, a 384-foot (117 m) summit at 45°19′13″N 123°11′04″W, on the left at about RM 13 (RK 21).

About 1 mile (1.6 km) later, the stream enters Carlton Lake Wildlife Refuge and flows through it, reaching the city of Carlton, on the left at RM 10 (RK 16). Slightly downstream of RM 4.0 (RK 6.4), Panther Creek enters from the right. The river passes under Oregon Route 99W at about RM 1.0 (RK 1.6) before joining the South Yamhill River to form the Yamhill River, an 11-mile (18 km) tributary of the Willamette River.

== See also ==
- List of rivers of Oregon
