= Palmer Creek (Yamhill River tributary) =

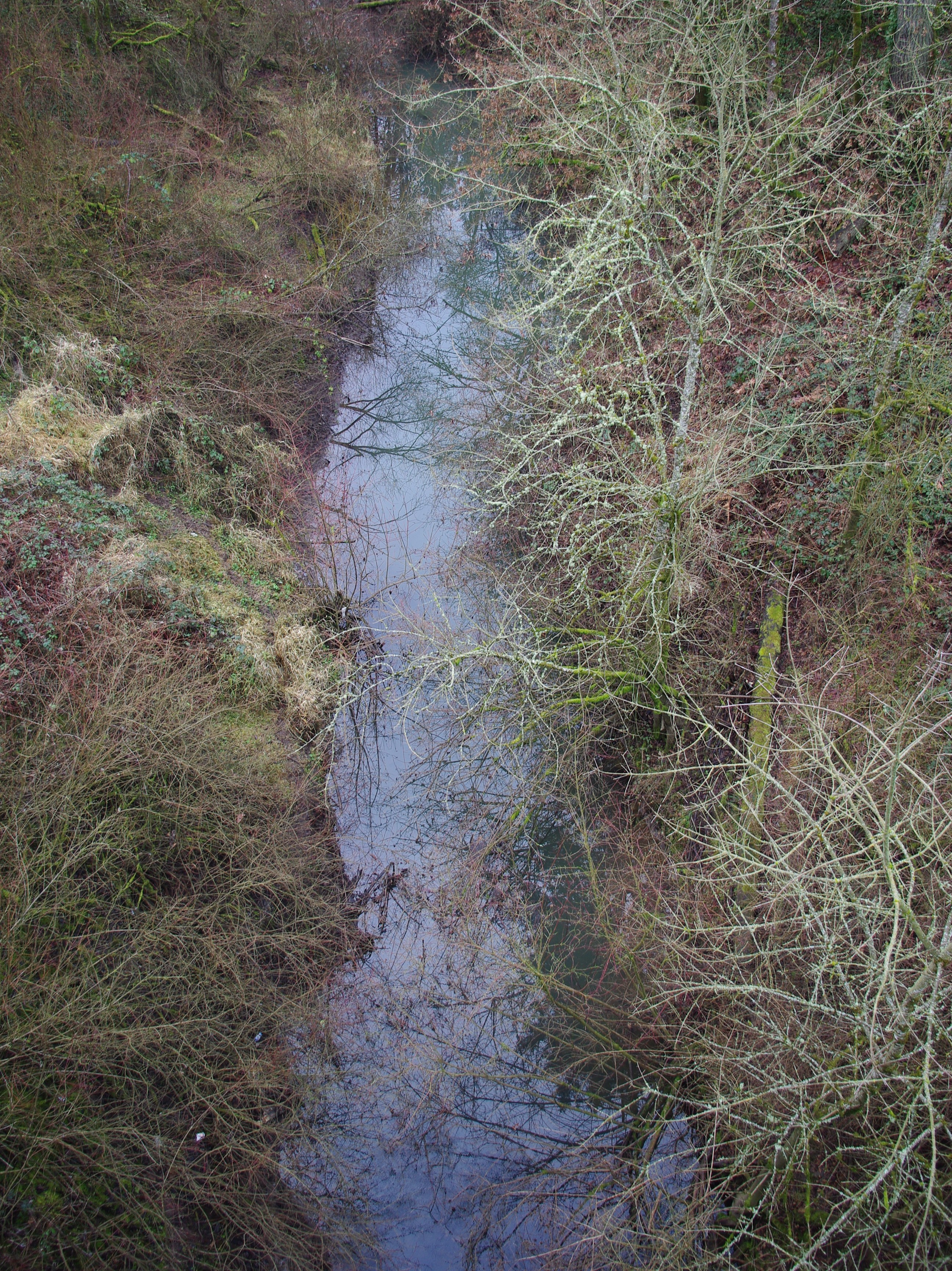
- Palmer Creek from Oregon Route 221 at Dayton

- Location of the mouth of Palmer Creek in Oregon

Location
- Country: United States
- State: Oregon
- Region: Willamette Valley
- County: Polk, Yamhill
- City: Dayton

Physical characteristics
- Source: Eola Hills
  - location: Polk County
  - coordinates: 45°04′04″N 123°08′35″W
  - elevation: 1,037 ft (316 m)
- Mouth: Yamhill River
  - location: Dayton, Yamhill County
  - coordinates: 45°13′17″N 123°04′16″W
  - elevation: 105 ft (32 m)

Palmer Creek is a tributary of the Yamhill River in northwestern Oregon in the United States. Arising in Polk County it flows north, crossing almost immediately into Yamhill County. It continues generally north, entering the larger stream at Dayton, 5 miles (8 km) upstream of the Yamhill's confluence with the Willamette River.

Its two named tributaries from source to mouth are Holdridge Creek and West Fork Palmer Creek. The main stem passes under Oregon Route 221 in Dayton.

Palmer Creek was named after pioneer Joel Palmer; before, it was known as Smith Creek. It flows through private agricultural lands and is highly denuded by residual pesticides. Palmer Creek flows year-round because water from the Willamette River is diverted into the creek so it can be used for irrigation.

== Fish ==
Coastal cutthroat trout move into Palmer Creek from the Yamhill River during the autumn and winter, and a small number of them remain through summertime. Other fish that inhabit the Yamhill River and the lower section of Palmer Creek are carp, goldfish, largescale sucker, chiselmouth, redside shiner, peamouth chub, northern squawfish, sculpin, dace and Pacific lamprey.

== See also ==
- List of rivers of Oregon
