= Willamette Valley Railway =

Short-line railroad in western Oregon

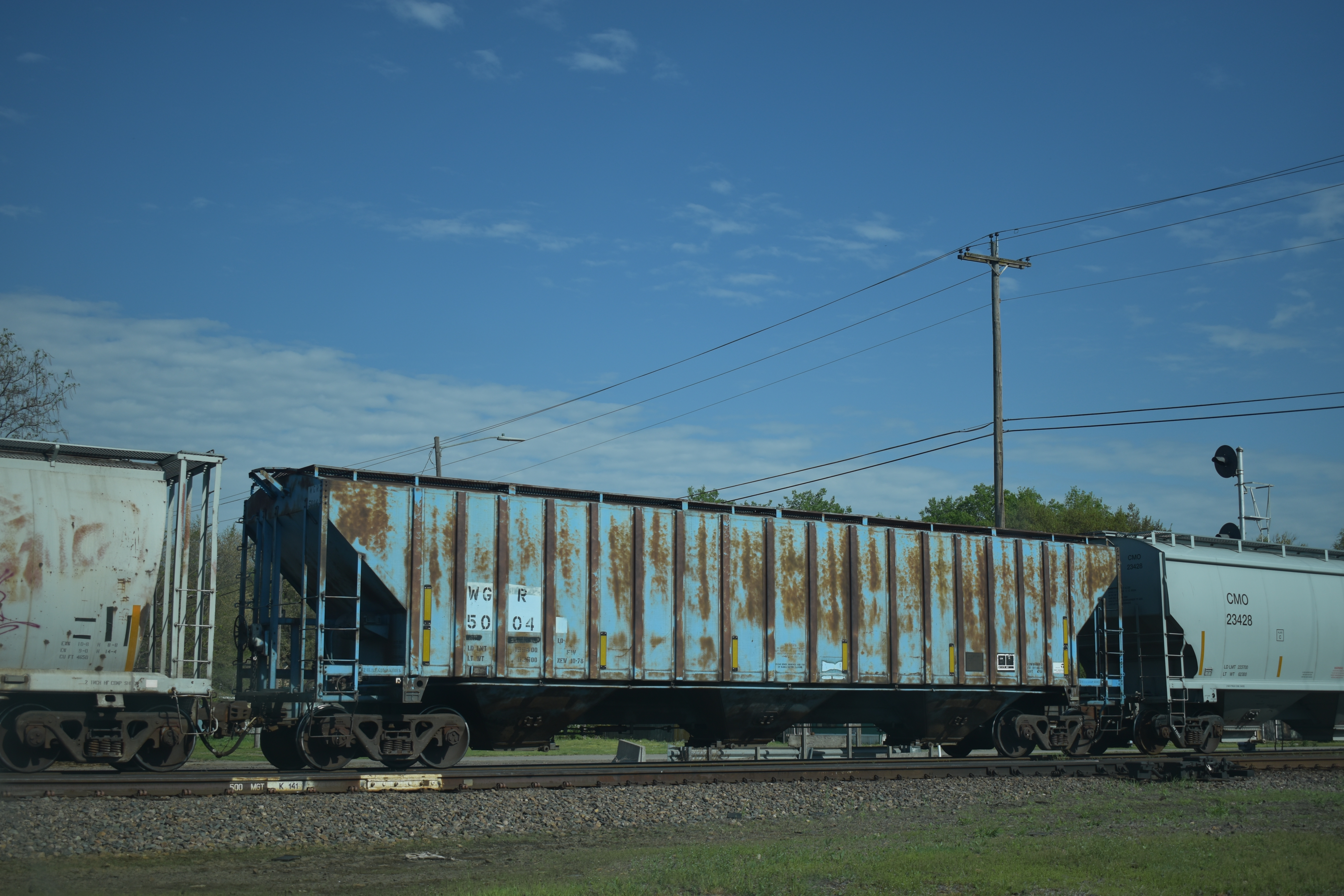
- Willamette Valley Railway hopper car on a train in Topeka, Kansas, April 25, 2019.

Overview
- Headquarters: Independence, Oregon
- Reporting mark: WVR, WGR
- Locale: Northwestern Oregon
- Dates of operation: 1993–

Technical
- Track gauge: 4 ft 8 1/2 in (1,435 mm) standard gauge

The Willamette Valley Railway (reporting marks WVR, WGR) is a short-line railroad that operates in the Willamette Valley of Oregon. It leased a line from Woodburn to Stayton from the Southern Pacific Transportation Company in February 1993, as well as a branch from Geer west to Salem (partly abandoned in 1995), and purchased the property in 1996. The company also leased a line between Albany and Mill City in 1993, but transferred the lease to the Albany and Eastern Railroad in October 2000.

== History ==
Willamette Valley Railway began in 1980, when Mike and David Root were in search of a shortline railroad to operate. They located an eight-mile shortline between Willamina and Grand Ronde, and purchased the railroad from International Paper. They resurrected a former name of the railroad, the Willamina and Grand Ronde Railway (W&GR). The railroad rostered a single Alco S-1 locomotive and began hauling lumber from the sawmills in Grande Ronde and Fort Hill to its connection with the Southern Pacific in Willamina. Within a few years, the line from Fort Hill to Grande Ronde was abandoned; however, operations between Willamina and Fort Hill continued until the mid-1990s when the railroad was sold to Hampton Lumber Sales, the owner of the Fort Hill Lumber Company. Hampton chose to contract with Willamette & Pacific Railroad, who now operated the line into Willamina, which ran trains into Fort Hill on an as-needed basis.

Shortly after purchasing the W&GR, the Root brothers also acquired a three-mile branchline in Independence. The railroad was the remnant of the Valley and Siletz Railroad which had been previously abandoned south and west of Independence. The railroad was acquired from Boise Cascade, which used the railroad to access its timberlands in Oregon's Coast Range as well as a sawmill located in Valsetz. This railroad was renamed the Willamette Valley Railroad. The railroad now rostered an EMD GP9 locomotive and two EMD SW1200 locomotives, all of Southern Pacific heritage. One of the SW-1200 locomotives was repainted into a scheme reminiscent of Southern Pacific's Shasta Daylight passenger train and lettered "Willamette Valley".

In Independence, the railroad maintained a locomotive shop to repair its fleet of locomotives as well as for other railroads.

In approximately 1988, the company took on a new name—Rail-West—and began to operate the Port of Tillamook Bay Railroad, a 90-mile line between Banks and Tillamook. This line was purchased from Southern Pacific by the Port of Tillamook Bay, and Rail-West became a contract operator on behalf of the port. This arrangement lasted until the early 1990s when the Port of Tillamook Bay began operating the railroad itself.

In 1992, Southern Pacific announced that it would begin the process of leasing its branchlines throughout western Oregon to shortline operators. While it was often rumored that the Willamette Valley/Willamina & Grande Ronde Railroads would take over the entire Willamina Branch, the combined company instead became the operator of the West Stayton, Geer and Mill City Branches. The Willamette & Pacific Railroad began operating the Westside and Willamina Branches which connected the two rail lines owned by Willamette Valley Railroad.

The newly expanded railroad acquired two EMD SD9s and one GP9 locomotive from the Southern Pacific to help operate the new lines. Within a few years, the railroad acquired three EMD GP35 locomotives also from Southern Pacific.

The Geer Branch, which was often seen as a "short-cut" from Salem, was redundant and was abandoned in 1995. The eastern portion of the branch exists to this day and is used for car storage, however much of the western portion of the branch has been removed and in some cases the original grade built over with new development (especially at the very western end, near Salem's Amtrak station. The softball field for Willamette University is located where the original junction once existed.)

In 1996, the Willamette Valley Railway converted its lease into a purchase, and now fully owned the former Southern Pacific branches it had leased only three years previously.

In 1998, the Albany and Eastern Railroad leased the Sweet Home Branch from the Burlington Northern and Santa Fe Railway (BNSF). This line connected with the existing Albany-Lebanon-Mill City line at Lebanon and continued southeasterly to Sweet Home. Since the 1930s, BNSF and its predecessors used trackage rights between Lebanon and Albany, and was a steam powered branch off of the otherwise electrified Oregon Electric Railway. At the same time, BNSF leased its "Oregon Electric" line from Salem to Eugene to the Portland and Western Railroad.

Shortly after taking over the Sweet Home Branch, Mike and David Root had split their railroad into two properties—the Willamette Valley Railway which consisted of the former West Stayton Branch, and the Albany and Eastern Railroad consisting of the former Mill City and Sweet Home Branches.

Also around this time, the two Root brothers bought out their other partner, George Lavacot. George retained ownership of the two SD9 locomotives as well as the remaining trackage in Independence, now scaled back to one-half mile connecting the railroad shop with the interchange yard with the Portland and Western Railroad. The track south of the shop was abandoned and today there are no shippers or industries on this line. George uses the shop to maintain his two SD9 locomotives as well as house a steam locomotive with the hopes of restoring it. In August 2008, Mr. Lavacot sold one of the SD9 locomotives, numbered 4433, to the Portland & Western Railroad; while retaining locomotive 5399 painted in a Southern Pacific "Black Widow" heritage paint scheme.

== Locomotive roster ==
- 2502 - EMD GP35, built in 1965 as Southern Pacific 7776, later 6673, later 6360
- 2503 - EMD GP35, built in 1964 as Southern Pacific 7430, later 6542, later 6361

== Former locomotives ==
- 110 - Alco S-1, built for International Paper. This locomotive is now owned by a preservation group in Yacolt, Washington.
- 201 - EMD SW-1200, built for Southern Pacific. This locomotive is now owned by the Port of Catoosa, Oklahoma.
- 2273 - EMD SW-1200, built for Southern Pacific. This locomotive is now owned by the Port of Catoosa, Oklahoma.
- 2501 - EMD GP35, built in 1963 as Southern Pacific 7412, later 6524, later 6303. This locomotive was transferred to the Albany and Eastern Railroad after the split of the company.
- 2890 - EMD GP9, built for Southern Pacific. This locomotive was scrapped, and its frame used for the prototype RailPower Green Goat locomotive.
- 3859 - EMD GP9, built in 1959 for Southern Pacific. This locomotive was transferred to the Albany and Eastern Railroad after the split of the company it was renumbered 1750
- 4364 - EMD SD9E, built in 1955 as Southern Pacific 5399, later 3877, later 4364. This locomotive is now owned by George Lavacot as SP 5399.
- 4413 - EMD SD9E, built in 1955 as Southern Pacific 5400, later 3878, later 4413. The disposition of this locomotive is unknown.
- 4433 - EMD SD9E, built in 1955 as Southern Pacific 5426, later 3904, later 4433. This locomotive is owned by Portland and Western as their 1854, now donated to the ORHF.

== See also ==
- Rail transportation in Oregon
