= Willamina Creek =

- Location of the mouth of Willamina Creek in Oregon

Location
- Country: United States
- State: Oregon
- County: Yamhill and Tillamook

Physical characteristics
- Source: Northern Oregon Coast Range
  - location: Yamhill County
  - coordinates: 45°16′14″N 123°24′34″W
  - elevation: 2,294 ft (699 m)
- Mouth: South Yamhill River
  - location: Willamina, Yamhill County
  - coordinates: 45°04′42″N 123°28′33″W
  - elevation: 217 ft (66 m)
- Length: 20 mi (32 km)
- Basin size: 81.6 sq mi (211 km^{2})

Willamina Creek is a tributary, about 20 miles (32 km) long, of the South Yamhill River in the U.S. state of Oregon. Beginning in the Northern Oregon Coast Range in Yamhill County, it briefly enters and exits a small part of eastern Tillamook County, then flows generally south to meet the larger stream at Willamina, near the border with Polk County.

== Course ==
From its source northeast of Stony Mountain, the creek flows south, passing under Willamina Creek Road about 18 miles (29 km) above the mouth. The road follows the creek from here to Willamina. Turning west, the creek passes over Willamina Falls between river miles (RM) 17 and 16 (river kilometers 27 and 26) and enters Tillamook County. Veering south again, it flows through segments of Tillamook State Forest before re-entering Yamhill County about 13 miles (21 km) from the mouth. It passes Buck Hollow Cemetery and then flows through Blackwell Park at about RM 5 (RK 8). Turning east at Willamina, it enters the South Yamhill River about 43 miles (69 km) from the larger stream's mouth. Named tributaries of Willamina Creek from source to mouth are Cedar, East, Coast, and Tindle creeks.

== Waterfall ==
The Northwest Waterfall Survey describes Willamina Falls as a "veiling plunge" that is 40 feet (12 m) high and 20 feet (6 m) wide. It estimates the average discharge at this point at 150 cubic feet per second (4.2 m^{3}/s) with the highest flows in winter and spring. The waterfall is on private land.

== Recreation ==
Blackwell Park is a county recreational area along Willamina Road and the creek about 4.5 miles (7 km) north of Willamina. The 6-acre (2.4 ha) site offers stream views, picnic sites, fishing, barbecue pits, and a public toilet. Two families named Blackwell donated the land for the park in 1957.

Fishing in Oregon calls the creek "a good little trout stream". The creek offers catch-and-release fishing for wild cutthroat up to 11 inches (28 cm) long.

== See also ==
- List of rivers of Oregon
