= Willamina High School =

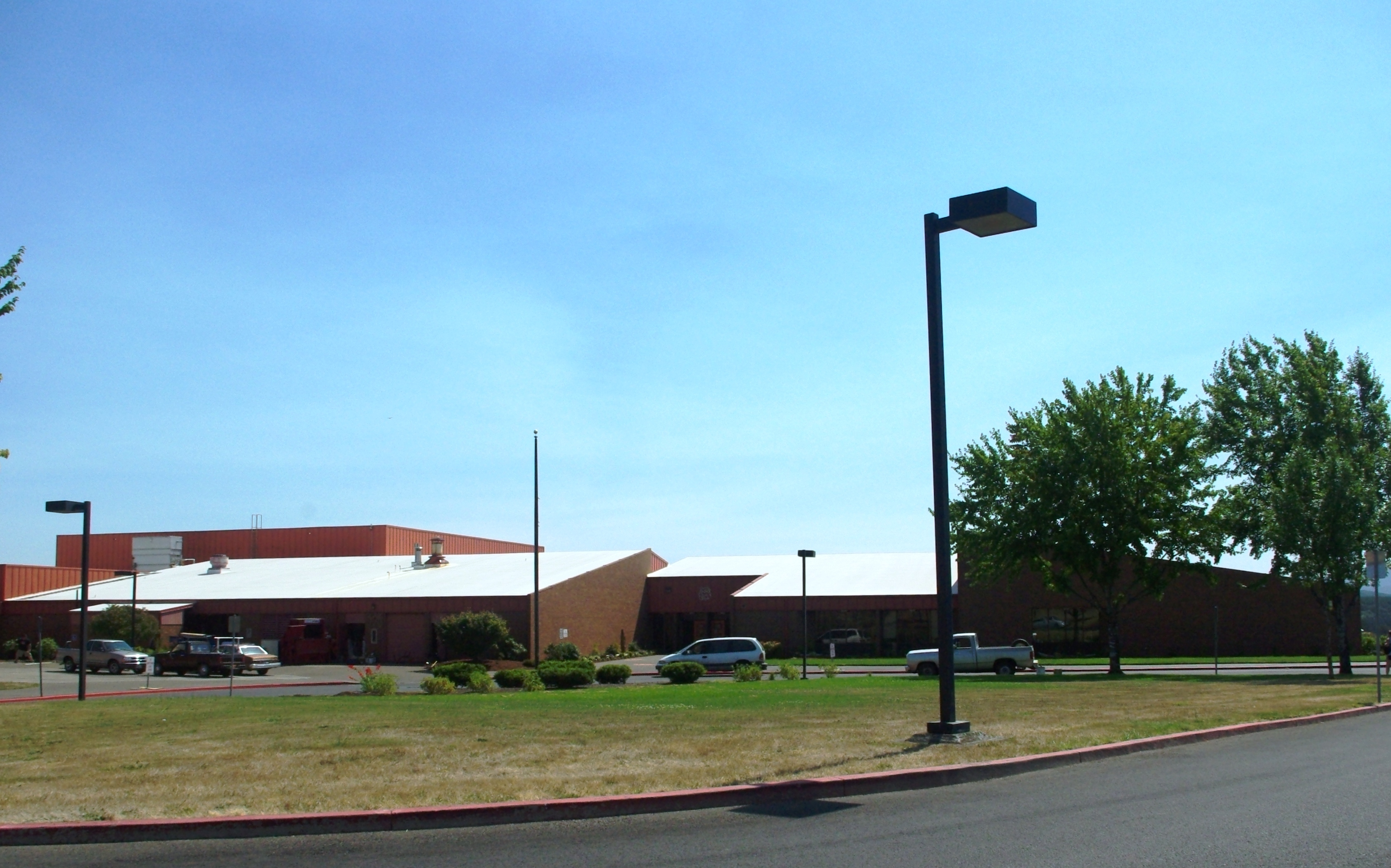

Location
- 1100 Oaken Hills Drive; Willamina, Yamhill County, Oregon 97396; United States; 45.075794°N 123.483624°W

Information
- Type: Public
- School district: Willamina School District
- Principal: Jami Fluke
- Teaching staff: 16.00 (FTE)
- Grades: 9-12
- Enrollment: 313 (2023-2024)
- Student to teacher ratio: 19.56
- Campus: Rural
- Colors: Beaver Orange and Black
- Athletics conference: OSAA 2A-2 Tri-River Conference
- Mascot: Bulldog
- Team name: Bulldogs
- Website: www.willamina.k12.or.us/schools/wmhs

Willamina High School is a public high school in Willamina, Oregon, United States.

== History ==
Willamina High School was previously known as "Willamina Union High School." The original building opened in 1940. In 2003 the school closed due to lack of funding for building renovations and improvements. The old building was later purchased by The Confederated Tribes of Grand Ronde for $675,000. A new Willamina High School was eventually built in 2015.

== Academics ==
In 2008, 71% of the school's seniors received their high school diploma. Of 84 students, 60 graduated, 17 dropped out, 1 received a modified diploma, and 6 were still in high school.

In 2022, 84% of the school's seniors received a high school diploma. Of 74 students, 69 graduated, and 5 dropped out.

== Athletics ==
Willamina High School athletic teams compete in the OSAA 2A-2 Tri-River Conference. The athletic director is Jerry Buczynski.

State championships:

- Baseball: 1986, 2009
- Softball: 2010
- Wrestling: 1992, 1993, 1994, 1999, 2004
