= Yamhill River =

River in Oregon, United States

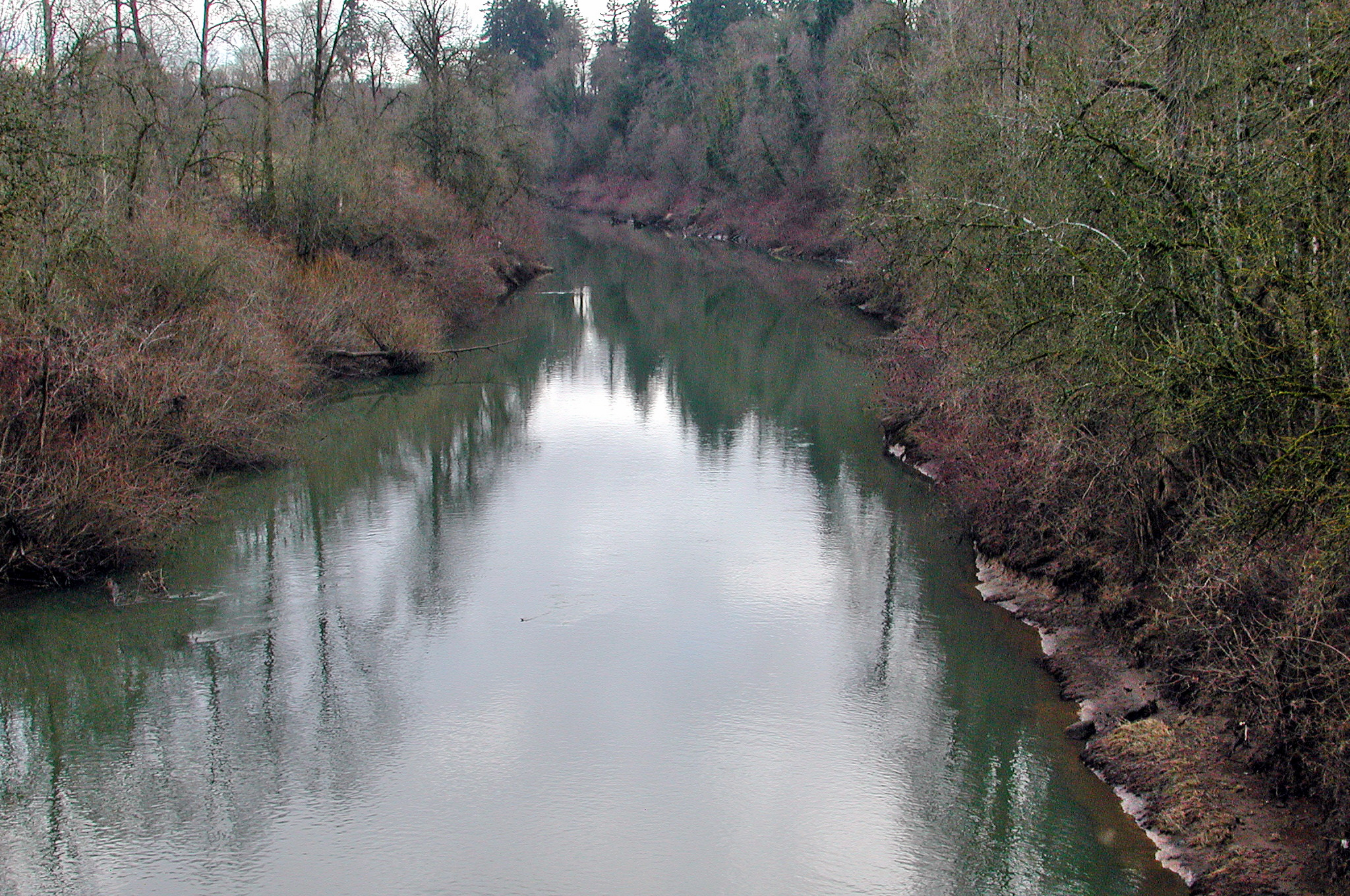
- Yamhill River at Dayton

- Location of the mouth of the Yamhill River in Oregon
- Etymology: Uncertain but probably after a local Kalapuya tribe

Location
- Country: United States
- State: Oregon
- County: Yamhill

Physical characteristics
- Source: confluence of South Yamhill River and North Yamhill River
  - location: between McMinnville and Dayton, Yamhill County, Oregon
  - coordinates: 45°13′33″N 123°08′42″W
  - elevation: 152 ft (46 m)
- Mouth: Willamette River
  - location: Yamhill County, Oregon
  - coordinates: 45°13′47″N 122°59′52″W
  - elevation: 59 ft (18 m)
- Length: 11 mi (18 km)
- Basin size: 837 sq mi (2,170 km^{2})

The Yamhill River is an 11-mile (18 km) tributary of the Willamette River, in the U.S. state of Oregon. Formed by the confluence of the South Yamhill River and the North Yamhill River about 3 miles (5 km) east of McMinnville, it drains part of the Northern Oregon Coast Range. The river meanders east past Dayton to join the Willamette River at its river mile (RM) 55 or river kilometer (RK) 89, south of Newberg.

It is likely that Yamhill was the 19th century white settlers' name for a tribe of Native Americans, a Kalapuya people who inhabited the region. The Yamhill people were among 27 bands and tribes moved to the Grand Ronde Indian Reservation, formally established in 1857.

== Course ==
Formed by the confluence of the South Yamhill and North Yamhill rivers about 3 miles (4.8 km) east of McMinnville, the main stem Yamhill River flows generally east for about 11 miles (18 km) to the Willamette River, a tributary of the Columbia River. At about RM 9 (RK 14), Hawn Creek and then Millican Creek enter from the left as the Yamhill nears Lafayette, which lies to the river's left. Beyond Lafayette, Henry Creek enters from the left. Near Dayton, the river passes under Oregon Route 18 before skirting the city, which lies to its right at RM 5 (RK 8). Here Palmer Creek enters from the right. Below Dayton, the river enters the Willamette at its RM 55 (RK 89) south of Newberg.

== Lock and dam ==
In 1900 a Yamhill River lock and dam lock and dam was completed about 1.5 miles downriver from Lafayette, Oregon. The lock was decommissioned in 1954. The dam was deliberately destroyed in 1963 to allow better passage for salmon on the river. The site of the lock and dam is now a county park.

== Gallery ==
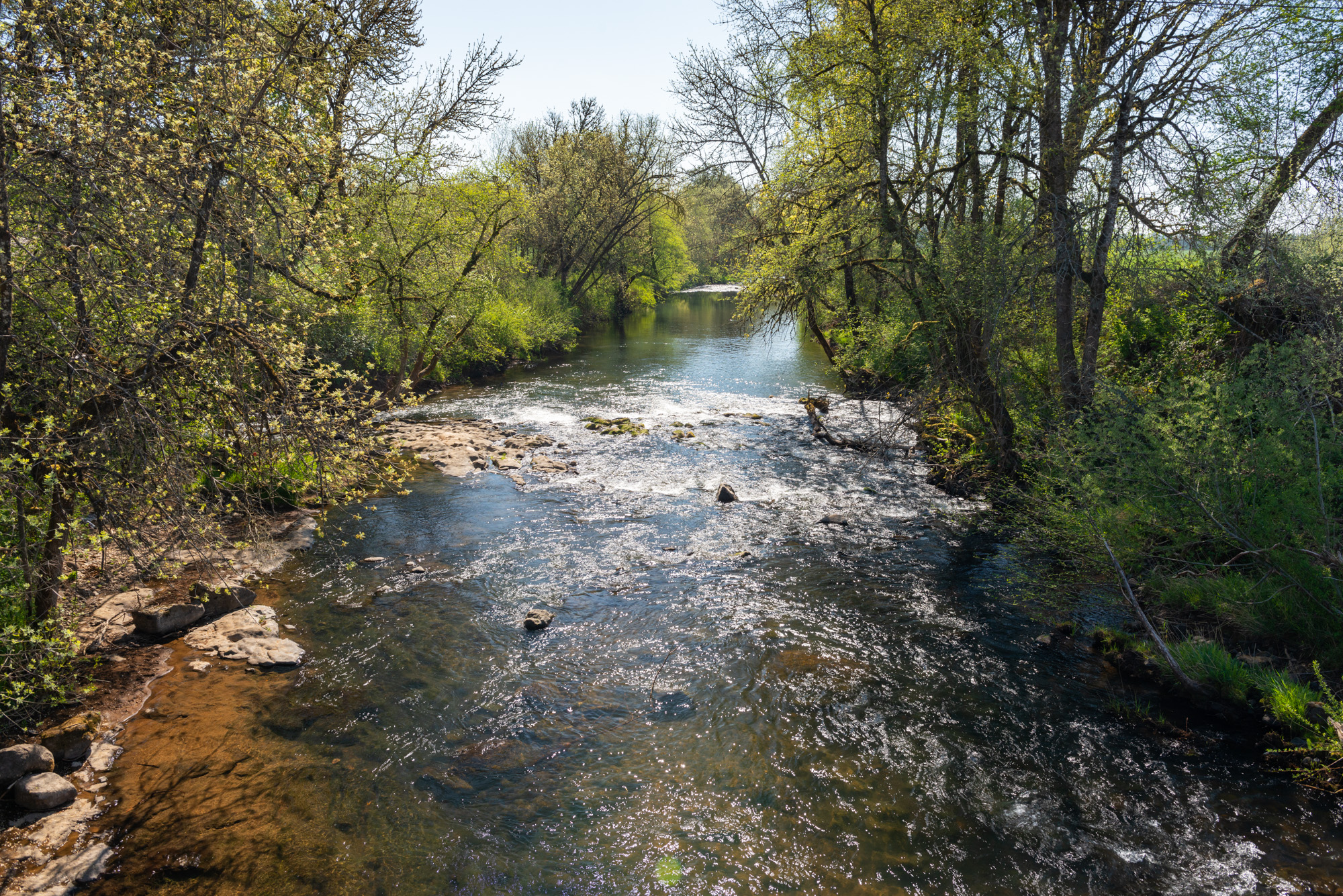
Yamhill River at Rockyford Road, 2021.

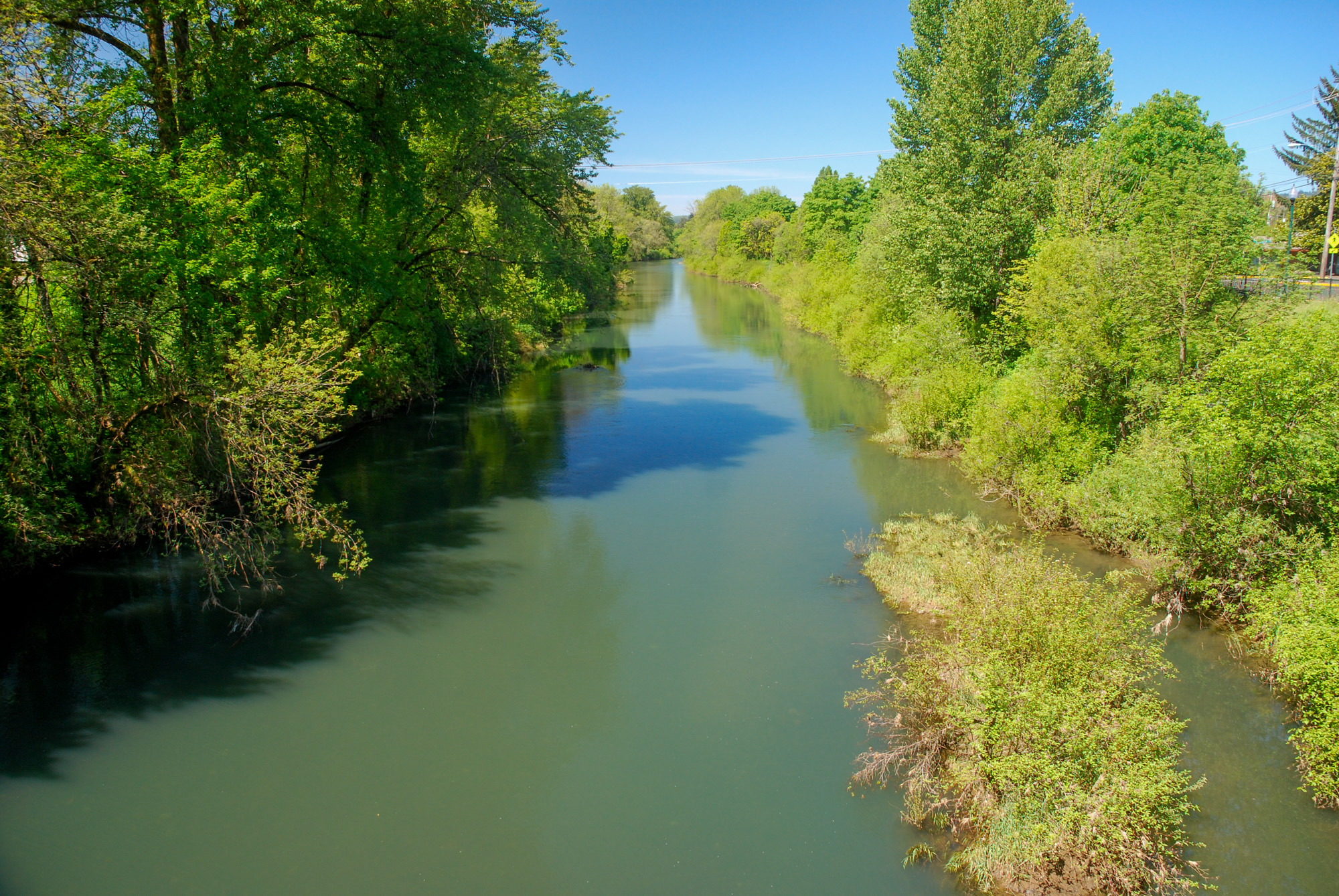
Yamhill River at Sheridan, Oregon, 2010.

== See also ==
- List of Oregon rivers
