= Fort Hill, Oregon =

Unincorporated community in the state of Oregon, United States

Fort Hill
- Census-designated place
- Interactive map of Fort Hill
- Coordinates: 45°04′01″N 123°33′38″W
- Elevation: 105 m (345 ft)

Population
  - Estimate (2020): 154
- Area code(s): 541 & 458
- GNIS feature ID: 2629773

Fort Hill is an unincorporated community in Polk and Yamhill counties in Oregon, United States. It is located about a mile east of Spirit Mountain Casino on Oregon Route 22 near the South Yamhill River. For statistical purposes, the United States Census Bureau has defined Fort Hill as a census-designated place (CDP). As of the 2020 census, Fort Hill had a population of 154. The census definition of the area may not precisely correspond to local understanding of the area with the same name. The hill of the same name, located just east of Valley Junction, was the site of a blockhouse built by settlers in 1855–1856. The blockhouse became part of Fort Yamhill, and was later moved to Grand Ronde Agency and is now located in Dayton.

== Demographics ==
As of the 2020 census there were 154 people, 79 housing units, and 98 families in the CDP. There were 116 White people, 0 African Americans, 16 Native Americans, 2 Asians, 2 from some other race, and 18 from two or more races. There were 14 people with Hispanic or Latino origin.

The median age in Fort Hill was 57.9 years old. 43.4% of the population were between the ages of 75 and 84. 30.1% of the population were veterans.

The median household income was $16,914, but 0.0% of the population were in poverty.
