= Yamhill County Courthouse =

Courthouse in McMinnville, Oregon, U.S.

Coordinates: 45.211853°N 123.192664°W

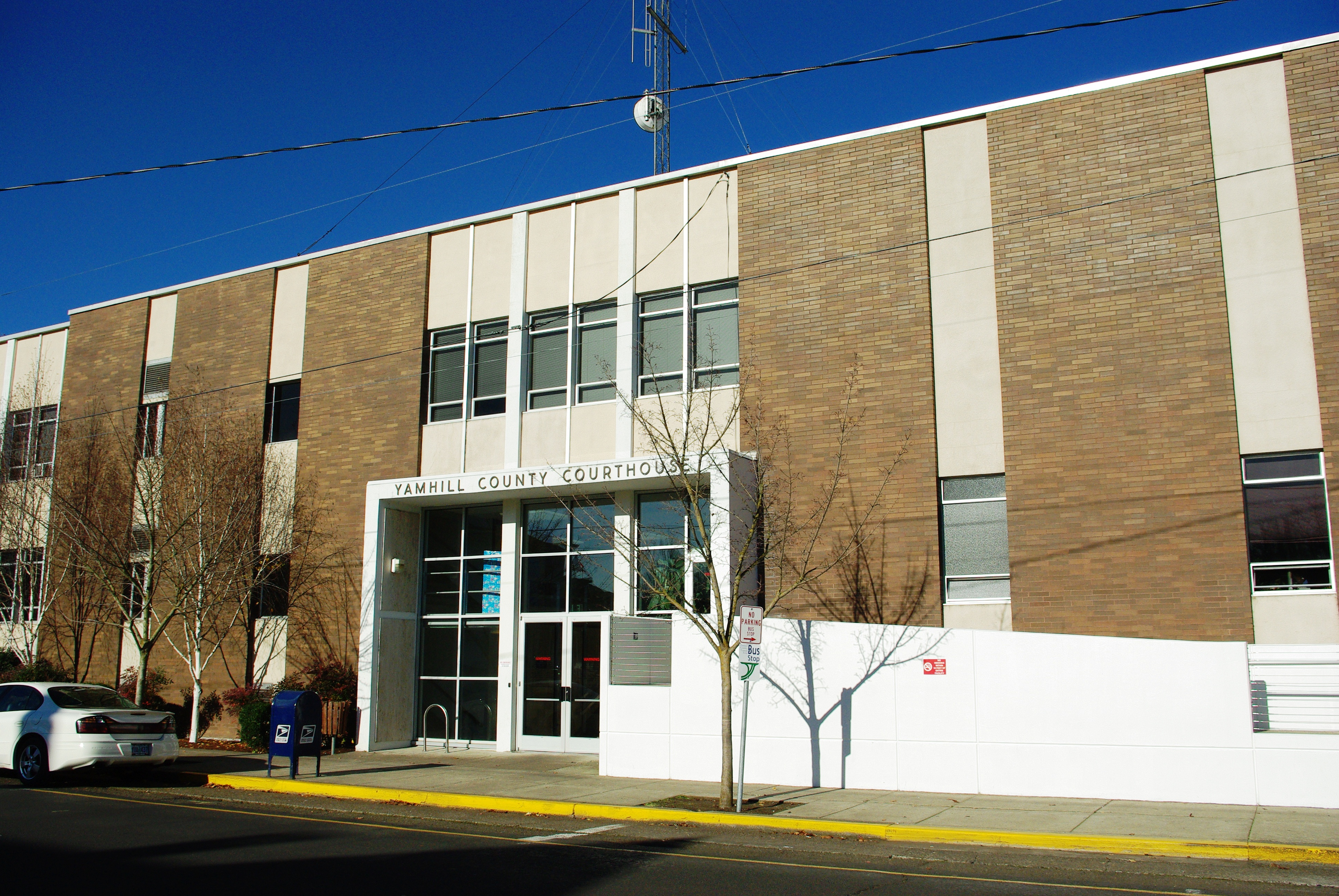
Current courthouse in McMinnville

The Yamhill County Courthouse is a courthouse in Yamhill County, Oregon, United States. Though Yamhill County has had a series of historic courthouses, the first being completed in 1860, the current courthouse dates to 1963.

== History ==
In December 1846, Joel Perkins, founder of Lafayette, laid out the townsite and persuaded the House of Representatives of the Provisional Government to declare it as the seat of Yamhill County. In the years 1846–50, the various courts were convened in a large, unused room in Hawn's tavern, since there was no courthouse existed. By 1850, the county purchased a courthouse from Lem Scott for $800. This building was at the corner of Third and Jefferson, and seated about 100 people. It burned down in the last week of January, 1857; arson was suspected, but never confirmed.

== 1860 courthouse ==
In September 1857, a petition that was signed by 396 voters called for an election to relocate the seat of county government. In April 1858, W. T. Newby (founder of McMinnville) proposed giving 5 acres (20,000 m^{2}) or 140 lots to the county if McMinnville was chosen as site of the new courthouse. Joel Palmer (founder of Dayton), along with others from his town, proposed giving 32 lots plus $800 towards the new courthouse. In August 1858, Lafayette was chosen by the people to be the site of the new courthouse. Court was being held in the second story of James R. McBride's house in Lafayette, rented for $100 per year.

Medorem Crawford was appointed by the board of commissioners, in October 1858, to call for furnished plans and specifications for the new courthouse, and by December, an architect had been paid for plans and specifications. The superintendent of common schools was ordered to sell all school lands to the highest bidders for a minimum of $5 per acre to help fund the proposed structure. Rush Mendenhall was given the contract to begin construction of the new building in February 1859 for $14,875.

The new courthouse was completed, and the various offices were relocated to it on February 11, 1860. Problems with this courthouse lingered into the mid-1870s. There was a dispute regarding the original sale of lots in 1850 for the first courthouse, and the county was threatened with a lawsuit relating to a cloud in the title of property purportedly owned by one Bartlett Whitlow. In the words of the board, "the title of the whole townsite is liable to be involved in almost endless litigation" due to this dispute. Mr. Whitlow was paid $125 for his interest in the townsite and the case went away.

== 1889 courthouse ==
By 1877, crime was becoming a major concern in the county, and the need for a new jail became a priority. It was built during the fall and winter of 1877–1878, by F. M. Vanderpool for $5,900, to include two iron cells. It was located across Jefferson Street from the northwest corner of the courthouse.

It was about this time that various problems arose regarding the maintenance of the courthouse and grounds. For example, a September 1883 entry reads,

The Sheriff be and hereby is directed to remove the pump from the well at the courthouse and have a good and sufficient curb windlass rope and bucket placed therein.

There can be little doubt that these problems fueled another effort to relocate the courthouse by the fall of 1887, when the Oregon Legislature ordered a county-wide election be held to determine the seat of county government in Yamhill County.

McMinnville was the selected site, and in April 1888, Hiram Tucker deeded a 200' x 180' lot in McMinnville for the new courthouse, and the board accordingly ordered that "said grounds be and the same are selected and adopted as the site and grounds for a courthouse and county building". The contract for the new building was let to the Pauly Jail Building and Manufacturing Company, for $45,000. Sebastian Brutscher, one of the county commissioners, protested the partial payment to the contractor for construction activities during the fall 1888; he strongly believed that the actions taken to build the new structure and relocate to McMinnville were illegal. Final construction costs, including a jail, approached $62,000. The new courthouse covered an area of 9,000 square feet (840 m^{2}) and was 121 feet (37 m) high.

Being sensitive to the local furor regarding the matter, the board of commissioners published a notice on December 1, 1888 that

on Monday the 7th of January, 1889, that all records, files, books, papers and documents of every nature, kind and description belonging to said Yamhill County now on file and kept in the various offices and in custody of the various officers of said county in Lafayette and all of the office furniture, fixtures, implements and movable property belonging to said county shall be removed from their present place of keeping to the new County Seat in the town of McMinnville.

The old courthouse in Lafayette was donated to the Evangelical Church and was used as a seminary school until 1900, thereafter serving as a broom factory. This brick structure was still in good condition when it was torn down in 1922.

The first official session of the board of commissioners in the new courthouse was on January 9, 1889. The first full-time janitor/groundskeeper was J. H. Clubine. He was to "keep the Court Rooms and all halls clean and tidy, and the wood boxes for all, offices and Court Rooms filled with wood, as well as mow the lawns and keep the grounds in as good condition as possible, for which he is to receive $10 per month." Tales of a "midnight" horse ride by McMinnville citizens to "steal" all official county records and other assets and remove them to the new building arose within a few decades, but contemporary newspaper articles indicate the move was done in a peaceful manner in broad daylight, albeit under guard.

By 1890, water was being supplied to the courthouse by the McMinnville Water Works, and electric lights were furnished by 1892. In the early 1890s, the water and light bill ran between $10 and $13 per month.

== 1963 courthouse ==
By the mid-1950s, water leaks in the roof and resultant dry rot threatened the building's structural integrity, and caused electrical problems. A fire on August 9, 1954, damaged the courthouse enough to generate county-wide discussions regarding a new building. Maintenance costs for the building were reaching new highs, and county citizens eventually approved a $1,000,000 bond for construction of the present structure in 1959. The cornerstone was set for the existing courthouse on October 5, 1963; it was completed and occupied in 1964. The new courthouse was largely constructed around the old, and the latter was demolished to make way for the new building.
