= South Yamhill River =

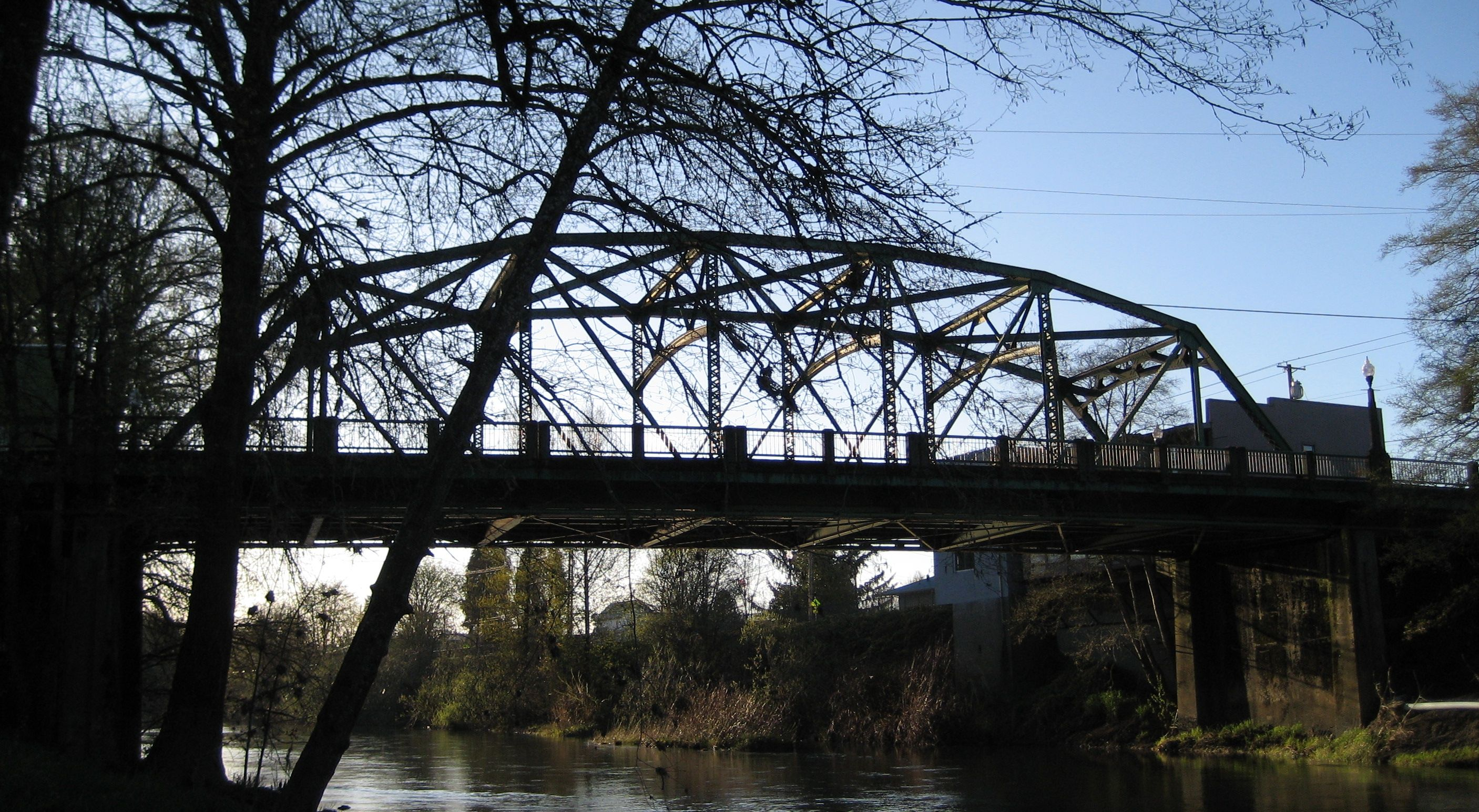
- Bridge over the river at Sheridan

- Location of the mouth of South Yamhill River in Oregon
- Etymology: Uncertain but probably after a local Kalapuya tribe

Location
- Country: United States
- State: Oregon
- Counties: Polk and Yamhill

Physical characteristics
- Source: Northern Oregon Coast Range
  - location: Siuslaw National Forest, in western Yamhill County, Oregon
  - coordinates: 45°06′38″N 123°43′40″W
  - elevation: 551 ft (168 m)
- Mouth: Yamhill River
  - location: between McMinnville and Dayton, Yamhill County, Oregon
  - coordinates: 45°13′33″N 123°08′41″W
  - elevation: 75 ft (23 m)
- Length: 60 mi (97 km)
- Basin size: 492 sq mi (1,270 km^{2})
- Discharge
  - location: McMinnville, Oregon, 5.6 miles (9.0 km) from mouth
  - average: 1,801 cu ft/s (51.0 m^{3}/s)
  - minimum: 0.58 cu ft/s (0.016 m^{3}/s)
  - maximum: 47,100 cu ft/s (1,330 m^{3}/s)

The South Yamhill River is a tributary of the Yamhill River, approximately 60 miles (97 km) long, in northwest Oregon in the United States. It drains an area of the Northern Oregon Coast Range, as well as part of the Willamette Valley west of the Willamette River.

== Course ==
The South Yamhill River rises at an elevation of 551 feet (168 m) above sea level and falls 476 feet (145 m) between source and mouth to an elevation of 75 feet (23 m). It begins at the confluence of Hanchet Creek and Kitten Creek in the Siuslaw National Forest of the Northern Oregon Coast Range. The source, at about river mile (RM) 60 or river kilometer (RK) 97 lies near the border between Tillamook and Yamhill counties west of the Grand Ronde Community, an Indian reservation. Flowing southeast on the north side of Oregon Route 22 in Yamhill County, the river receives Pierce Creek and Ead Creek from the left, and Cedar Creek from the right before flowing under the highway at about RM 57 (RK 92). Continuing parallel to the highway, which lies to its left, the river receives Crooked Creek from the left and Elmer Creek from the right before passing Midway and entering Polk County at about RM 55 (RK 89). Just beyond the county border, Agency Creek enters from the left. About 1 mile (1.6 km) later, the river receives the Rogue River from the left, reaches Grand Ronde, and passes under Grand Ronde Road and Oregon Route 18, a highway connecting the Portland metropolitan area to the Oregon Coast. Shortly thereafter, Rock Creek enters from the right.

Turning east and running roughly parallel to Route 18, the river receives Rowell Creek from the right before passing under the highway for the second time at Valley Junction and receiving Casper Creek from the left at about RM 50 (RK 80). Running north of Route 18 for about 1 mile (1.6 km), the stream receives Klees Creek from the left and passes under the highway for the third time at Fort Hill. Flowing south of the highway, the river receives Gold Creek, Lady Creek, and Doane Creek, all from the right, and Cockerham Creek from the left before passing under Route 18 for the fourth time at about RM 45 (RK 72). Shortly thereafter, it reaches Willamina, re-entering Yamhill County and receiving Willamina Creek from the left at about RM 43 (RK 69). About 2 miles (3.2 km) later, Ash Creek enters from the left.

Continuing generally east and running between West Valley Highway on the left and Route 18 on the right, the river meanders slightly north of east, receiving Mill Creek from the right and Rock Creek from the left before reaching Sheridan at about RM 38 (RK 61). About 1 mile (1.6 km) later, it passes under Route 18 for the fifth time and meanders generally east until turning north, still roughly parallel to the highway, at RM 30 (RK 48). About 5 miles (8.0 km) later, Deer Creek enters from the left, and 7 miles (11 km) later, Salt Creek enters from the right. Shortly thereafter, the South Yamhill River passes under Oregon Route 99W and continues northeast toward McMinnville Municipal Airport. In a series of wide meanders starting at about RM 10 (RK 16), the river turns away from the airport and flows under Route 18 for the sixth and last time at RM 5.6 (RK 9.0), the site of a stream gauge maintained by the United States Geological Survey (USGS). The river flows by the east side of McMinnville, where it receives Cozine Creek from the left. It continues generally northeast to join the North Yamhill River to form the Yamhill River, an 11-mile (18 km) tributary of the Willamette River.

== River levels ==
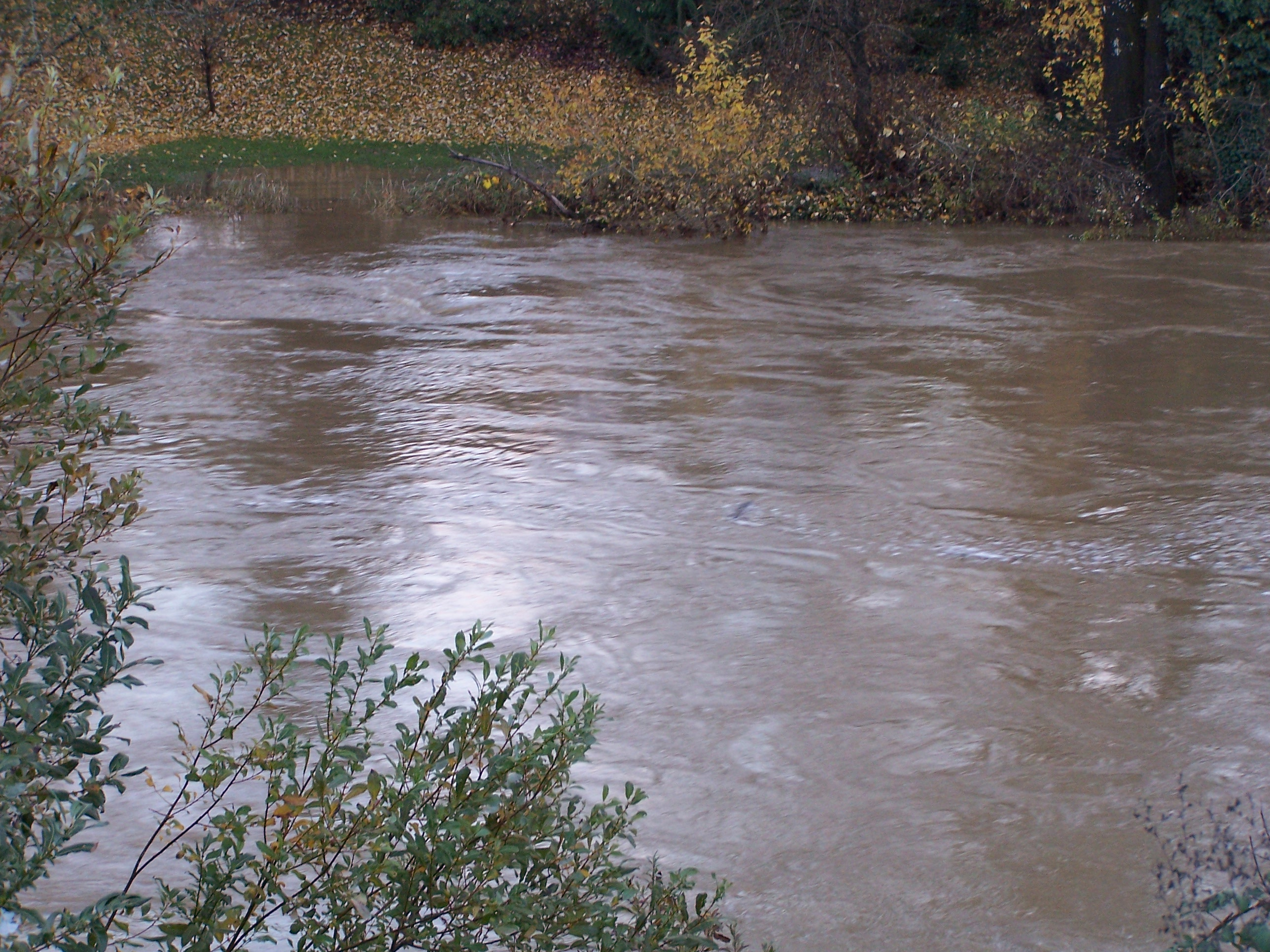
Minor flooding in November 2006

The National Weather Service measures river levels at two locations along the South Yamhill River. Near Willamina, the highest recorded water level was about 17 feet (5 m) in December 1964. No low-water records are available for this gauge. At McMinnville, the highest recorded water level was about 59 feet (18 m) in February 1996, and the lowest was zero in October 1996.

== See also ==
- List of rivers of Oregon
- List of longest streams of Oregon
- Sheridan Bridge
