= Spirit Mountain Casino (Oregon) =

Native American casino in Oregon

Coordinates: 45.058°N 123.581°W

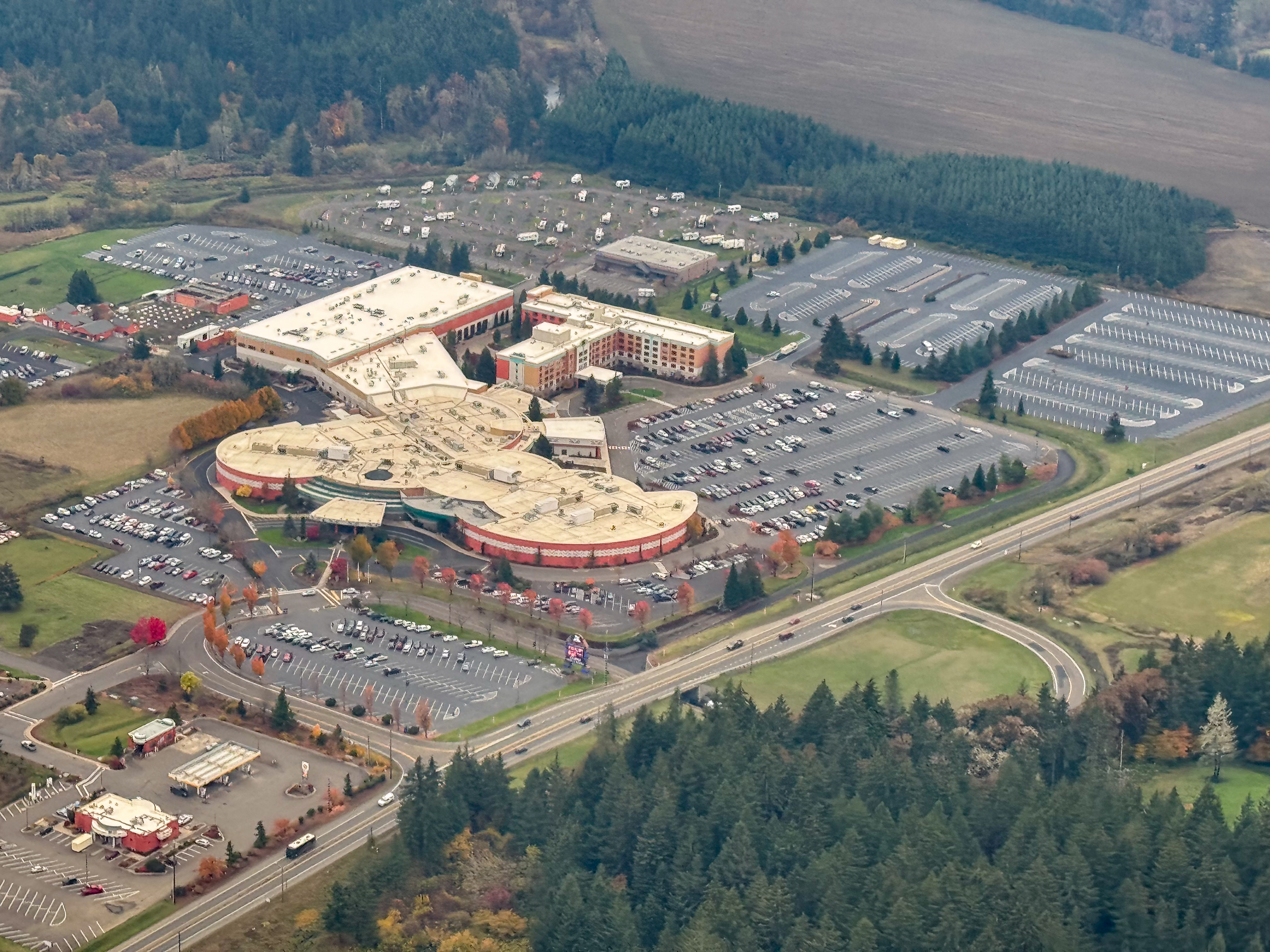
- Aerial view of casino
- Interactive map of Spirit Mountain Casino
- Location: Grand Ronde, Oregon; 27100 SW Salmon River Hwy Grand Ronde, Oregon 97347
- Opened: October, 1995
- No. of rooms: 254 (14 suites)
- Gaming space: 90,000 sq ft (8,400 m^{2})
- Notable restaurants: Rock Creek Court Deli; Mountain View Sports Bar; Amoré; Stadium Bar; 10 Barrel Hop Yard
- Casino type: Land-based
- Owner: Confederated Tribes of Grand Ronde
- Website: http://www.spiritmountain.com

Spirit Mountain Casino is a Native American casino located in Grand Ronde, Oregon, United States on Oregon Route 18. It is operated by the Confederated Tribes of the Grand Ronde Community of Oregon, and was created to "enhance economic self-sufficiency opportunities for the Confederated Tribes of Grand Ronde, its members and surrounding communities; to promote economic diversification by the Tribes: to support a variety of housing, educational and cultural programs under the direction of Tribal Council". It is the state's busiest tourist attraction, drawing three million visitors a year.

The casino's amenities include a 254-room hotel, 90,000 square feet (8,400 m^{2}) of gaming floors, five restaurants, live entertainment and other special events. Games include 2,000 slot machines, blackjack, pai gow poker, roulette, and keno.

== Notable performers ==
- 2024: Vanilla Ice, Third Eye Blind
- 2017: Billy Ray Cyrus
- 2015: Ron White
- 2014: Wanda Sykes, Callaghan, Ashley Monroe, Chicago, Delta Rae, Kellie Pickler, Will Hoge, Herman's Hermits, Bill Engvall, Craig Cambell, Bret Michaels
- 2013: Keith Sweat, Bob Newhart, America, George Lopez, Three Dog Night, The Golden Boys, Kool & The Gang, Ron White, Brian Setzer
- 2012: The Isley Brothers, Tanya Tucker, Lonestar, Randy Travis, Tony Bennett, Don Rickles, Toni Braxton, Boyz II Men, Neil Sedaka, Dana Carvey, Merle Haggard, Smokey Robinson, Bill Engvall, Wanda Sykes, 38 Special, Dennis DeYoung, Boz Scaggs, Sugar Ray, Chris Isaak

== Spirit Mountain Community Fund ==
Six percent of the profits from the casino goes to the Spirit Mountain Community Fund (SMCF) and are in turn donated to organizations in western Oregon, an area which includes eleven counties: Clackamas, Multnomah, Washington, Tillamook, Lincoln, Yamhill, Polk, Marion, Benton, Linn, and Lane. Since 1998, the SMCF has also funded the Mark O. Hatfield Fellowship to enable a Native American to serve as a staff member to a member of the U.S. congressional delegation from Oregon.

== See also ==
- Gambling in Oregon
- Happy Dragon Chinese Restaurant, operated an outpost at the casino
- List of casinos in Oregon
