= Grand Ronde, Oregon =

- Census-designated place (CDP)
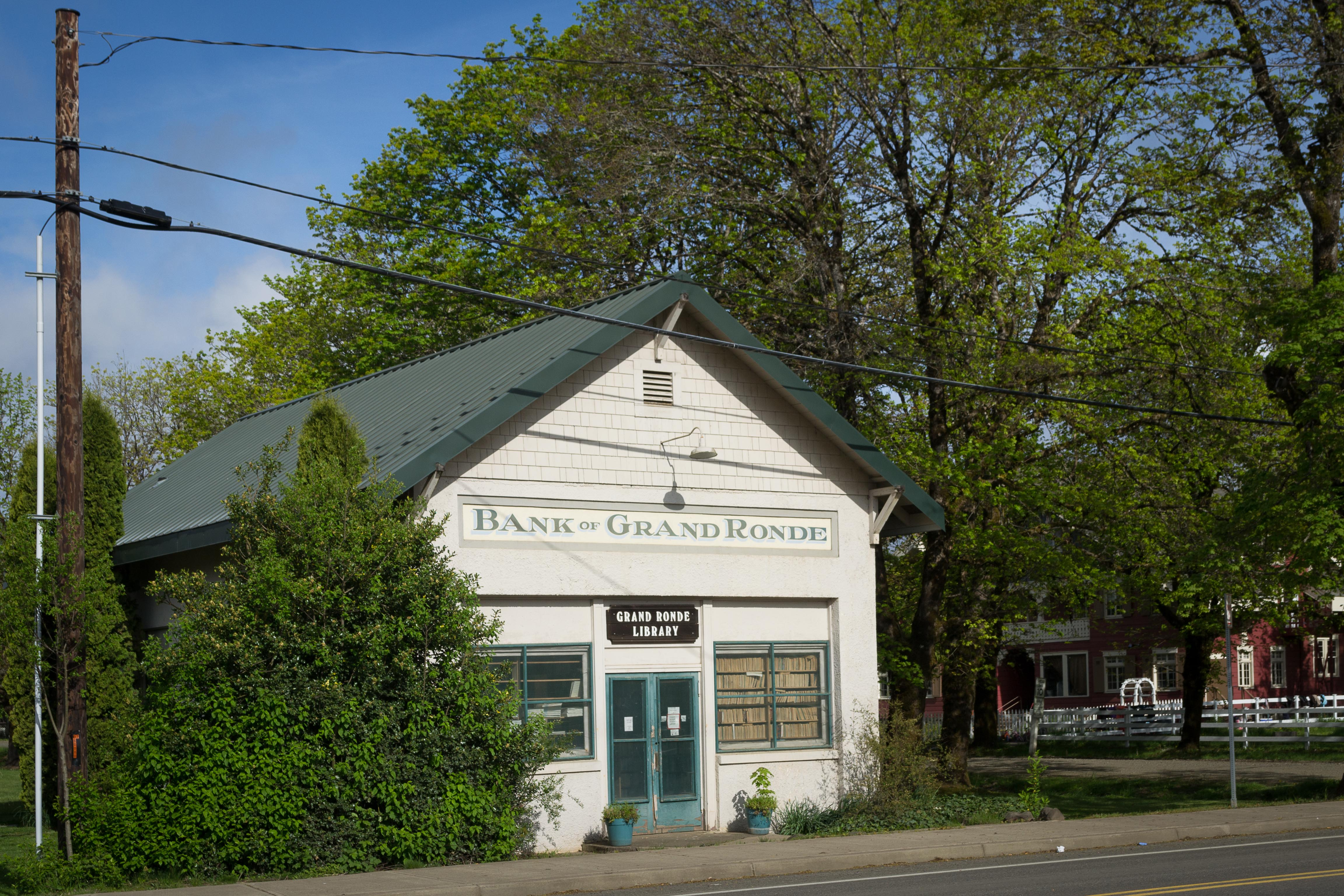
- The Grand Ronde Public Library

- Location of Grand Ronde within Polk County, Oregon
- Coordinates: 45°04′25″N 123°37′16″W
- Country: United States
- State: Oregon
- County: Polk & Yamhill

Area
  - Total: 19.20 sq mi (49.72 km^{2})
  - Land: 19.20 sq mi (49.72 km^{2})
  - Water: 0 sq mi (0.00 km^{2})
- Elevation: 338 ft (103 m)

Population (2020)
  - Total: 2,010
  - Density: 104.7/sq mi (40.43/km^{2})
- Time zone: UTC-8 (Pacific (PST))
  - Summer (DST): UTC-7 (PDT)
- ZIP code: 97347
- Area code: 503
- FIPS code: 41-30300
- GNIS feature ID: 2408316

Grand Ronde is a census-designated place (CDP) and unincorporated community in Polk and Yamhill counties, Oregon, United States. Historically noted as a village in Polk County, the sphere of influence and community is in both Polk and Yamhill counties. The name of the community is a variation of the French Grande Ronde or "Grand Round" which could be about the large round-up of Native American peoples in the area who were settled on what was known as the Grand Ronde Indian Reservation, or possibly referencing the shape of the valley in which the community is located. As of the 2020 census, Grand Ronde had a population of 2,010. It is part of the Salem Metropolitan Statistical Area.

== History ==
On January 4, 1855, a treaty between the various bands of Kalapuyans and Oregon Superintendent of Indian Affairs Joel Palmer was effected, calling for the various bands to remove to a reservation to be established by the government. For this purpose the Grand Ronde Indian Reservation was opened on June 30, 1857, covering 60,000 acres in northwest Polk and southwest Yamhill counties. A census conducted in 1870 reported only 47 Yamels and 36 Luckiamutes on the reservation; in 1910 the Yamels numbered five, the Luckiamutes, eight. By the end of the historic period, the Kalapuyan people no longer existed as a distinct cultural-racial entity.

According to a Cultural Resources Report from the Oregon Department of Transportation, the town of Grand Ronde began as "New Grand Ronde" in about 1908 when the first large groups of Indians were leaving the Reservation and establishing their own farms and ranches under the Dawes Act. In 1921, International Harvester laid out a town site. In 1922 the company built nine miles of track from Willamina to Grand Ronde, calling it the Willamina and Grand Ronde Railroad. The short railroad connected the area with the Southern Pacific railroad at Willamina. The railroad helped the timber industry to flourish and made it possible for lumber mills to grow and dominate the economy of the area. Grand Ronde became the center of support services for mill workers and a train depot, store, hotel, movie theater, diner, gas station, bank, post office, church, and a small residential area were built.

The Spaulding-Miami Lumber Company created and owned the town proper in the early 1920s as part of its logging operations. A rail line and several related buildings were built as well as a hotel. A spur of the railroad headed south out of the town across Rock Creek and into the coastal range. Electricity was brought to the town in 1922 according to the Lumber World Review, Volume 42, published in January 1922.

The Confederated Tribes of the Grand Ronde Community own and operate Spirit Mountain Casino, which is a major local employer. In 1997, the casino created the Spirit Mountain Community Fund, which supports several charities both within Polk County and throughout Oregon from the casino's gambling revenue. In January 2010, the CDP was expanded to include areas located inside Yamhill County.

There was quite a bit of communication about the name of the town going back and forth between the Oregon Geographic Board and the United States Geographic Board starting in 1919. Initially, the State was calling for the town to be officially named "Grande Ronde" using the typical French spelling, (possibly due to the history of French Canadian fur trapping in the area via the Hudson Bay Company), though through research and correspondence lasting into the early 1940s, the name as spelled currently, "Grand Ronde", was made official.

== Geography ==
According to the United States Census Bureau, the CDP has a total area of 0.6 square miles (1.6 km^{2}), all of it land. The community is located 344 feet (105 m) above sea-level.

This area is considered to be in Eco Sub-Region 3c by data published by Oregon State University and is described as "The nearly level to undulating Prairie Terraces ecoregion includes all of the terraces of the Willamette River upstream of the Portland/Vancouver Basin (3a). Ecoregion 3c is drained by low-gradient, meandering streams and rivers. Its broad fluvial terraces once supported oak savanna and prairies that were maintained by burning; wetter areas supported Oregon ash and black cottonwood. Today, only relict native prairie remains. The poorly drained soils derived from glacio-lacustrine deposits are extensively farmed for grass seed and small grains. Grasses tolerate poor drainage and poor rooting conditions better than other crops. In addition to agriculture, the Prairie Terraces also experience the bulk of urban expansion"

=== Climate ===
The overall climate of Grand Ronde can be considered a temperate climate. This is characteristic of areas with wet, mild winters and warm, dry summers.

Grand Ronde is located in the Oregon Coast Range, which is one of the wettest places in the contiguous United States. Precipitation data has been gathered in Grand Ronde sporadically since 1910 and continuously since 1948. That data shows the average annual precipitation from 1971 to 2000 to be 101.01 inches (2,566 mm).

In contrast, rainfall in Willamina, approximately 7 miles (11 km) away, is 50.90 inches (1,293 mm). Additionally, precipitation at Laurel Mountain, located about 9 miles (14 km) to the southeast and further up in the Oregon Coast Range, comes down at an average rate of 121.48 inches (3,086 mm) per year.

== Demographics ==
Historical population
Census	Pop.	Note	%±
2020	2,010		—
U.S. Decennial Census

As of the census of 2010, there were 1,661 people in 658 households residing in Grand Ronde

As of the census of 2000, there were 271 people, 113 households, and 61 families residing in the CDP. The population density was 413.8 people per square mile (159.8 people/km^{2}). There were 140 housing units at an average density of 213.8 per square mile (82.5/km^{2}). The racial makeup of the CDP was 67.16% White, 25.83% Native American, 2.95% Asian, 0.37% from other races, and 3.69% from two or more races. Hispanic or Latino of any race were 1.11% of the population.

There were 113 households, out of which 29.2% had children under the age of 18 living with them, 31.0% were married couples living together, 14.2% had a female householder with no husband present, and 46.0% were non-families. 36.3% of all households were made up of individuals, and 6.2% had someone living alone who was 65 years of age or older. The average household size was 2.40 and the average family size was 3.07.

In the CDP, the population was spread out, with 28.8% under the age of 18, 8.5% from 18 to 24, 29.9% from 25 to 44, 25.8% from 45 to 64, and 7.0% who were 65 years of age or older. The median age was 36 years. For every 100 females, there were 111.7 males. For every 100 females age 18 and over, there were 107.5 males.

The median income for a household in the CDP was $23,929, and the median income for a family was $20,139. Males had a median income of $19,722 versus $21,583 for females. The per capita income for the CDP was $13,538. None of the families and 19.1% of the population were living below the poverty line.
