= Shasta Daylight =

Former Southern Pacific Railroad passenger train

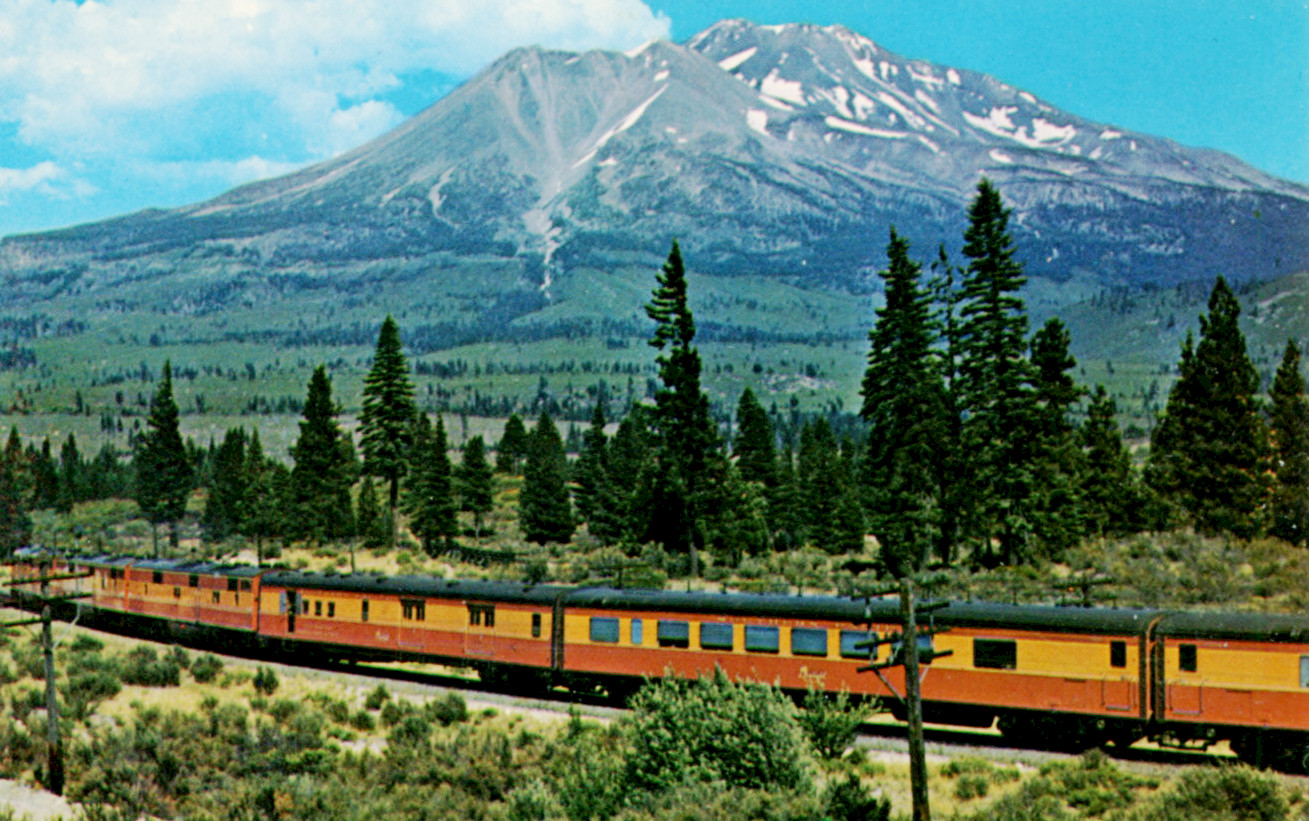
- The train west of Mount Shasta

Overview
- Service type: Inter-city rail
- Status: Discontinued
- Locale: Western United States
- First service: 1949
- Last service: 1967
- Former operator: Southern Pacific Railroad

Route
- Termini: Portland, Oregon; Oakland, California
- Distance travelled: 712 miles (1,146 km)
- Service frequency: Daily (1952)
- Train numbers: Southbound: 9 Northbound: 10

On-board services
- Seating arrangements: Chair cars
- Catering facilities: Diner; tavern-refreshment car; coffee shop car (1952)
- Observation facilities: Parlor-observation car

Technical
- Track gauge: 4 ft 8 1/2 in (1,435 mm)

The Shasta Daylight was a Southern Pacific Railroad passenger train between Oakland Pier in Oakland, California, and Portland, Oregon. It started on July 10, 1949, and was SP's third "Daylight" streamliner; it had a fast 15-hour-30-minute schedule in either direction for the 713-mile (1,147 km) trip through some of the most beautiful mountain scenery of any train in North America. The Shasta Daylight replaced heavyweight trains on the same route that had taken nearly a day and night to complete the run. The Shasta Daylight was the first diesel powered Daylight and the only Daylight to run beyond California. The scenic route of the Shasta Daylight passed its namesake Mount Shasta in daylight hours.

== History ==
=== Shasta Limited ===
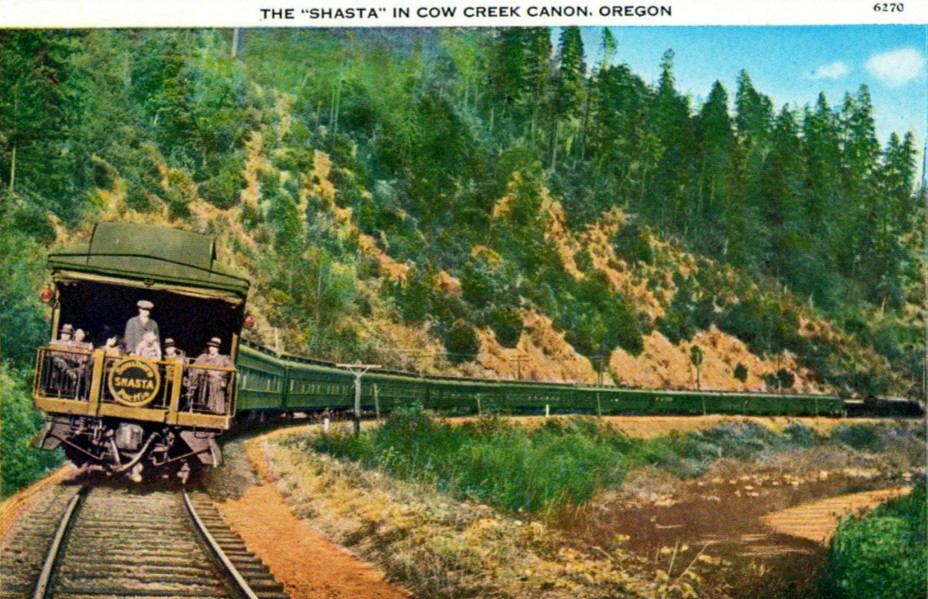
Shasta Limited in Cow Creek Canyon c. 1900-1910

The Shasta Daylight was a replacement for the Shasta Limited that had run on the Shasta Route since October 1895. The first Shasta followed the original route through the Siskiyou Mountains, via Medford, Grants Pass, and Roseburg, Oregon. This line had steep grades and sharp curves; in summer 1926 the fastest schedule Portland to San Francisco was 27 hours.

=== Shasta route upgrade ===
During the railroad's management by Edward H. Harriman, plans to upgrade the Shasta Route were unveiled. But his death and the government's attempt to break up Southern Pacific's merger with Harriman's Union Pacific, followed by an attempt to subtract the Central Pacific from the SP, delayed construction. Not until 1927 was the new Cascade Line via Willamette Pass and Klamath Falls opened as the main route between the Bay Area and the Northwest.

=== Shasta from 1931 ===
The original Shasta never operated on the new line. Starting in 1931, the train ran as its own only between Portland, Oregon, and Dunsmuir, California, south of the junction of the Siskiyou and Cascade Lines at Black Butte, California. South of Dunsmuir, the Shasta was consolidated with the Klamath. One year later the Shasta was combined with the Cascade between Eugene, Oregon, and Portland. Through service from Oakland to Portland via the Siskiyou line would end on February 13, 1938.

=== Shasta from 1946 ===
The train suspended operations during World War II but returned on August 4, 1946, as trains 327 and 328, local trains between Dunsmuir, California and Grants Pass, Oregon. The name Shasta was retained until July 10, 1949, when the Shasta Daylight began service. The local train continued unnamed (although locals nicknamed it "The Scoot") until discontinued on February 26, 1952.

=== Greyhound bus service ===
When Rogue River was discontinued four years later, all passenger service on the Siskiyou Line ended, and connecting Greyhound bus service to cities on that line were shown in the Southern Pacific timetable.

== In the presence of Mount Shasta ==
=== Advertising ===
In 1953, Southern Pacific advertised the Shasta Daylight as the "Sweetheart of the Northwest". While Portland and Seattle were served by colorful first-class transcontinental trains such as the Empire Builder on the Great Northern Railway, the North Coast Limited on the Northern Pacific Railway, and the City of Portland on the Union Pacific, no other railroad could compete against the Southern Pacific who held almost a monopoly in the Portland - Bay Area market. The bright-colored streamliner seemed to blend right in with seemingly endless evergreen forests, sky blue lakes, and ruggedly handsome mountain peaks. Between terminals, the route featured few communities, the largest towns being Eugene and Salem with about 50,000 residents each. Less than 12,000 lived in Albany and Klamath Falls, Oregon, and Redding, California. Dunsmuir and Davis only had about 5,000 people. Stops at Chemult, Oregon, and Gerber, California, had a handful of permanent residents; between were miles of barely developed landscape.

=== Descriptive writing ===
Writer and trainfan Lucius Beebe described the experience as "riding all morning in the shadowy presence of Mount Shasta, a brooding, symmetrical cone of everlasting snow that dominates the right-of-way for hundreds of miles." But there were other highlights: Shasta Lake, the Sacramento River Canyon, the Klamath Basin, and the Cascade Range. Beebe further noted, "At its terminals in Oakland and Portland are the visible and tangible evidences of urban concentration and what passes for civilization, the neon lights, the meter cabs, and the hurrying traffic of commerce and manufacture. But what lies in-between them is largely wilderness where the solitary inhabitant is likely to carry a gun in the crook of his arm and have a wild-looking dog for company."

=== Dome cars ===
Southern Pacific began rebuilding prewar cars into unique dome cars which featured both high-level seating and low-level lounge with high skylight, marketed with the romantic motto "Stairway to the Stars". These cars were effectively named '3/4 Dome Cars' by railfans, due to their odd design being similar to (but not complete) 'Full Dome Cars' seen on the Santa Fe, Great Northern and Milwaukee Road. Trains magazine editor David P. Morgan said these domes were the best in operation on any American railroad. The cars were painted in the Daylight color scheme.

== Decline ==
Donald J. Russell became President of the Southern Pacific in 1952. He was on hand to dedicate the rebuilt dome cars when they began service, but he was a bottom-line man and was aware of the popularity of automobiles and the airlines. SP's passenger revenues were dropping. Russell wanted to expand his railroad, moving into pipelines, communication, and real estate and offering faster, more efficient freight service. Seeing a trend, Russell told stockholders that the passenger train would one day disappear. "You can't make the people do what they don't want to do," he said.

=== New color scheme ===
In 1959 the Southern Pacific debuted a new color scheme for their diesel locomotives, dark gray with a red nose. It became known to fans as the "bloody nose" scheme. Shasta Daylight promotions, previously showing a Daylight-colored set of PA units, were airbrushed to black and red.

Citing low ridership during the winter, SP asked the Interstate Commerce Commission (ICC) to allow the Shasta Daylight to run tri-weekly between September 15 and December 14 and again from January 15 to May 28. The train would run daily during summer and the Christmas holiday season.

As the train rolled into the 1960s, Daylight cars were repainted in the aluminum stripe with red letterboard format used on the Sunset Limited. During this time, the train was a combination of the two color schemes plus the gray SP baggage car. The PA's were replaced with FP7 units. What could have been an opportunity for the train, the 1962 Seattle World's Fair, saw little promotion. In 1964 SP went back to the ICC and asked to discontinue the train during the winter off-season.

=== Service withdrawn ===
In summer of 1965 the Shasta Daylight was a six-to-seven car train, but going out with as few as five. The Daylight color scheme was gone. A normal consist included two FP7 locomotives in red and dark gray, a dark gray baggage car, a streamlined coach, a dome lounge, a coffee shop car, one or two additional coaches (sometimes an articulated pair), and a coach-observation. Southern Pacific asked for permission to not operate the train in 1966 but, after hearings, were ordered to provide service that summer. The train would operate sans its coach-observation, which went to the San Joaquin Daylight.

The U.S. Interstate Commerce Commission (ICC) ruling, noting the train was to operate for 1966, was to prove to be a loophole when SP announced the Shasta Daylight would not operate in the summer of 1967. The Oregon PUC protested but the remains of the Shasta Daylight now ceased operations. Russell's successor, Benjamin F. Biaggini, claimed "...the cold fact looms that the long-distance passenger train is dead and no amount of prayer or wishful thinking can bring it back to life." Labor Day 1966 saw the final runs of SP's former "sweetheart."

Chair cars from the Shasta Daylight had already been transferred to the Cascade, which became the sole passenger train on the Shasta Route. It too had been downgraded from an all-Pullman service with a triple-unit diner and would become a tri-weekly train in 1970. That it was able to survive up to the creation of Amtrak proved a savior to West Coast rail passenger service, although Mount Shasta is passed at night.

== Rolling stock ==
=== Locomotives ===
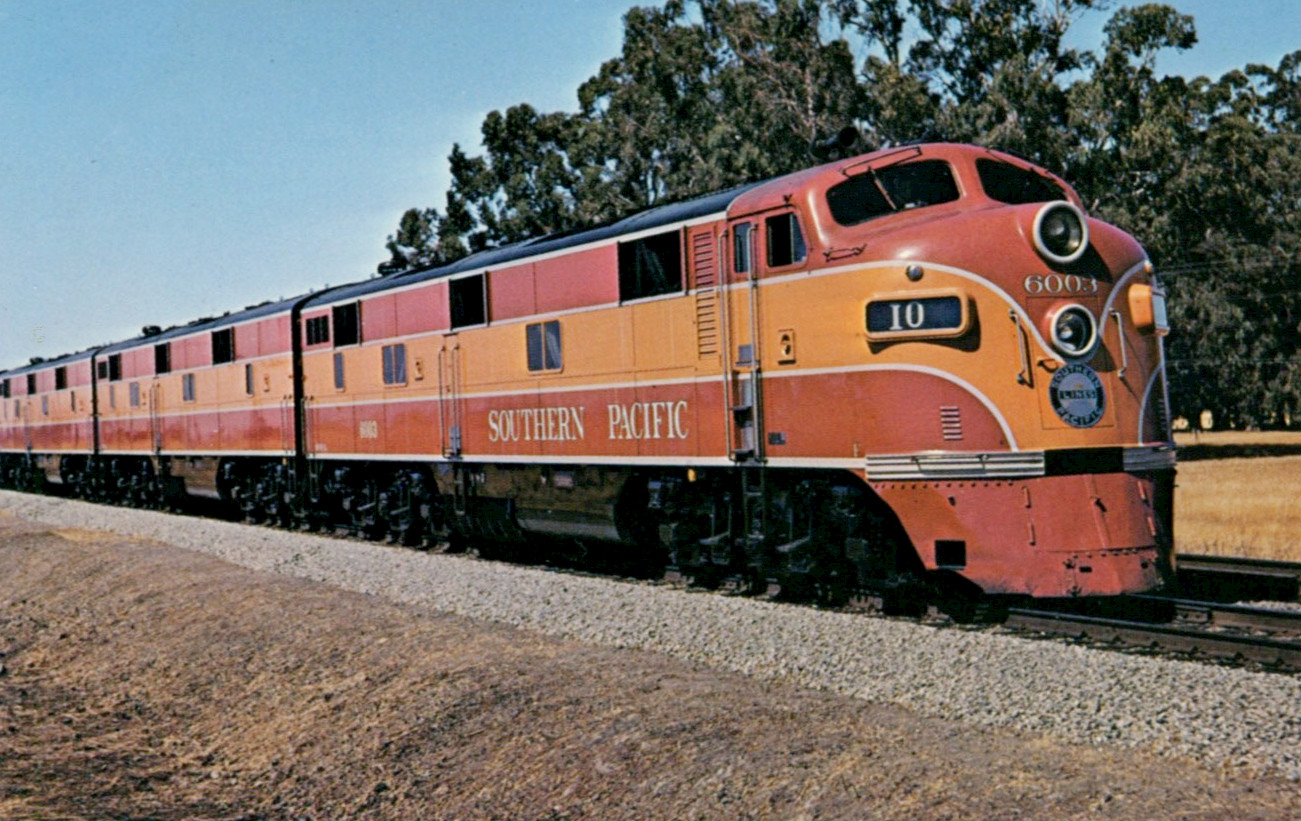
Shasta Daylight c. 1949. The train still has its EMD E7 locomotives

Initially the Shasta Daylights were assigned A-B-B sets of EMD E7 units, but within days this changed to A-B-A sets of ALCO postwar 2,000 hp PA units. The ALCO units with the same horsepower rating had dynamic braking, which the E7s lacked; with their larger traction motors the ALCO PAs were supposed to be able to outpull the E7s.

=== Passenger cars ===
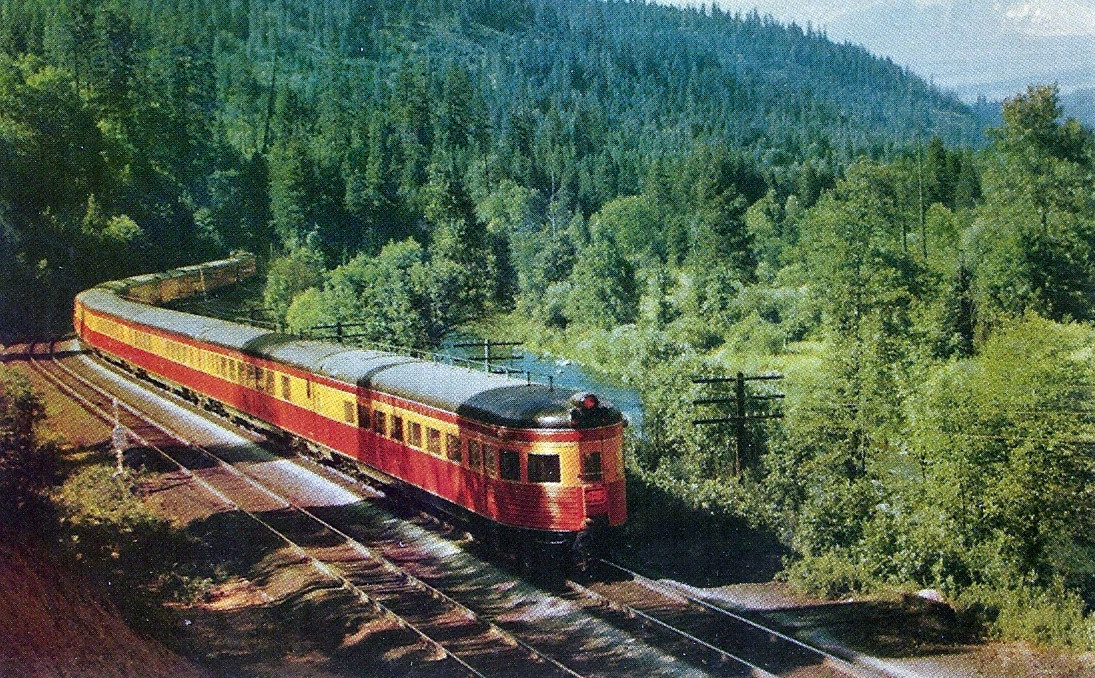
The train and its observation car in 1949

All coaches, diners, and tavern cars had larger picture windows. The cars did not have the fluted panels seen on prewar Daylights, but the two Parlor Lounge Observation cars (built in 1941 and refurbished for service on the new Shasta Daylight) retained their side fluting and their standard-sized windows. For visual unity along the train, the above-window paint stripe continued at the high-window height along these cars.

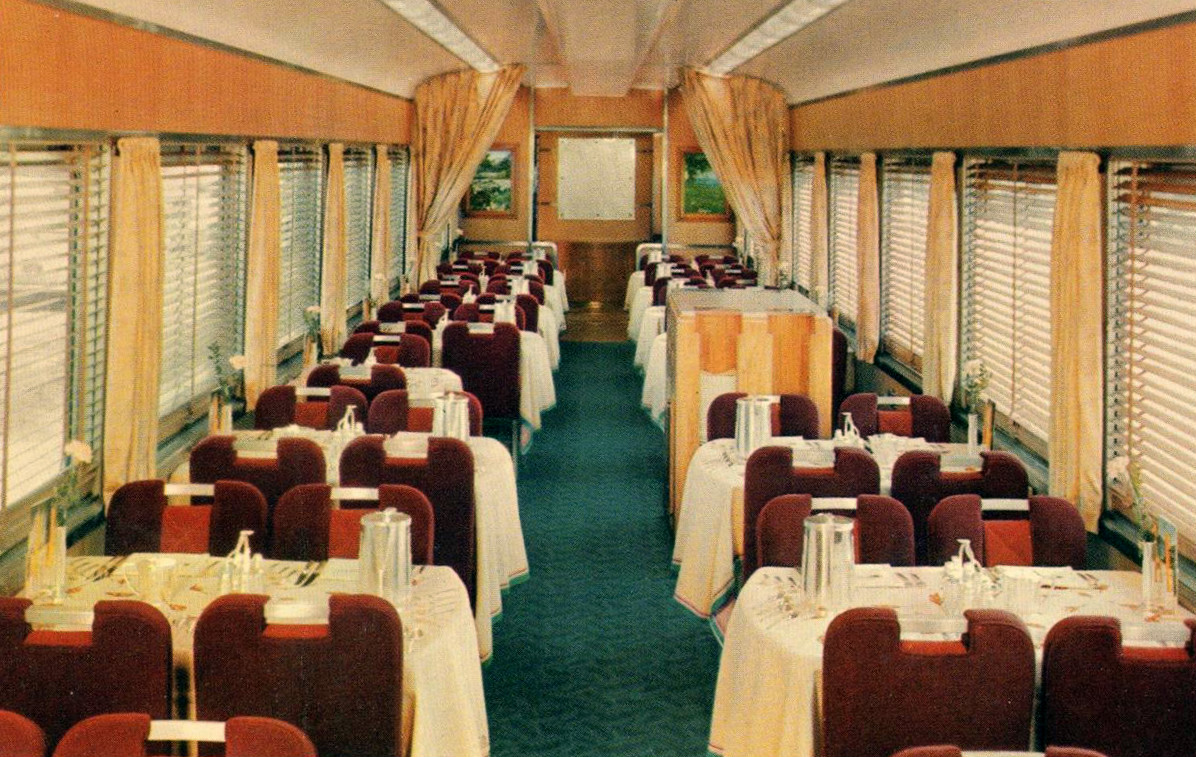
Shasta Daylight dining car

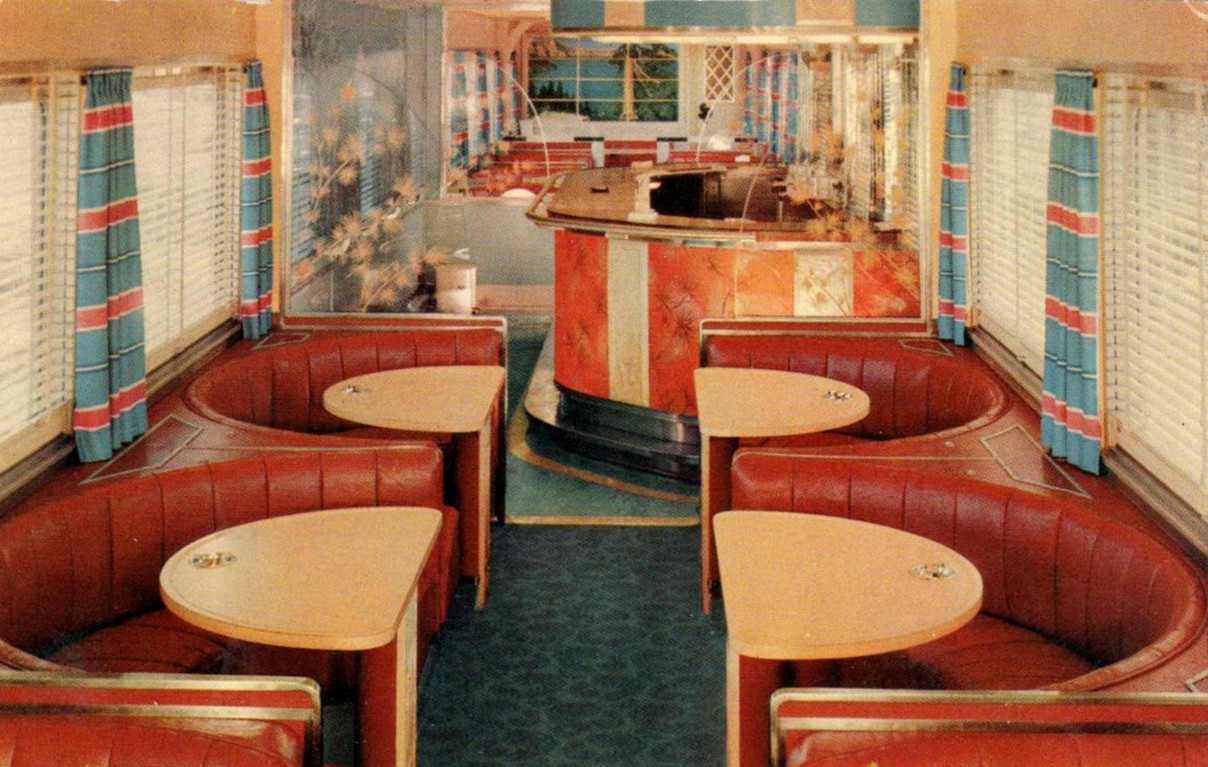
Shasta Daylight Timberline Tavern lounge car

=== First consist ===
- 6003A EMD E7A 2,000 HP Diesel Passenger Cab Unit
- 6003B EMD E7B 2,000 HP Diesel Passenger Booster Unit
- 6003C EMD E7B 2,000 HP Diesel Passenger Booster Unit
- 5000 Baggage 30’ Railway Post office Car
- 2381 46 Revenue seat Coach with News Agents Stand
- 2382 48 Revenue seat Coach
- 2383 48 Revenue seat Coach
- 2384 48 Revenue seat Coach
- 2385 38 Revenue seat Coach with Crew Day Room
- 10262 Articulated 66 seat Coffee Shop Unit
- 10263 Articulated Kitchen Unit
- 10264 Articulated 66 seat Dining Room Unit
- 2386 48 Revenue seat Coach
- 2387 48 Revenue seat Coach
- 2388 48 Revenue seat Coach
- 10316 68 seat Tavern Lounge Car
- 2389 48 Revenue seat Coach
- 2954 22 Revenue seat Parlor Lounge Observation

=== Second consist ===
- 6004A EMD E7A 2,000 HP Diesel Passenger Cab Unit
- 6004B EMD E7B 2,000 HP Diesel Passenger Booster Unit
- 6004C EMD E7B 2,000 HP Diesel Passenger Booster Unit
- 5001 Baggage 30’ Railway Post Office Car
- 2390 46 Revenue seat Coach with News Agents Stand
- 2391 48 Revenue seat Coach
- 2392 48 Revenue seat Coach
- 2393 48 Revenue seat Coach
- 2394 38 Revenue seat Coach with Crew Day Room
- 10265 Articulated 66 seat Coffee Shop Car
- 10266 Articulated Kitchen Unit
- 10267 Articulated 66 seat Dining Room Unit
- 2395 48 Revenue seat Coach
- 2396 48 Revenue seat Coach
- 2397 48 Revenue seat Coach
- 10317 68 seat Tavern Lounge Car
- 2398 48 Revenue seat Coach
- 2955 22 Revenue seat Parlor Lounge Observation

=== Surviving equipment ===
Parlor-Lounge-Observation car #2955, one of the two 1941-built cars assigned to the Shasta Daylight for its 1949 inauguration, survives today. It is owned by the Friends of SP4449, a preservation group in the Portland area, and sees occasional excursion service behind the city of Portland's two operational steam locomotives, former Southern Pacific GS-4 "Daylight" 4-8-4 #4449, and former Spokane, Portland & Seattle 4-8-4 #700. The car is still painted in the colorful "Daylight" paint scheme.

Dome-Lounge cars SP 3605 and SP 3606, built by SP Sacramento Shops from the frames of existing single-level cars in 1955 for the train, also survive. #3605 was stored at the Royal Gorge Route Railway in Colorado, awaiting restoration. It has been acquired by the Canadian Pacific Railway and renovated as an executive car; it carries the number CP 3605 and is named "Selkirk." SP 3606 is privately owned as part of a collection of former railroad cars in Rocklin, California.

== Coast Starlight ==
While the Shasta Daylight service route is still served as part of today's Coast Starlight, it is more likely to pass Mt. Shasta at night as opposed to day, however depending on schedule delays it could pass Mt. Shasta during daylight hours.

== See also ==
- Cascade
- Coast Daylight
- San Joaquin Daylight
