= Chemult station =

Train station in Chemult, Oregon, US

Chemult, OR
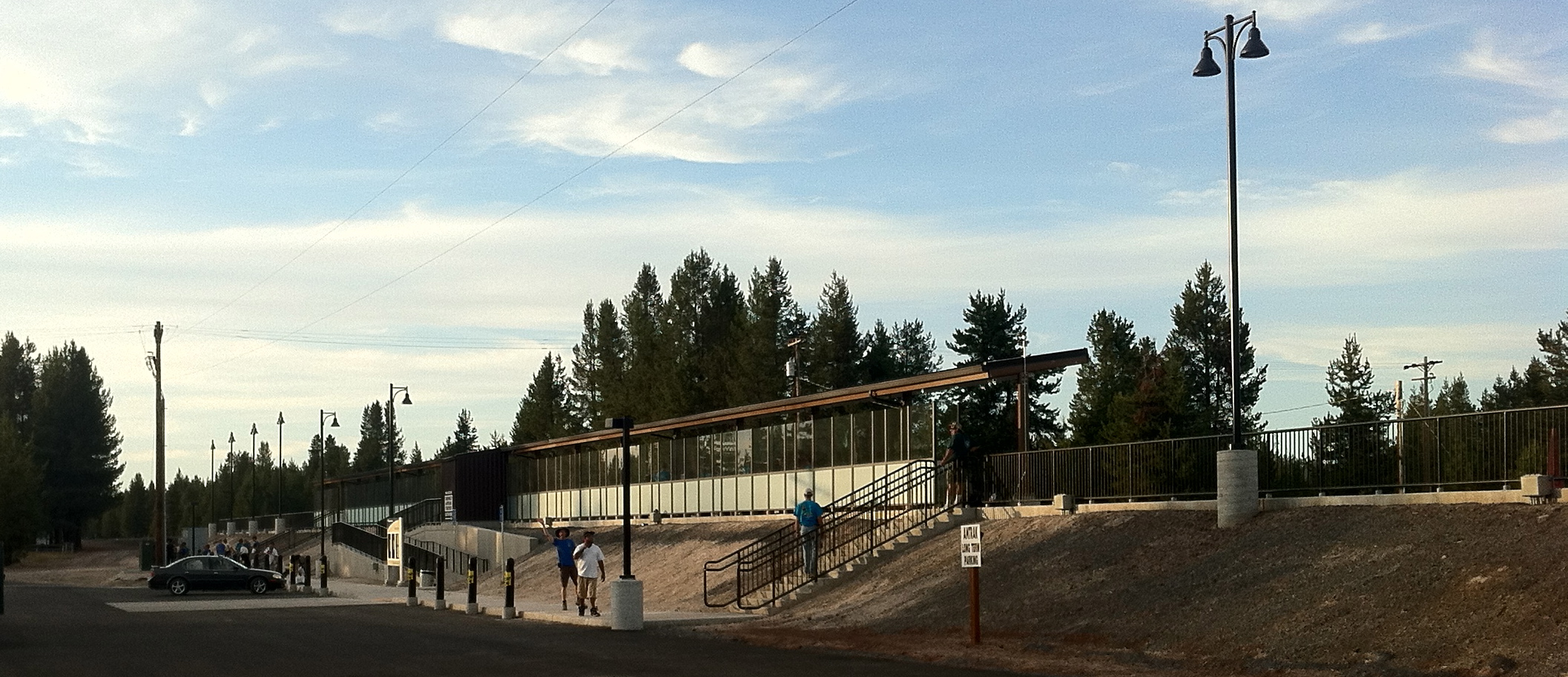
- The station shelter, August 2012

General information
- Location: Depot Street at GC Palmer Street; Chemult, Oregon
- Coordinates: 43.21665°N 121.78144°W
- Owner: Union Pacific Railroad, loaned to Amtrak
- Platforms: 1 side platform
- Tracks: 2
- Connections: Pacific Crest Bus Lines

Other information
- Station code: Amtrak: CMO

History
- Opened: October 26, 1980 (Amtrak)
- Rebuilt: 2010
- Original company: Southern Pacific

Passengers
- FY 2025: 2,610 (Amtrak)

Services
Preceding station	Amtrak	Following station
Klamath Falls toward Los Angeles	Coast Starlight	Eugene toward Seattle
Former services
Preceding station	Southern Pacific Railroad	Following station
Umli toward Oakland Pier	Shasta Route	Yamsay toward Portland
Location

Chemult station is an Amtrak train station in Chemult, Oregon. It is not staffed and only consists of a platform structure and a warming shelter, which replaced a smaller structure in 2010.

== History ==
Chemult was originally a station on the Southern Pacific Cascade Line, with regular service by the Klamath and limited service by the Cascade. The station became a stop on the Coast Starlight in 1980.

A new Chemult station was built on the site in 2010. The old structure, which was uninsulated and therefore too hot in the summer and too cold in the winter, had been the subject of much criticism for being too small. The new station cost $600,000 and was built in the Cascadian architecture style. Construction began in May 2010 and was completed in November, in time for a November 10 opening.
