= Oregon City station =

Amtrak station in Oregon, United States

Oregon City, OR
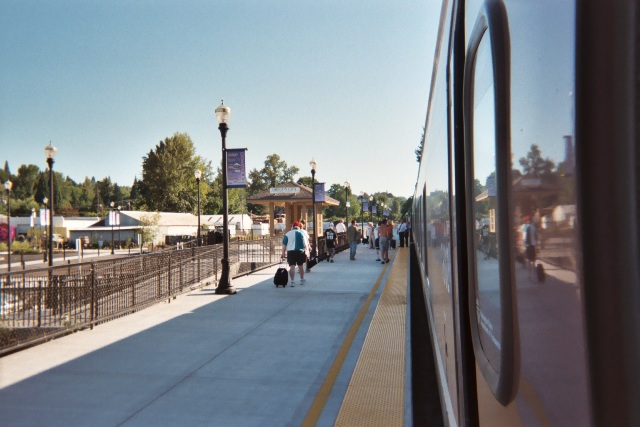
- The station soon after its opening in 2004

General information
- Location: 1757 Washington Street; Oregon City, Oregon; United States
- Coordinates: 45°21′58″N 122°35′46″W
- Owner: City of Oregon City
- Line: Union Pacific Railroad
- Platforms: 1 side platform
- Tracks: 1

Construction
- Parking: 50 long term spaces
- Accessible: Yes

Other information
- Station code: Amtrak: ORC

History
- Opened: c. 1920
- Rebuilt: April 16, 2004

Passengers
- FY 2025: 21,924 (Amtrak)

Services
Preceding station	Amtrak	Following station
Salem toward Eugene	Amtrak Cascades	Portland toward Vancouver, British Columbia
Coast Starlight does not stop here
Former services
Preceding station	Southern Pacific Railroad	Following station
Canby toward Oakland Pier	Shasta Route	East Morrison Street toward Portland
Location

Oregon City station is an Amtrak station in Oregon City, Oregon, United States. The current station consists of a platform and the city's historic Southern Pacific depot that was restored and moved to the site in 2010.

The station is served by Amtrak Cascades trains originally with two northbound departures in the morning and two southbound departures in the evening. Beginning January 6, 2014, schedules changed to one Portland-Eugene in the morning; one Portland-Eugene in the evening; one morning and one afternoon train each between Eugene and Portland. The Coast Starlight (Seattle – Los Angeles) passes through the station but does not stop.

Ridership at the Oregon City station was 9,165 in 2011. (By comparison, some 330,000 riders boarded and alighted TriMet's 16 daily WES commuter rail trains at the Beaverton Transit Center during the same period).
