= Oregonian =

Oregonian may refer to:

- Oregonians, a resident or native of the U.S. state of Oregon
- The Oregonian, the daily newspaper in Portland, Oregon, United States
- The Oregonian (film), a 2011 horror film
- USS Oregonian (ID-1323), a United States Navy cargo ship in commission from 1918 to 1919
- Oregonian (train), a Southern Pacific passenger train
