= Oregonian (train) =

Passenger train in the western United States

Overview
- Service type: Inter-city rail
- Status: Discontinued
- Locale: Northern California and Oregon
- First service: 1918
- Last service: November 14, 1946
- Former operator: Southern Pacific

Route
- Termini: Oakland, California; Portland, Oregon
- Train number: 329, 330

Technical
- Track gauge: 4 ft 8 1/2 in (1,435 mm) standard gauge

The Oregonian was a passenger train of the Southern Pacific on its route between Oakland, California, and Portland, Oregon. The Southern Pacific started the train in 1918. The Oregonian was initially given numbers 53 and 54, but was renumbered 13 and 14 from April 27, 1927, to May 1, 1931. On the latter date the Great Depression caused a reduction of service so the Oregonian was renumbered 33 and 34 running only between Portland and Ashland, Oregon. On December 11, 1932, the Oregonian was consolidated with the West Coast between Portland and Eugene, Oregon, and ran between Eugene and Ashland as train numbers 329 and 330. Trains 329 and 330 were renamed the Rogue River on June 13 1937, when the Oregonian resumed service between Portland and Oakland as train numbers 17 and 18 using equipment idled when the Cascade received new equipment. The Oregonian was discontinued on November 14 1946.
