= Beaver (train) =

Passenger train in the western United States

Overview
- Service type: Inter-city rail
- Status: Discontinued
- Locale: Northern California and Oregon
- First service: June 8, 1940
- Last service: July 10, 1949
- Successor: Shasta Daylight
- Former operator: Southern Pacific

Route
- Termini: Oakland, California; Portland, Oregon
- Stops: 15

Technical
- Track gauge: 4 ft 8 1/2 in (1,435 mm) standard gauge

The Beaver was a passenger train of the Southern Pacific on its route between Oakland, California, and Portland, Oregon. The Southern Pacific started the train on July 8, 1940, as an extra summer train offering economy tourist sleepers and coaches over the same route as the Cascade. The popularity of the train justified all-year service by September, 1940, and the train was given numbers 11 and 12 on May 11, 1941. Wartime service reductions caused the southbound Beaver to be consolidated with the Cascade as train number 23 on September 8, 1941. The northbound Beaver was similarly consolidated with the Cascade on May 3, 1943, as train number 24. The trains were separated again on August 4, 1946, with the Cascade numbered 11 and 12 and the Beaver numbered 13 and 14 until replaced by the Shasta Daylight on July 10, 1949.

== Consist ==
Post-war trains 13 and 14 typically contained the following sequence of cars.

- 1 baggage express car
- 1 news agent coach
- 4 chair cars
- 1 dining car
- 1 lounge car
- 4 tourist sleepers
