= Klamath Falls station =

Train station in Klamath Falls, Oregon, U.S.

Klamath Falls, OR
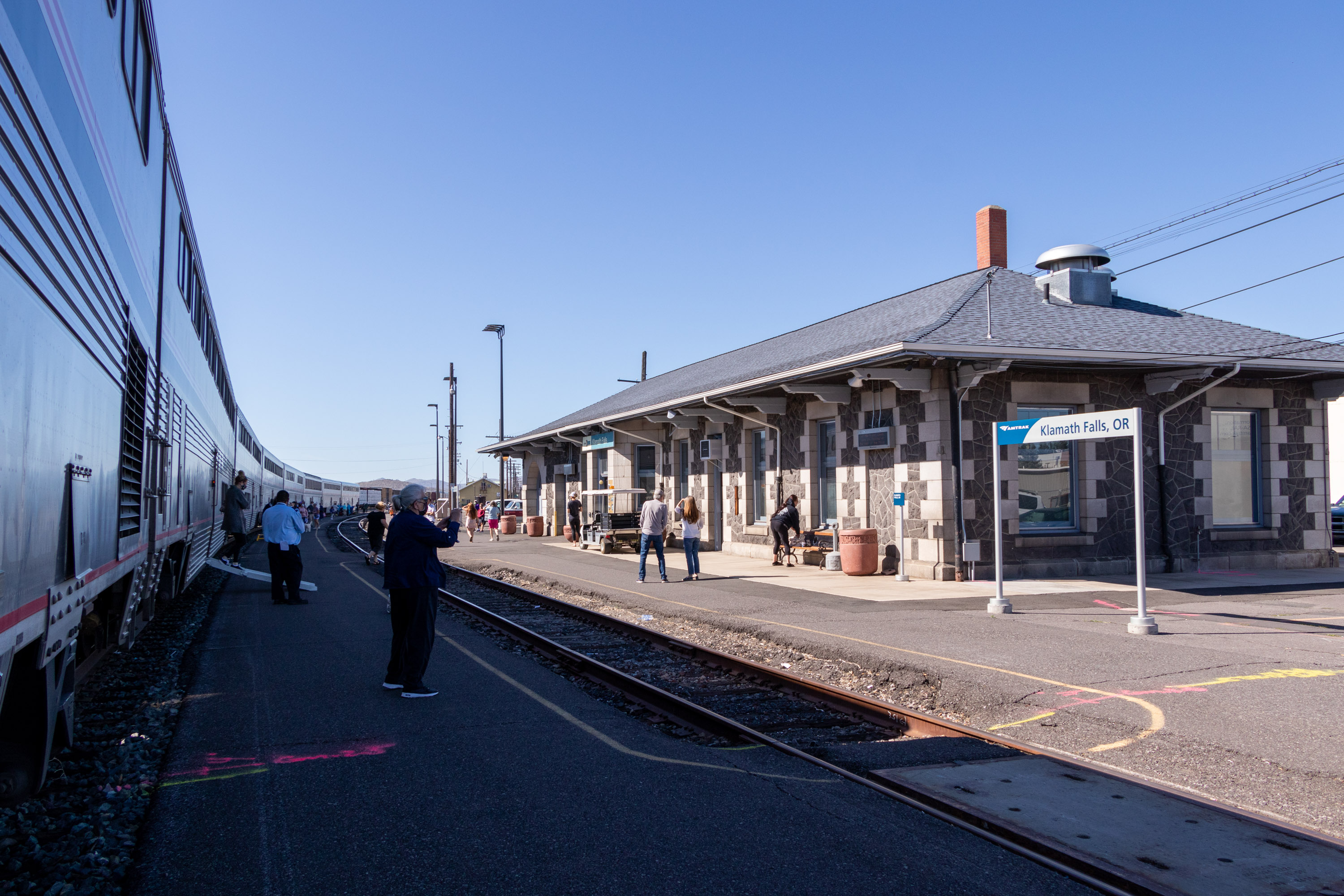
- The Coast Starlight at Klamath Falls station in June 2021

General information
- Location: 1660 Oak Avenue; Klamath Falls, Oregon
- Coordinates: 42.2255°N 121.7718°W
- Owner: Union Pacific Railroad, loaned to Amtrak
- Platforms: 1 side platform, 1 island platform
- Tracks: 2
- Connections: POINT, Basin Transit Service, Crater Lake Trolley, Pacific Crest Bus Lines, Sage Stage

Other information
- Station code: Amtrak: KFS

History
- Opened: May 20, 1909

Passengers
- FY 2025: 26,103 (Amtrak)

Services
Preceding station	Amtrak	Following station
Dunsmuir toward Los Angeles	Coast Starlight	Chemult toward Seattle
Former services
Preceding station	Southern Pacific Railroad	Following station
Dorris toward Oakland Pier	Shasta Route	Algoma toward Portland
Location

Klamath Falls station is a train station in Klamath Falls, Oregon, served by Amtrak's Coast Starlight. Located at 1600 Oak Avenue, the station building has a waiting room with a ticket agent. Klamath Falls is the southernmost station in Oregon. Via bus connections, it serves a large swath of southwestern Oregon, including Medford.

The Klamath Falls depot was built in 1916 for the Southern Pacific Railroad. It is composed of dark grey random ashlar walls with staggered light stone trim highlighting the windows and doors. A hipped roof with deep eaves supported by brackets protects passengers from inclement weather. Renovations that took place in 1999–2000 focused on the restrooms, ticket counter and entryways; new carpet and cabinets were also installed.
