= West Coast (train) =

Former passenger service of the Southern Pacific Railroad, USA

Overview
- Status: Discontinued
- Locale: Western United States
- First service: 1927
- Last service: 1960
- Former operator: Southern Pacific Railroad

Route
- Termini: Los Angeles, California; Portland, Oregon

Technical
- Track gauge: 4 ft 8 1/2 in (1,435 mm) standard gauge

The West Coast was a named train of the Southern Pacific Railroad from Los Angeles to Portland via the San Joaquin Valley. It had through car service to Seattle via the Great Northern Railway. Unlike the West Coast, Amtrak's Coast Starlight takes the Coast Line through San Luis Obispo and Oakland; no Southern Pacific passenger train was ever scheduled to run from Los Angeles to Portland via Oakland.

The first through train from Los Angeles to Portland started in 1924 and was named West Coast in 1927, by which time it was on the Cascade Line via Klamath Falls. In California it sometimes ran on the West Valley via Orland and Davis and sometimes on the East Valley via Marysville and Roseville. It was always an overnight train between Sacramento and Los Angeles; in 1932-36 it was combined with the Owl south of Fresno.

The train was discontinued north of Sacramento in 1949 in favor of the Shasta Daylight and Cascade. The last section of the West Coast between Los Angeles and Sacramento continued to operate until December 1960, when it was permanently discontinued.
