= Albany station (Oregon) =

Train station in Albany, Oregon, USA

Albany, OR
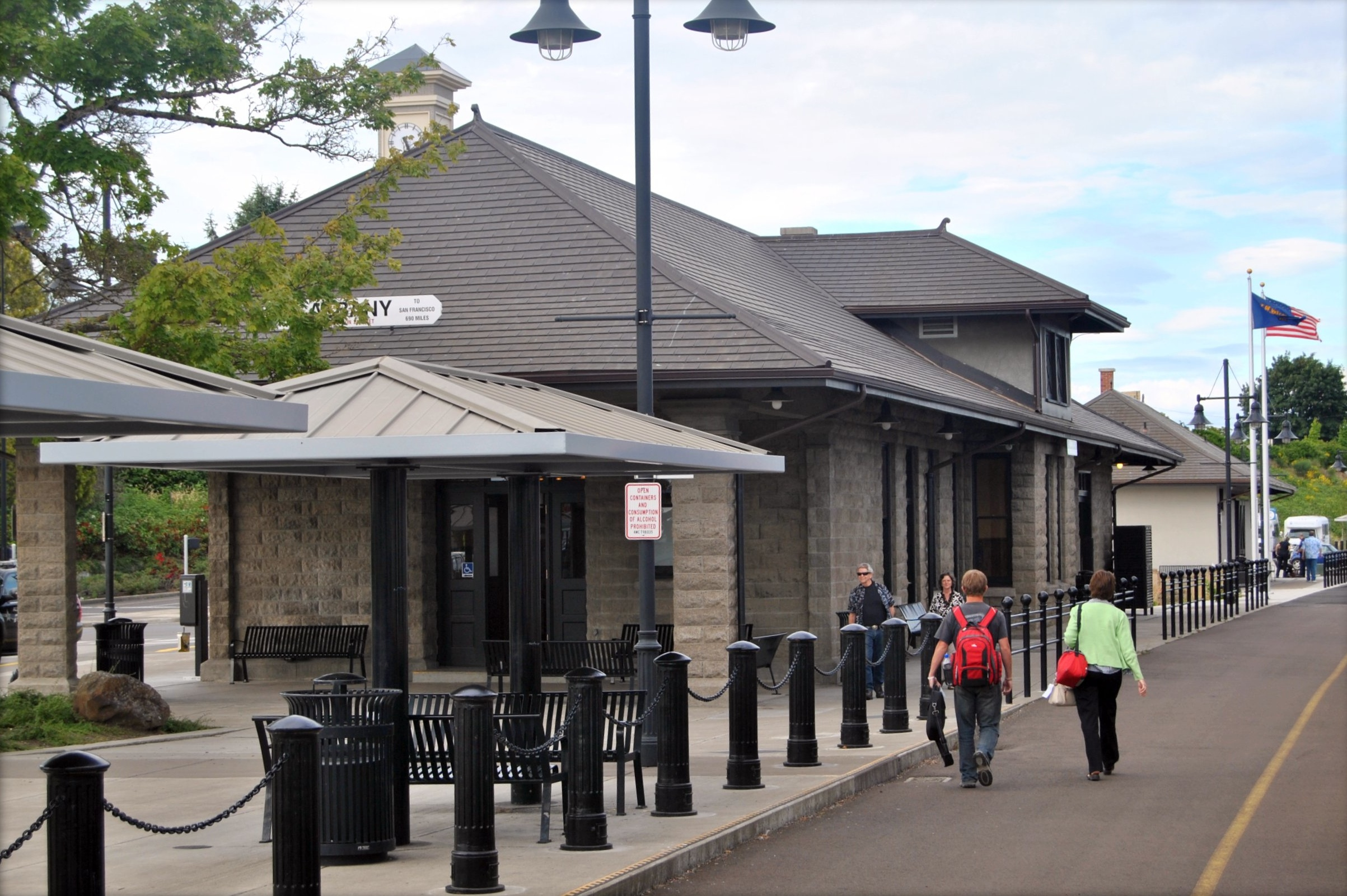

General information
- Location: 110 10th Avenue; Albany, Oregon; United States
- Coordinates: 44°37′49″N 123°06′09″W
- Owner: City of Albany
- Line: Union Pacific Railroad
- Platforms: 1 side platform
- Tracks: 1
- Connections: Albany Transit System; Benton Area Transit; Linn-Benton Loop; Linn Shuttle; POINT

Construction
- Accessible: Yes

Other information
- Station code: Amtrak: ALY

History
- Opened: 1909; October 30, 1977
- Closed: April 30, 1971

Passengers
- FY 2025: 46,161 (Amtrak)

Services
Preceding station	Amtrak	Following station
Eugene Terminus	Amtrak Cascades	Salem toward Vancouver, British Columbia
Eugene toward Los Angeles	Coast Starlight	Salem toward Seattle
Former services
Preceding station	Southern Pacific Railroad	Following station
Tangent toward Oakland Pier	Shasta Route	Jefferson toward Portland
Location

Albany station is an Amtrak intercity rail station in Albany, Oregon, United States. It is served by the Amtrak Cascades and the Coast Starlight passenger trains, and is the westernmost Amtrak station. Albany station also serves as the hub for local transit.

== History ==
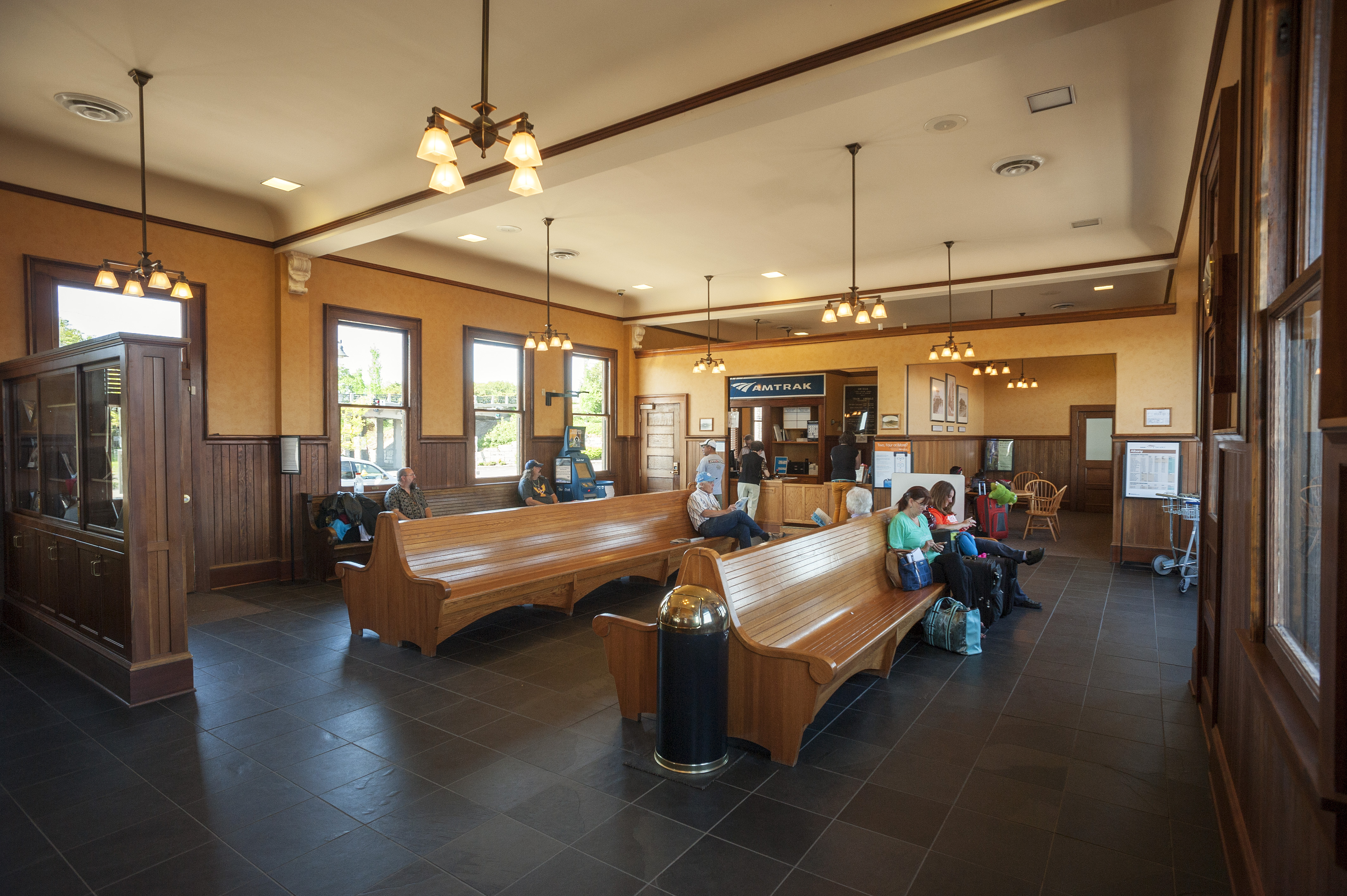
Interior of the station

The station was constructed in 1909 for the Southern Pacific Railroad and is built of masonry. It was built on the site of an earlier railroad station constructed by the Oregon and California Railroad in 1870. When Amtrak took over intercity passenger service in May 1971, Albany was dropped as a stop, though a Los Angeles–Seattle train (later the Coast Starlight) was run. Albany was added as a stop on the Coast Starlight on October 30, 1977.

Beginning in 2004, the station and the surrounding area underwent an $11.3 million restoration that was funded with a combination of federal, state, local, and Amtrak money. The Oregon Department of Transportation was in charge of the project. The station was rededicated on April 18, 2006. The City of Albany also restored the former Railway Express Agency building nearby as offices for the city's transit system.
