= Springfield station (Oregon) =

- Southern Pacific Railroad Passenger Station and Freight House
- U.S. National Register of Historic Places
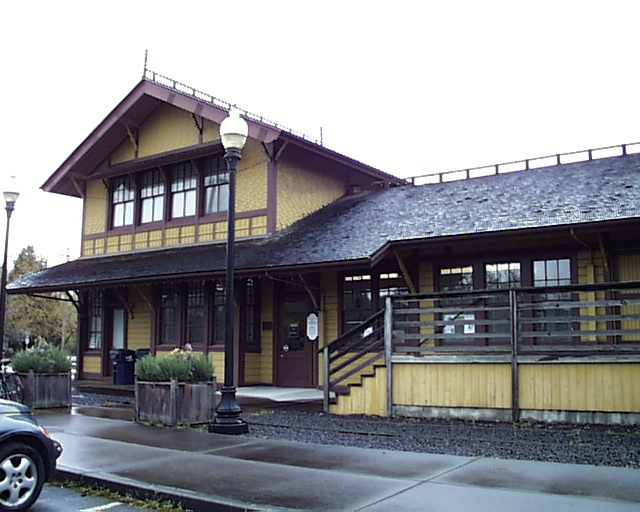
- The building's exterior in 2007

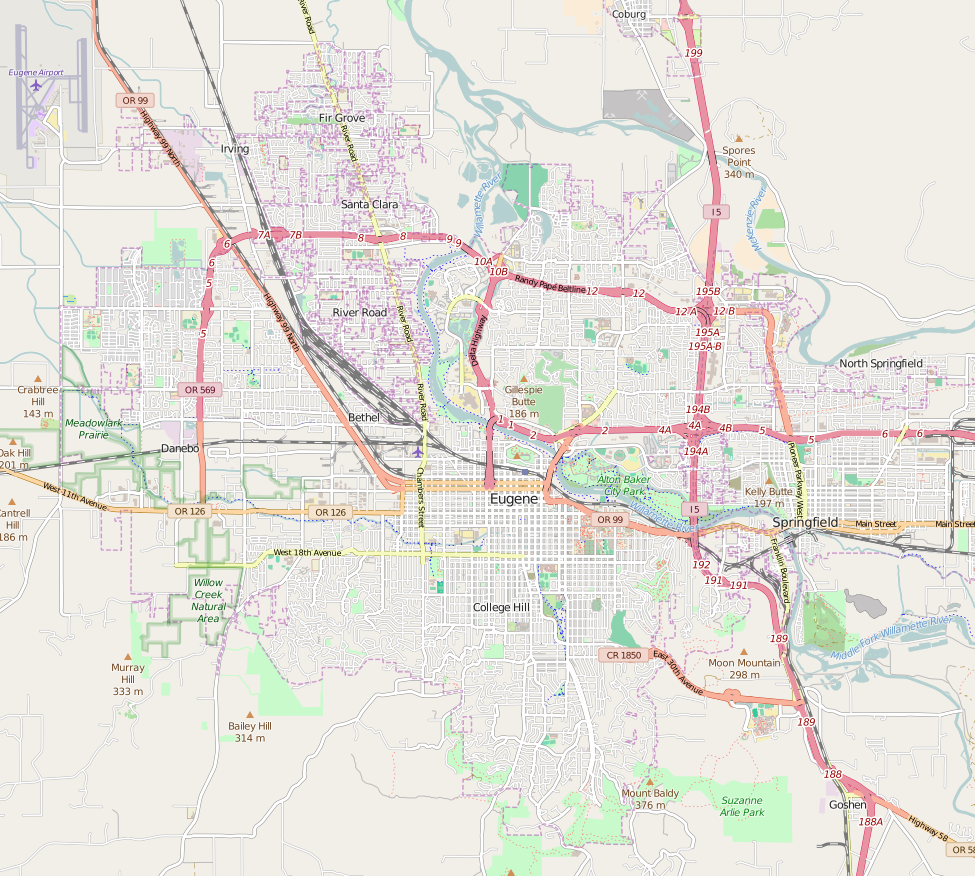
- Location within Eugene OR Location within Oregon
- Location: 101 South A Street, Springfield, Oregon
- Coordinates: 44°2′41″N 123°0′56″W
- Area: 0.2 acres (0.081 ha)
- Built: 1891
- Built by: Southern Pacific Co.
- Architectural style: Stick/eastlake
- NRHP reference No.: 82005088
- Added to NRHP: February 24, 1993

The Southern Pacific Railroad Passenger Station and Freight House, located in Springfield, Oregon, United States, is listed on the National Register of Historic Places.

== See also ==
- National Register of Historic Places listings in Lane County, Oregon
- Goleta Depot, in Goleta, California, a similar two-story depot

Preceding station	Southern Pacific Railroad	Following station
Lowell toward Oakland Pier	Shasta Route	Eugene toward Portland
