= Salem station (Oregon) =

Amtrak train station in Salem, Oregon

Salem, OR
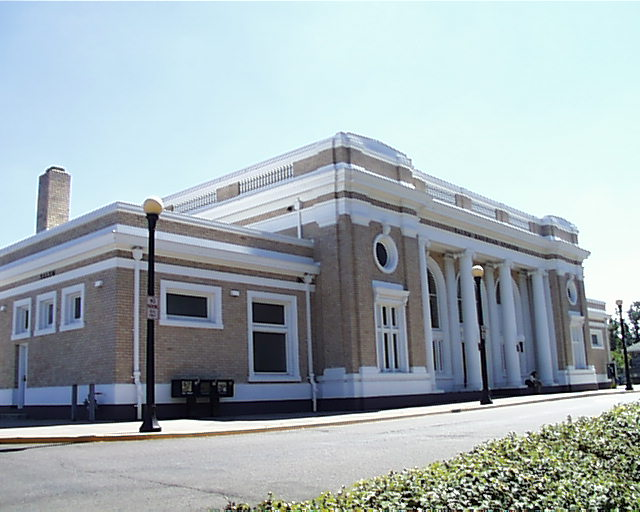

General information
- Location: 500 13th Street SE; Salem, Oregon; United States
- Coordinates: 44°55′56″N 123°01′41″W
- Owner: State of Oregon
- Line: Union Pacific Railroad
- Platforms: 1 side platform
- Tracks: 1
- Connections: Cascades POINT; Cherriots; Greyhound Lines; Pacific Crest Bus Lines

Construction
- Parking: 25 long term spaces
- Cycle facilities: Yes
- Accessible: Yes

Other information
- Station code: Amtrak: SLM

History
- Opened: 1918; 108 years ago
- Rebuilt: 2000; 26 years ago

Passengers
- FY 2025: 59,735 (Amtrak)

Services
| Preceding station | Amtrak | Following station |
|---|---|---|
| Albany toward Eugene | Amtrak Cascades | Oregon City toward Vancouver, British Columbia |
| Albany toward Los Angeles | Coast Starlight | Portland toward Seattle |
Former services
| Preceding station | Southern Pacific Railroad | Following station |
|---|---|---|
| Turner toward Oakland Pier | Shasta Route | Chemawa toward Portland |
- Salem Southern Pacific Railroad Station
- U.S. National Register of Historic Places
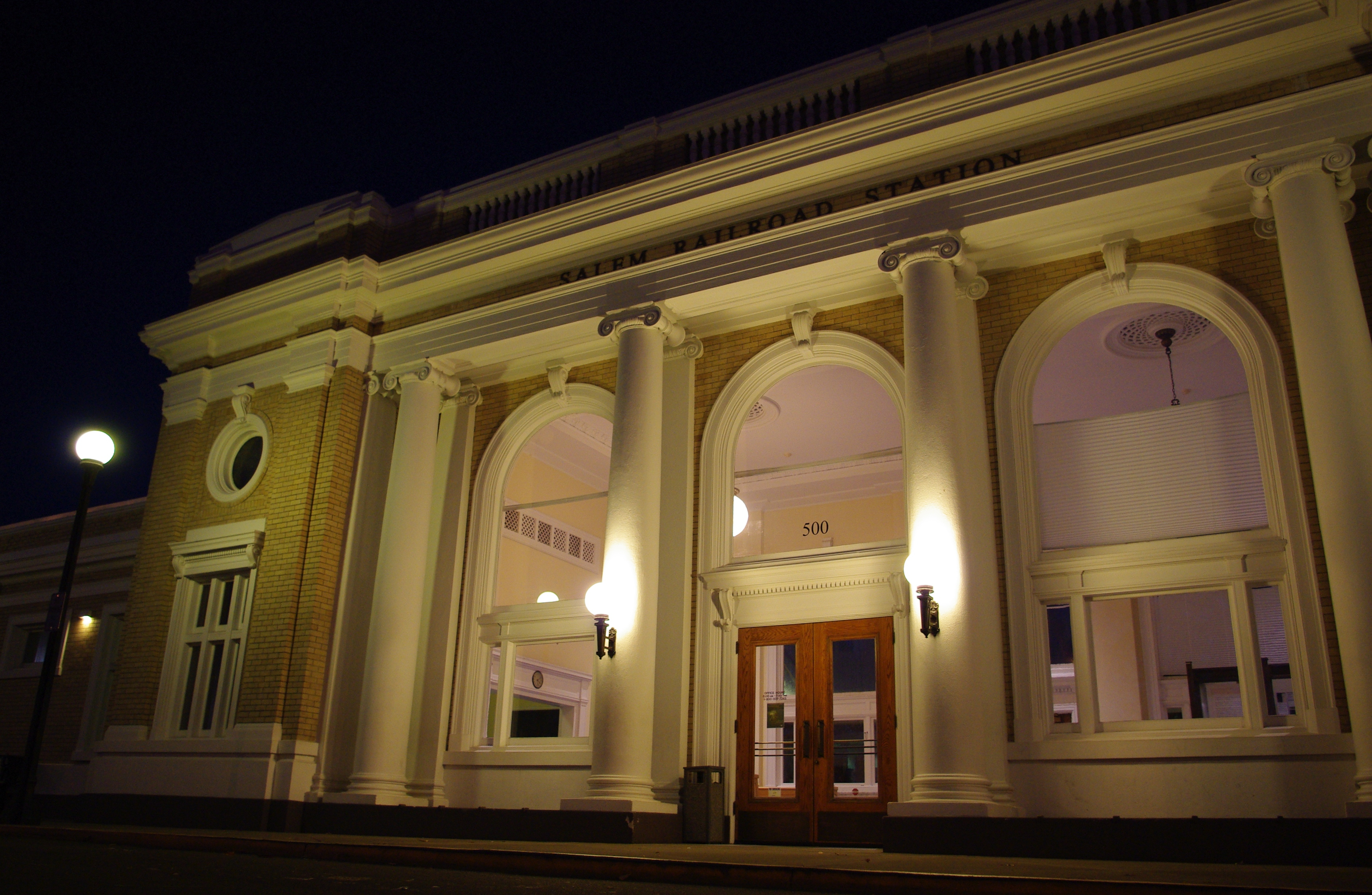
- A close up picture at night.
- Area: 2.7 acres (1.1 ha)
- Built: 1918
- Architects: Christie, J.H.; Stebinger Bros.
- Architectural style: Queen Anne, Beaux-Arts
- NRHP reference No.: 10000015
- Added to NRHP: February 12, 2010
Location

Salem station is an Amtrak train station in Salem, Oregon, United States. It is served by Amtrak Cascades corridor trains going to and from Portland, Oregon, as well as the long-distance Coast Starlight. Greyhound Lines and some regional buses also stop at the station.

== History ==
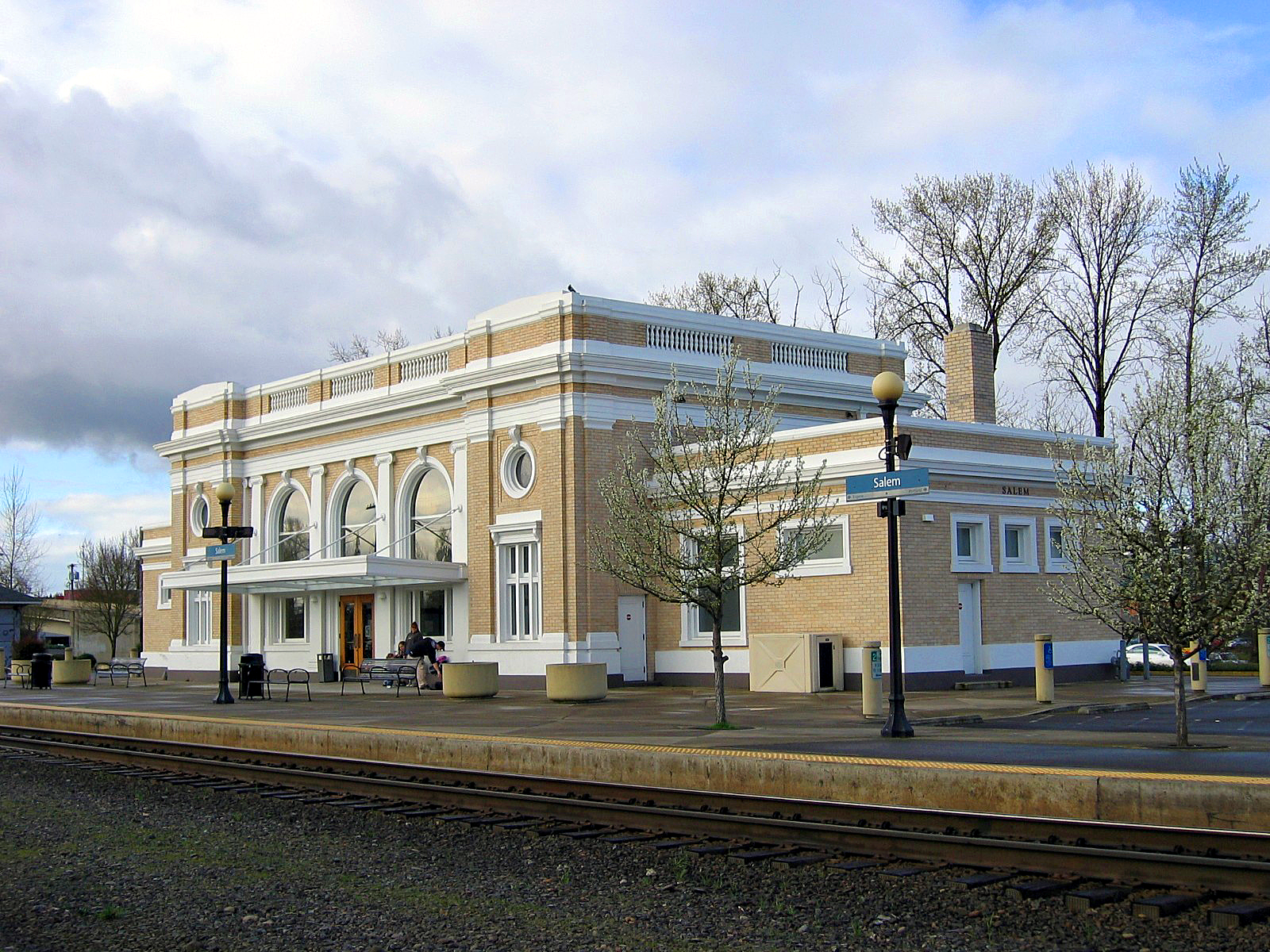
Trackside of Salem Depot

This station was constructed for the Southern Pacific Railroad in 1918 and is the third station to be built at this location. The two previous stations were built in 1871 and 1889. The 1871 depot burned down in 1885. It is commonly believed that the Queen Anne style 1889 depot burned down on March 5, 1917, but newspaper reports from the time say it was unsightly and, except for the baggage wing, demolished.

The current Beaux-Arts-style structure was designed by Southern Pacific's chief architect John H. Christie. It is constructed of masonry, and is one of five masonry depots that still exist along the original Southern Pacific West Coast line. The other depots are in Albany, Medford, Roseburg and Eugene.

A restoration project by the Oregon Department of Transportation (ODOT) was completed in 2000. Amtrak leases the station from ODOT for $1 a year, in exchange for maintenance of the building and grounds.

An 1889 Railway Express Agency (REA) freight depot/baggage shed from the previous station was kept and is the oldest freight depot still in existence in the state. Either after the 1917 fire or in preparation for constructing the new depot, the Queen Anne-style REA depot was relocated from its original site to the south. The REA depot had not been used since the mid-1970s, but ODOT restored it in the late 2000s for use by Greyhound.

The station and baggage depot were added to the National Register of Historic Places on February 12, 2010. In 2011, daily ridership on Amtrak between Salem and Portland reached 24,146 boardings.

Greyhound Lines moved operations from its downtown station to here in 2013, first to the north wing of the station building and, upon completion of renovations in 2018, to the former freight shed.
