= Chemult, Oregon =

Census-designated place in Oregon, United States

- Unincorporated community
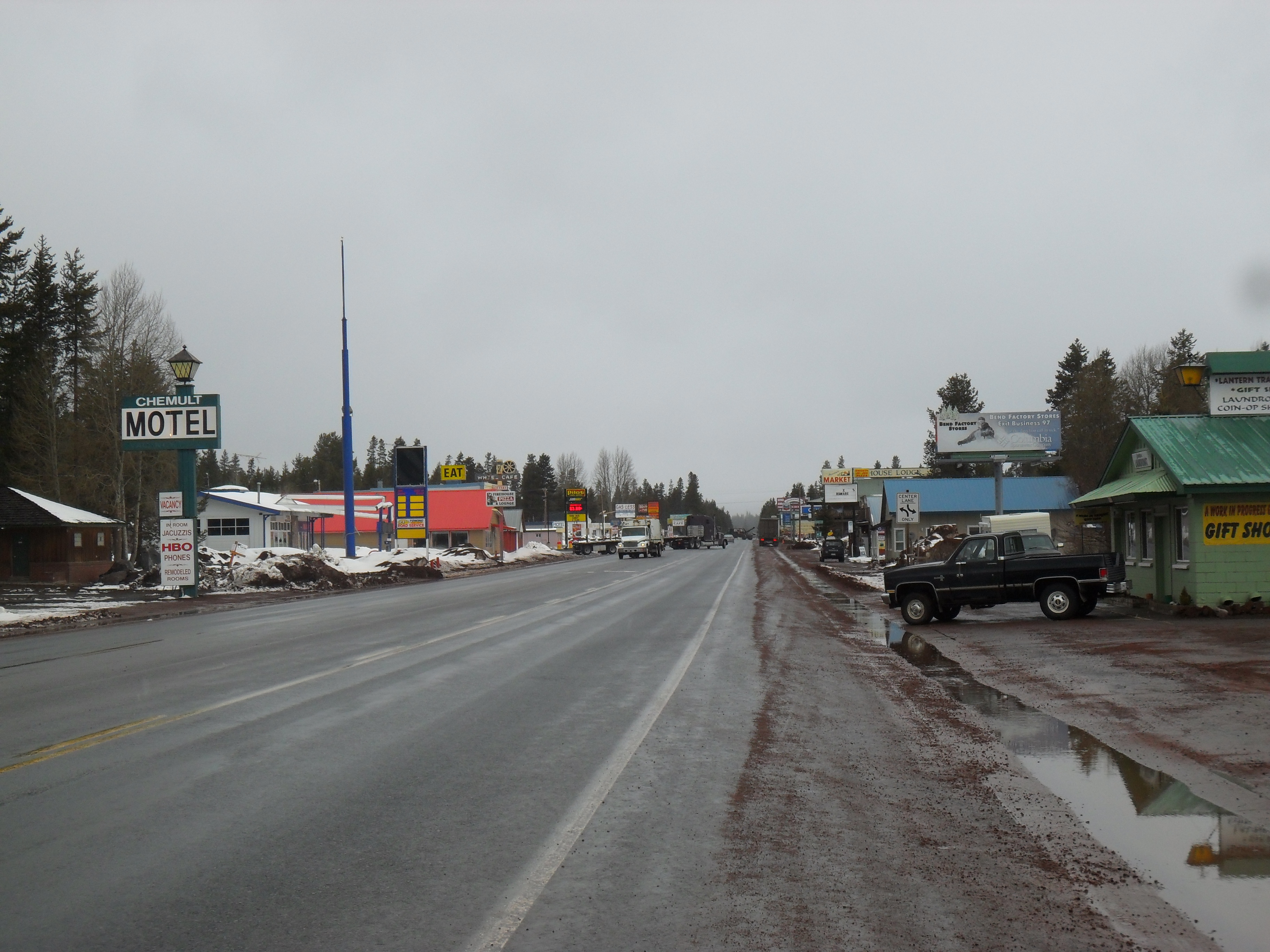
- U.S. Route 97 into Chemult

- Location within the state of Oregon Chemult (the United States)
- Coordinates: 43°12′54″N 121°47′06″W
- Country: United States
- State: Oregon
- County: Klamath

Area
  - Total: 0.26 sq mi (0.67 km^{2})
  - Land: 0.26 sq mi (0.67 km^{2})
  - Water: 0 sq mi (0.00 km^{2})
- Elevation: 4,764 ft (1,452 m)
  - Density: 306.2/sq mi (118.2/km^{2})
- Time zone: UTC−8 (Pacific (PST))
  - Summer (DST): UTC−7 (PDT)
- ZIP code: 97731
- Area codes: 458 and 541
- FIPS code: 41-12750
- GNIS feature ID: 2805448

Chemult /ʃɛˈmoʊlt/ is an unincorporated community and census-designated place in Klamath County, Oregon, United States, on U.S. Route 97 near the drainage divide between the Klamath and Columbia Rivers. As of the 2020 census, Chemult had a population of 79. Chemult's elevation is 4,764 feet (1,452 m).

The locale was originally established in 1924 as a station on the Southern Pacific Cascade Line named "Knott" during construction. The station's name was changed to Chemult when the line opened in 1926 and a post office was established the same year. The name Chemult comes from a Klamath chief who was one of the 26 who signed the Klamath Lake Treaty of October 14, 1864.

Amtrak's Coast Starlight stops in Chemult daily at the Chemult Amtrak station, and Pacific Crest Bus Lines stops daily at the station on its route from Klamath Falls to Bend. There is also a Winema National Forest ranger station within the community.

== Demographics ==
Historical population
Census	Pop.	Note	%±
2020	79		—
U.S. Decennial Census

== Climate ==
Chemult has the typical continental Mediterranean climate (Köppen Dsb) of the more humid parts of the Intermountain West, featuring dry summers with large diurnal temperature swings and cold winters with cycles of heavy snowfall and dry spells. Owing to being closer to the Sierra-Cascade crest, however, Chemult is one of the snowiest inhabited places in the contiguous US, with a thirty-year average of 109.4 inches (278 cm), and it also has among the highest frequency of nights below 32 °F (0 °C), with an average of 257.6 nights each year falling below this temperature, including 13.4 in the summer months of July and August when days can skyrocket to 86 °F (30 °C) or higher. Typically 17.6 days will fail to hit 32 °F (0 °C) and 8.4 nights fall below 0 °F (−17.8 °C), whilst in December and January only 3.2 days exceed 50 °F (10 °C).

Since records began in 1937 the wettest calendar year has been 1996 with at least 42.40 inches (1,077.0 mm) (several days were missing) whilst the driest has been 1994 with 11.28 inches (286.5 mm), though between July 1976 and June 1977 only 11.76 inches (298.7 mm) fell. The wettest month has been December 1996 with 15.25 inches (387.3 mm), whilst the highest monthly snowfall has been 115.0 inches (2.92 m) in January 1954 and the highest for a season 274.0 inches (6.96 m) from July 1955 to June 1956. The average maximum snow depth is 36 inches (0.91 m), but has been as high as 90 inches (2.29 m) on January 4, 1966 after 83 inches (2.11 m) fell the previous December.

Climate data for Chemult, Oregon, 1991–2020 normals, extremes 1937–2018
Month	Jan	Feb	Mar	Apr	May	Jun	Jul	Aug	Sep	Oct	Nov	Dec	Year
Record high °F (°C)	62 (17)	65 (18)	75 (24)	85 (29)	94 (34)	98 (37)	103 (39)	102 (39)	100 (38)	90 (32)	75 (24)	63 (17)	103 (39)
Mean maximum °F (°C)	49.7 (9.8)	54.0 (12.2)	63.0 (17.2)	74.1 (23.4)	82.5 (28.1)	89.1 (31.7)	94.4 (34.7)	94.6 (34.8)	89.2 (31.8)	80.0 (26.7)	59.9 (15.5)	50.1 (10.1)	96.6 (35.9)
Mean daily maximum °F (°C)	37.4 (3.0)	41.0 (5.0)	46.8 (8.2)	52.8 (11.6)	63.2 (17.3)	71.7 (22.1)	82.9 (28.3)	81.7 (27.6)	75.5 (24.2)	60.6 (15.9)	43.5 (6.4)	35.9 (2.2)	57.8 (14.3)
Daily mean °F (°C)	26.3 (−3.2)	29.1 (−1.6)	34.0 (1.1)	38.6 (3.7)	46.6 (8.1)	52.8 (11.6)	60.7 (15.9)	59.2 (15.1)	52.8 (11.6)	42.4 (5.8)	32.3 (0.2)	25.5 (−3.6)	41.7 (5.4)
Mean daily minimum °F (°C)	15.3 (−9.3)	17.3 (−8.2)	21.3 (−5.9)	24.3 (−4.3)	30.1 (−1.1)	34.0 (1.1)	38.6 (3.7)	36.7 (2.6)	30.1 (−1.1)	24.2 (−4.3)	21.1 (−6.1)	15.2 (−9.3)	25.7 (−3.5)
Mean minimum °F (°C)	−1.9 (−18.8)	−1.3 (−18.5)	4.2 (−15.4)	13.5 (−10.3)	17.7 (−7.9)	23.5 (−4.7)	27.6 (−2.4)	26.3 (−3.2)	19.6 (−6.9)	12.8 (−10.7)	3.4 (−15.9)	−5.9 (−21.1)	−10.9 (−23.8)
Record low °F (°C)	−30 (−34)	−27 (−33)	−15 (−26)	0 (−18)	10 (−12)	17 (−8)	20 (−7)	14 (−10)	9 (−13)	−3 (−19)	−26 (−32)	−30 (−34)	−30 (−34)
Average precipitation inches (mm)	4.59 (117)	3.25 (83)	2.73 (69)	1.57 (40)	1.49 (38)	1.26 (32)	0.47 (12)	0.64 (16)	0.53 (13)	1.58 (40)	3.16 (80)	5.26 (134)	26.53 (674)
Average snowfall inches (cm)	23.6 (60)	20.3 (52)	9.2 (23)	3.7 (9.4)	0.5 (1.3)	0.1 (0.25)	0.0 (0.0)	0.0 (0.0)	0.0 (0.0)	0.9 (2.3)	16.5 (42)	34.6 (88)	109.4 (278.25)
Average precipitation days (≥ 0.01 in)	12.6	10.3	10.9	9.5	8.9	5.2	2.3	2.7	2.6	6.4	11.9	13.9	97.2
Average snowy days (≥ 0.1 in)	8.6	7.5	5.4	2.7	0.4	0.0	0.0	0.0	0.0	0.5	5.8	10.4	41.3
Source 1: NOAA
Source 2: National Weather Service (mean maxima/minima, snow/snow days 1981–2010)

== Education ==
It is within the Klamath County School District.
