= Eugene station (Amtrak) =

Train station in Eugene, Oregon, United States

Eugene
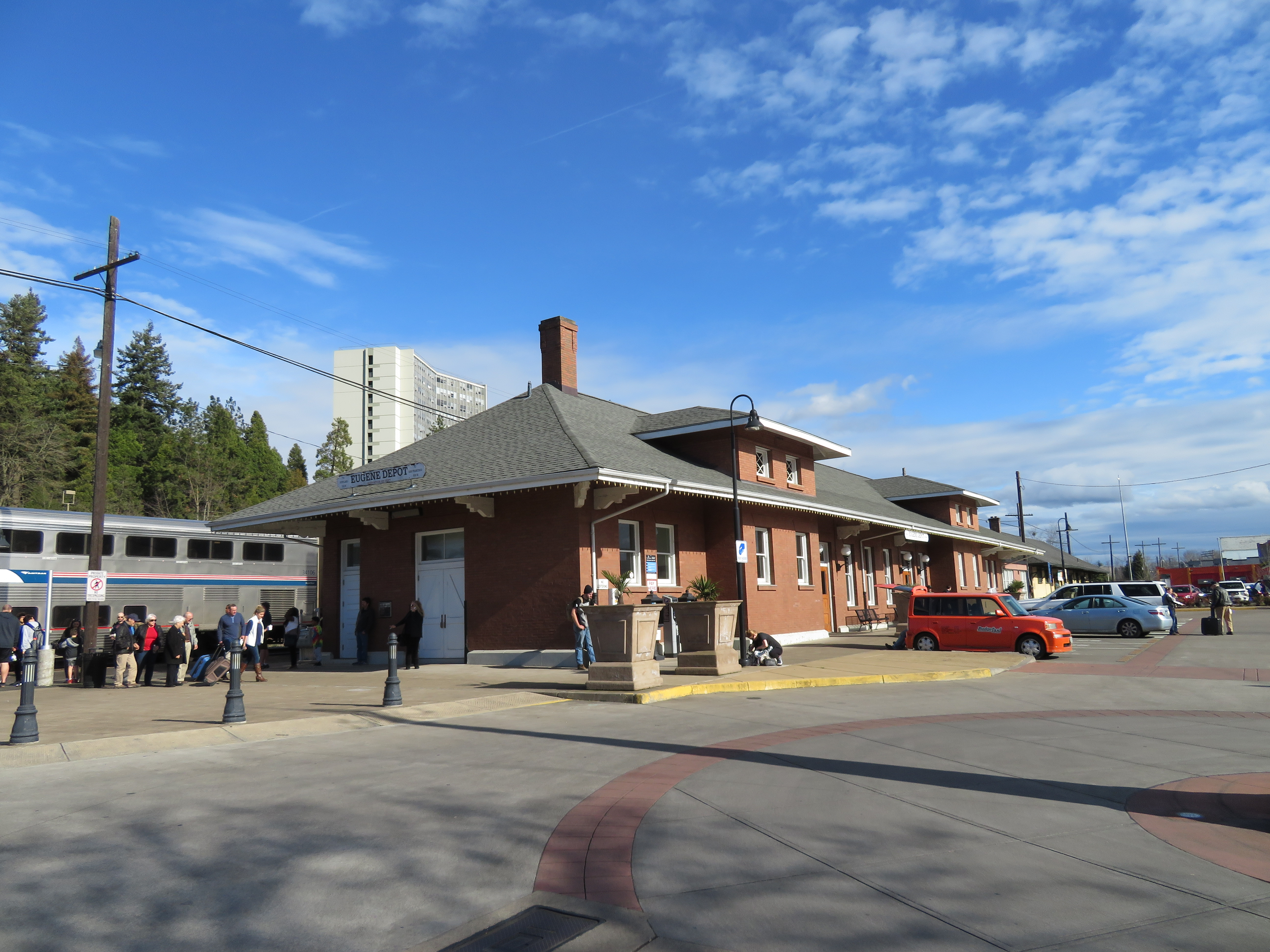
- Eugene station with the Coast Starlight in 2018

General information
- Location: 433 Willamette Street; Eugene, Oregon; United States
- Coordinates: 44°03′19″N 123°05′32″W
- Owner: City of Eugene
- Line: Union Pacific Railroad
- Platforms: 1 side platform
- Tracks: 2
- Connections: Lane Transit District; LinkLane; Pacific Crest Bus Lines; POINT

Construction
- Accessible: Yes

Other information
- Station code: Amtrak: EUG

History
- Opened: 1908; 118 years ago
- Rebuilt: 2004; 22 years ago

Passengers
- FY 2025: 120,102 (Amtrak)

Services
Preceding station	Amtrak	Following station
Terminus	Amtrak Cascades	Albany toward Vancouver, British Columbia
Chemult toward Los Angeles	Coast Starlight	Albany toward Seattle
Former services
Preceding station	Amtrak	Following station
Terminus	Willamette Valley	Albany toward Portland
Preceding station	Southern Pacific Railroad	Following station
Goshen Via Siskiyou Line toward Oakland Pier	Shasta Route	Junction City toward Portland
Springfield Via Cascade Line toward Oakland Pier	Shasta Route	Junction City toward Portland
Veneta toward Marshfield	Marshfield – Eugene	Terminus
- Southern Pacific Passenger Depot
- U.S. National Register of Historic Places
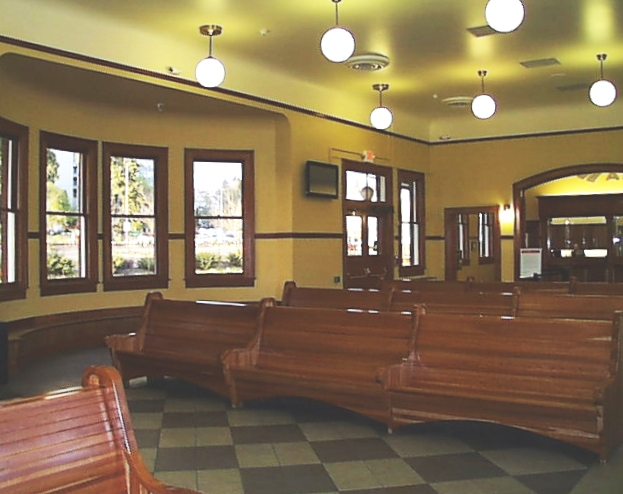
- Interior of the Eugene Depot
- Location: Eugene, Oregon
- Architect: Modeled after stations by H. H. Richardson
- Architectural style: American Craftsman, Richardsonian Romanesque
- NRHP reference No.: 07000823
- Added to NRHP: August 16, 2007
Location

Eugene station (alternately Eugene–Springfield station) is a train station in Eugene, Oregon, United States. It is served by Amtrak's Coast Starlight passenger train and is the southern terminus of the Amtrak Cascades corridor. The station is also served by the Cascades POINT bus service.

== History ==
The station was built in 1908 by the Southern Pacific Railroad and was listed on the National Register of Historic Places as the Southern Pacific Passenger Depot in 2007.

The current station is the third passenger depot built at this location. Built of masonry, it is one of five masonry depots that still exist along the original Southern Pacific West Coast line. The other depots are in Albany, Medford, Roseburg and Salem.

When Amtrak took over intercity rail operations in 1971, it cut back service to a single train through Eugene, what eventually became the Coast Starlight. A brief attempt at corridor service began in 1980 with the Willamette Valley, but ended in 1981. For the next 13 years, the only intercity service through Eugene was the Coast Starlight, which arrived northbound at lunchtime and southbound during the afternoon rush. However, in 1994, Amtrak extended the Seattle-Portland Mount Rainier to Eugene on a trial basis. This proved successful enough that the train was renamed the Cascadia in 1995. The Cascadia was merged into Amtrak Cascades along with all of Amtrak's other Pacific Northwest services in 1998, and a Portland-Eugene round trip was added in 2000.

Southern Pacific sold the building to the Jenova Land Company in 1993, and ten years later the city of Eugene bought the depot as part of a plan to develop a regional transportation center. In 2004, the city oversaw a $4.5 million restoration project. Workers restored the exterior brickwork and trim and gutted and renovated the interior. New tile floors, oak and fir trim, covered ceilings, wooden benches and expanded bathrooms were installed.

== See also ==
- Southern Pacific Railroad Passenger Station and Freight House — another former Southern Pacific station in Springfield on the NRHP
- Oregon Electric Railway Passenger Station — adjacent former interurban railway station on the NRHP
