= Klamath (train) =

Passenger train in the western United States

Overview
- Service type: Inter-city rail
- Status: Discontinued
- Locale: Northern California and Oregon
- First service: May 1, 1929
- Last service: September 30, 1956
- Former operator: Southern Pacific

Route
- Termini: Oakland, California; Portland, Oregon

Technical
- Track gauge: 4 ft 8 1/2 in (1,435 mm) standard gauge

The Klamath was a passenger train of the Southern Pacific on its route between Oakland, California, and Portland, Oregon, using the line through Klamath Falls, Oregon, between Mount Shasta and Eugene, Oregon. The Southern Pacific started the train on May 1, 1929. The Klamath became the bottom-ranked train on the San Francisco-Portland line with multiple head-end cars making all stops to pick up and deliver express and mail along the route. There were a few coaches and a few sleeping cars, including one running through to Seattle, Washington. The train was initially given numbers 7 and 8 and renumbered 19 and 20 on May 1, 1936. Sleeping cars were eliminated from the train on September 23, 1956, and the name Klamath was dropped a week later when the train became head-end cars only.

== Consist ==
Trains 19 and 20 typically contained the following sequence of cars during the 1950s.

- 7 to 9 baggage express cars
- 1 railway post office
- 1 news agent coach
- 1 chair car
- 1 dining car
- 1 tourist sleeper
- 1 sleeper running through to Seattle over the Northern Pacific Railway
