= Coast Starlight =

Amtrak service between Seattle and Los Angeles

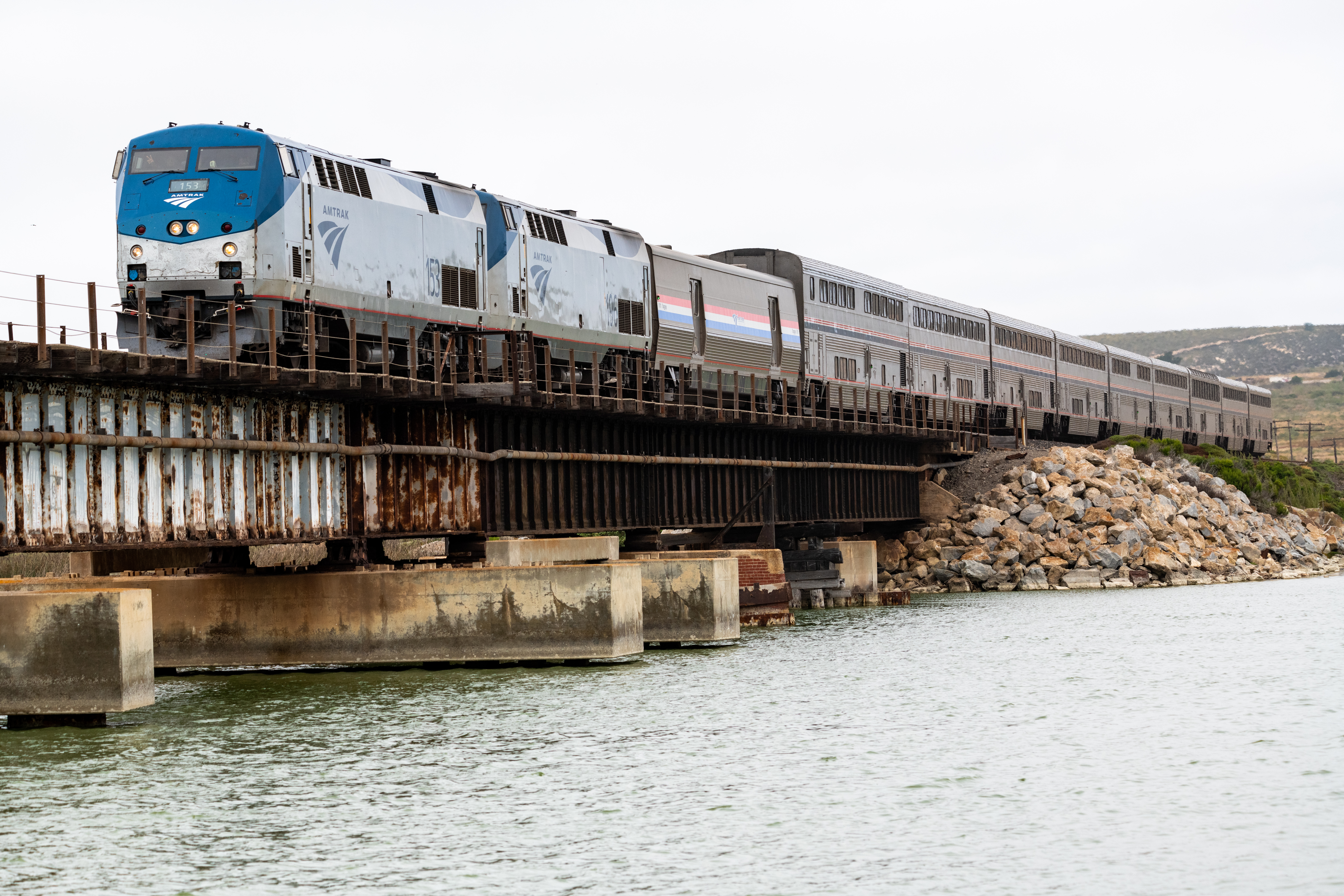
- Coast Starlight crossing the Santa Ynez River as it drains into the Pacific Ocean near Surf, California, 2019

Overview
- Service type: Inter-city rail
- Locale: Pacific Coast
- Predecessor: Coast Daylight, Cascade
- First service: May 1, 1971
- Current operator: Amtrak
- Annual ridership: 375,571 (FY 25) ▲4.8% (Note: Amtrak's Fiscal Year (FY) runs from October 1 of the prior year to September 30 of the named year.)

Route
- Termini: Seattle, Washington; Los Angeles, California
- Stops: 28
- Distance travelled: 1,377 miles (2,216 km)
- Average journey time: 35 hours, 21 minutes (southbound); 34 hours (northbound)
- Service frequency: Daily
- Train number: 11, 14

On-board services
- Classes: Coach Class; First Class Sleeper Service
- Disabled access: Train lower level, all stations
- Sleeping arrangements: Roomette (2 beds); Bedroom (2 beds); Bedroom Suite (4 beds); Accessible Bedroom (2 beds); Family Bedroom (4 beds)
- Catering facilities: Dining car, Café
- Observation facilities: Sightseer lounge car
- Baggage facilities: Overhead racks, checked baggage available at selected stations

Technical
- Rolling stock: Superliner
- Track gauge: 4 ft 8 1/2 in (1,435 mm) standard gauge
- Operating speed: 40 mph (64 km/h) (avg.); 79 mph (127 km/h) (top)
- Track owners: BNSF, SCAX, SDRX, JPBX, UP

The Coast Starlight is a long-distance passenger train operated by Amtrak on the West Coast of the United States between Seattle and Los Angeles via Portland and the San Francisco Bay Area. The train, which has operated continuously since Amtrak's formation in 1971, was the first to offer direct service between Seattle and Los Angeles. Its name is a combination of two prior Southern Pacific (SP) trains, the Coast Daylight and the Starlight.

During fiscal year (FY) 2024, the Coast Starlight carried 359,432 passengers, an increase of 6.3% from FY 2023. In FY 2024, the train made 730 trips and 1 million train miles; it had a total revenue of $49.5 million, and operating expenses of $93.9 million.

== History ==
=== Background ===
Before the formation of Amtrak, no passenger train ran the entire length of the West Coast. The closest equivalent was the Southern Pacific Railroad (SP)'s West Coast, which ran via the San Joaquin Valley from Los Angeles to Portland from 1924 to 1949, with through cars to Seattle via the Great Northern Railway (GN).

By 1971, the SP operated just two daily trains between Los Angeles and the San Francisco Bay Area: the Los Angeles–San Francisco Coast Daylight via the Coast Line, and the Los Angeles–Oakland San Joaquin Daylight via the Central Valley. The SP also operated the tri-weekly Cascade between Oakland and Portland, Oregon. The Burlington Northern Railroad (BN) and Union Pacific Railroad ran three daily round trips between Portland and Seattle. The Santa Fe ran the San Diegan between Los Angeles and San Diego.

=== Amtrak era ===
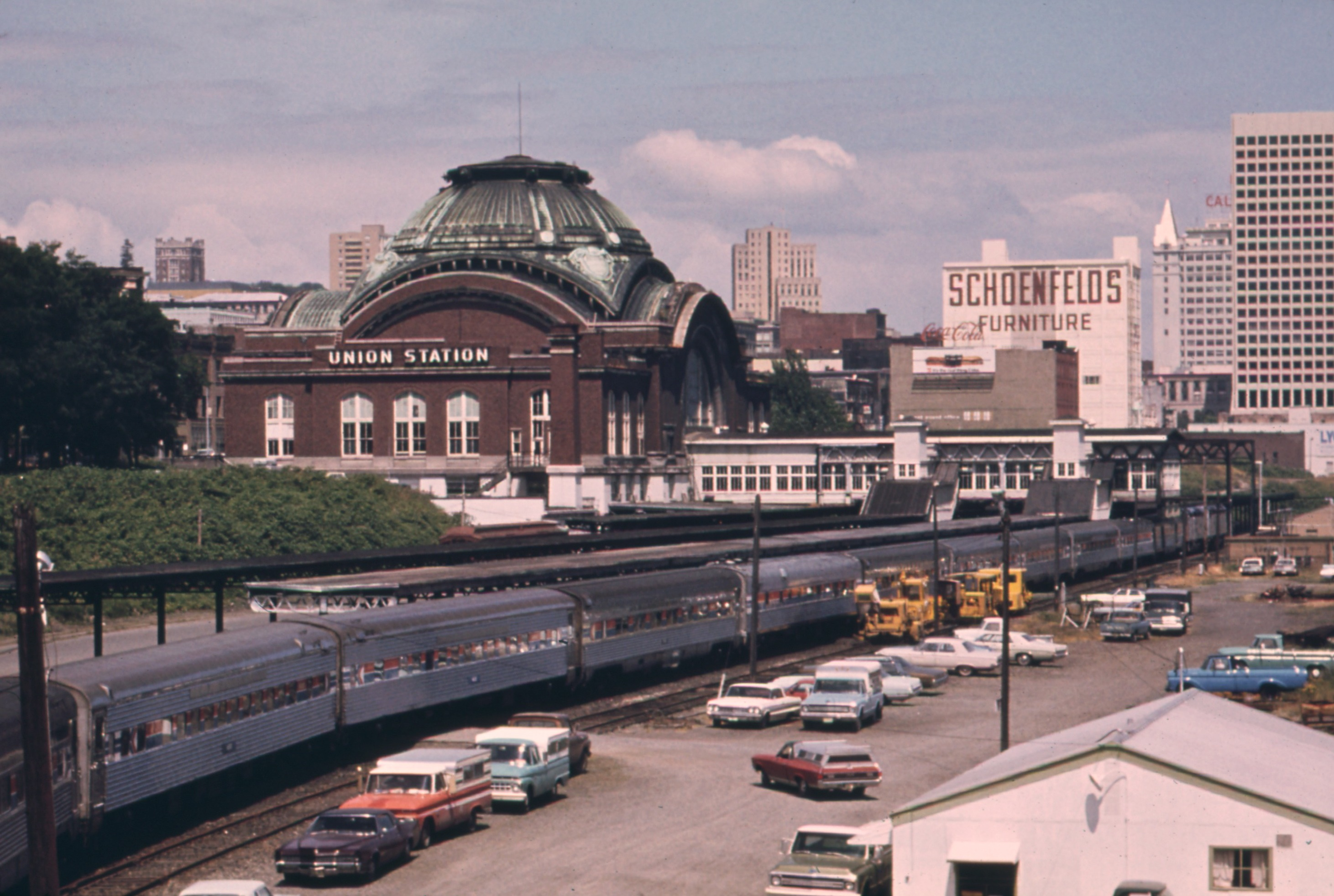
The Coast Starlight at Tacoma in 1974

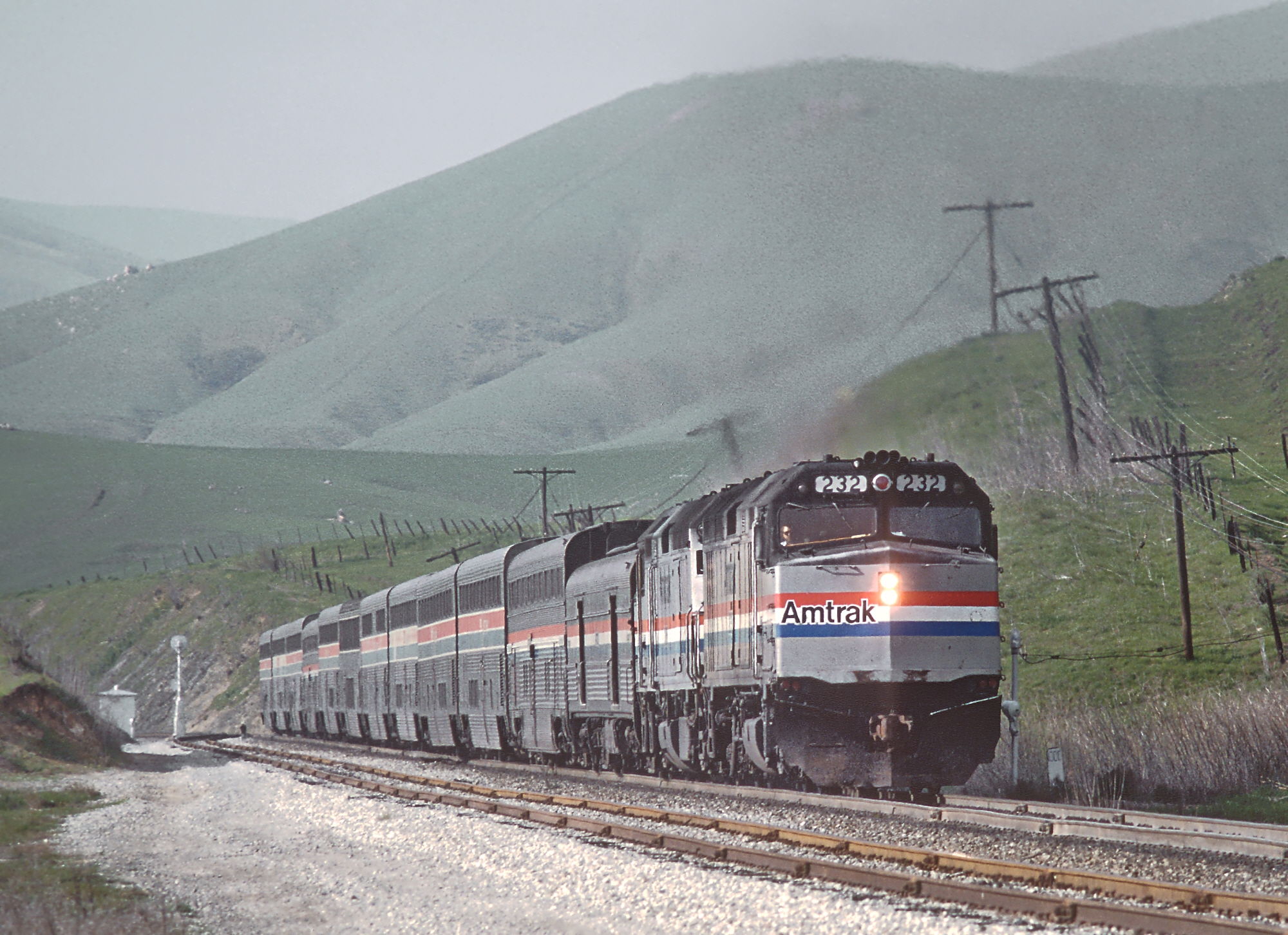
The Coast Starlight on the Cuesta Grade above San Luis Obispo in 1985

The Seattle–San Diego route was initially left out of plans for Railpax (later Amtrak) until protests from politicians in California, Oregon, and Washington. With the start of Amtrak operations on May 1, 1971, a single train began running between Seattle and San Diego. The unnamed train (#11/12) ran three days a week; on the other four days, another unnamed train (#98/99) ran between Oakland and Los Angeles. On November 14, Amtrak extended the Oakland–Los Angeles train to San Diego, renumbered it to #12/13, and renamed it Coast Daylight. The Seattle–San Diego train became the Coast Daylight/Starlight (#11-12) northbound and Coast Starlight/Daylight (#13-14) southbound. Both trains were cut back from San Diego to Los Angeles in April 1972, replaced by a third San Diegan. On June 10, 1973, Amtrak began running the combined Coast Daylight/Starlight daily for the summer months. Positive response led to Amtrak to retain this service, and the Coast Daylight name was dropped on May 19, 1974.

An additional train, the Spirit of California, ran the section of the route between Sacramento and Los Angeles on an overnight schedule from October 25, 1981, to September 30, 1983. From November 10, 1996, to October 25, 1997, through coaches were transferred between the Coast Starlight and San Diegan at Los Angeles.

The Coast Starlight originally used the Southern Pacific West Valley Line between Tehama and Davis. That route included a stop at Orland, but bypassed Sacramento. On April 26, 1982, the train was rerouted via Roseville on the Southern Pacific Valley and Martinez Subdivisions, with stops added at Sacramento, Chico, and Marysville, per request from the state. In 1999, the Coast Starlight was rerouted onto the more direct ex-Western Pacific Sacramento Subdivision between Marysville and Sacramento, with the Marysville stop closed.

Ridership declined by 26% between 1999 and 2005 as freight congestion and track maintenance on the Union Pacific Railroad reduced the Coast Starlight's on-time performance to 2%, which Amtrak characterized as "dismal." By mid-summer in 2006 delays of 5–11 hours were common. Critics dubbed the train the Star-late. During early summer 2008, the Coast Starlight was relaunched with new amenities and refurbished equipment. In July 2008, refurbished Pacific Parlour cars returned to service as part of the relaunch. This was much anticipated, due to the success of Amtrak's relaunch of the Empire Builder. Between FY 2008 and FY 2009, ridership on the Coast Starlight jumped 15% from 353,657 passengers to 406,398 passengers. Operating conditions on the UP improved as well; by May 2008 on-time performance had reached 86%.

Service was suspended north of Sacramento for a month in 2017 after a freight derailment damaged a bridge near Mount Shasta, California.

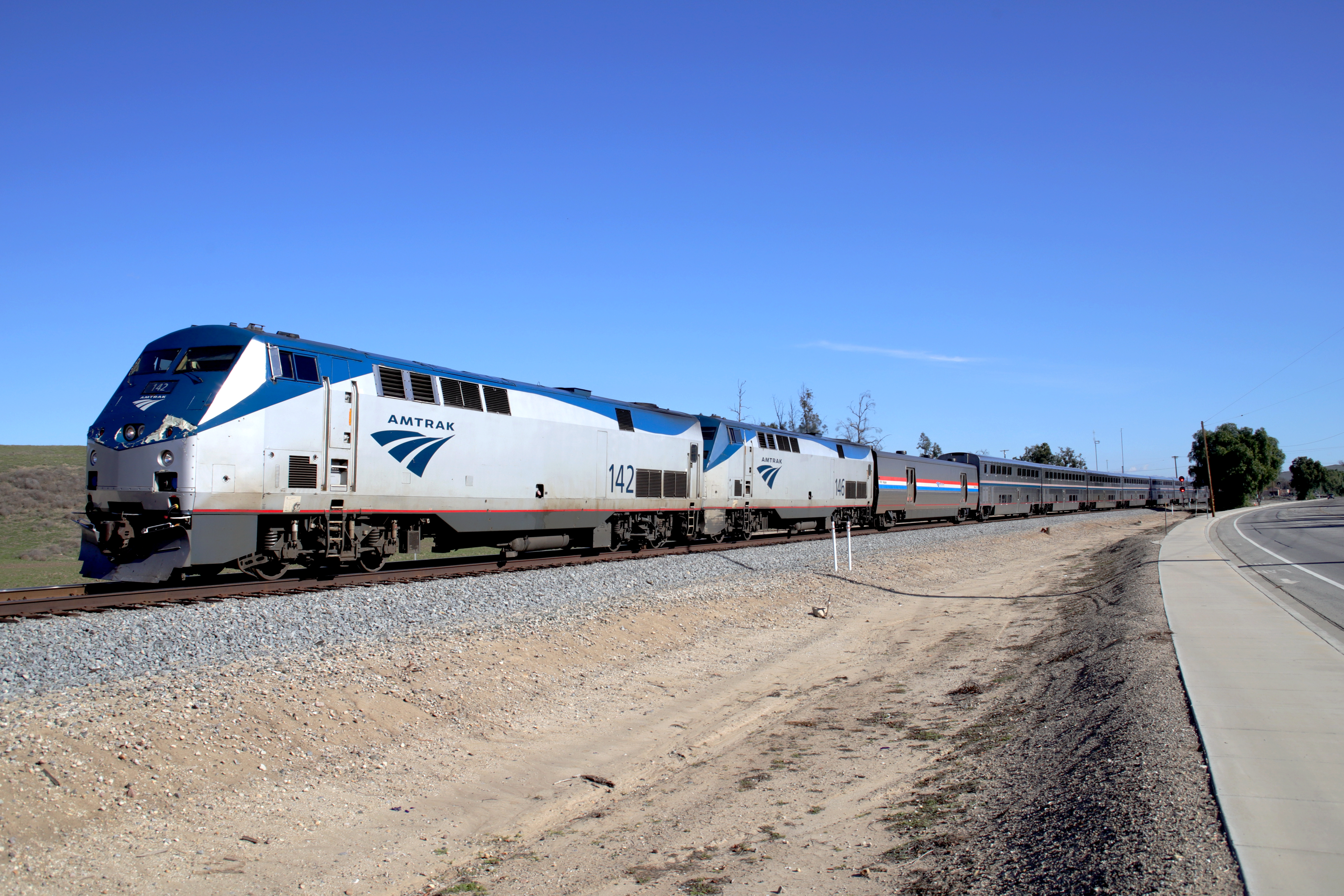
Coast Starlight 14 northbound to Seattle passing Moorpark, California, on December 27, 2018

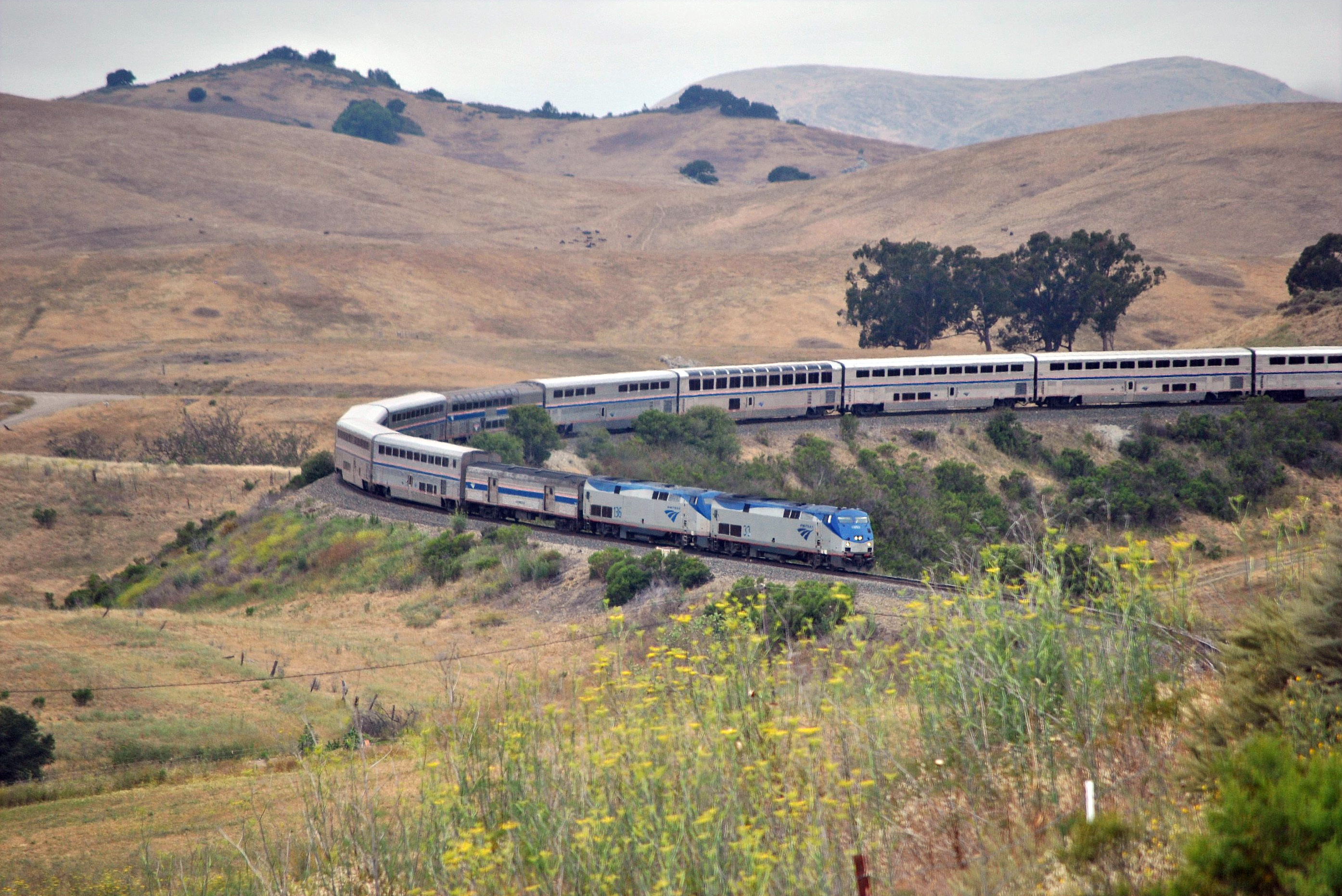
The southbound Coast Starlight passes through a horseshoe curve on the lower Cuesta Grade, north of San Luis Obispo.

On February 24, 2019, the southbound Coast Starlight struck a fallen tree near Oakridge, Oregon, after a rare heavy snowstorm. The train was stranded for 36 hours before tracks could be cleared for a Union Pacific locomotive to tow the train back to Eugene–Springfield.

From October 1, 2020, to May 24, 2021, daily service was reduced to three trains per week due to the COVID-19 pandemic. On May 24, 2021, as part of its post-COVID service restorations, Amtrak restored the Coast Starlight frequency to daily service in both directions.

In late June 2021, the Lava Fire seriously damaged a Union Pacific trestle on the Black Butte Subdivision between Klamath Falls, Oregon, and Dunsmuir, California. As a result, the Coast Starlight was initially split into two segments: Seattle to Klamath Falls and Sacramento to Los Angeles with a bus replacement service filling the gap between Klamath Falls and Sacramento. However, on July 2, 2021, it was announced that service would be discontinued between Seattle and Sacramento until July 14, 2021, with Amtrak Cascades replacing service for passengers booked between Seattle and Eugene. Through service resumed on July 15, using overnight buses between Sacramento and Klamath Falls, and full-route train operation resumed on August 23.

A resurgence of the COVID-19 virus caused by the Omicron variant caused Amtrak to reduce the frequency of this route to five-weekly round trips from January to March 2022.

Trains began running over the Point Defiance Bypass between Tacoma and DuPont, Washington starting on November 18, 2021.

=== Future improvements ===
The 2018 California State Rail Plan, prepared by Caltrans, outlines a number of planned improvements to rail infrastructure in the state of California. The plan was updated in 2023. In 2022, the California Transportation Commission approved $7.5 million for the construction of a new station in King City to improve access to the region, including nearby Fort Hunter Liggett and Pinnacles National Park. There is also a proposal in the Capitol Corridor Vision plan to improve the right-of-way shared by the Capitol Corridor and Coast Starlight between Oakland and Martinez. The proposal would re-route the train from along the shores of San Pablo Bay and the Carquinez Strait to a new tunnel through Franklin Canyon and a right-of-way next to California State Route 4 that would reduce the trip time by several minutes.

== Route ==
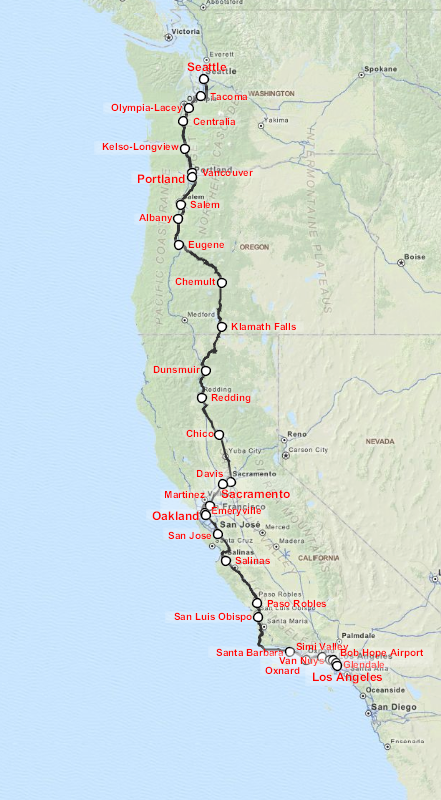
Coast Starlight route map

Except for two sections, most of the Coast Starlight route is on former Southern Pacific lines now owned by the Union Pacific Railroad. The Coast Starlight runs over the following lines:

- BNSF Seattle Subdivision (ex-NP, later ex-BN): Seattle, Washington to Tacoma, Washington
- Sound Transit (SDRX) Point Defiance Bypass: Tacoma to DuPont, Washington
- BNSF Seattle Subdivision: DuPont to Portland, Oregon
- UP Brooklyn Subdivision: Portland to Eugene, Oregon
- UP Cascade Subdivision: Eugene to Klamath Falls, Oregon
- UP Black Butte Subdivision: Klamath Falls to Dunsmuir, California
- UP Valley Subdivision: Dunsmuir to Marysville, California
- UP Sacramento Subdivision (ex-WP): Marysville to Sacramento, California
- UP Martinez Subdivision: Sacramento to Oakland, California
- UP Niles Subdivision: Oakland to Elmhurst, California
- UP Coast Subdivision: Elmhurst to Santa Clara, California
- Caltrain (JPBX) Peninsula Subdivision: Santa Clara to Tamien, California
- UP Coast Subdivision: Tamien to San Luis Obispo, California
- UP Santa Barbara Subdivision: San Luis Obispo to Moorpark, California
- Metrolink (SCAX) Ventura Subdivision: Moorpark to Taylor Yard, Los Angeles
- Metrolink (SCAX) River Subdivision: Taylor Yard to Los Angeles Union Station

The Coast Starlight is occasionally diverted between Oakland and Los Angeles via the Central Valley and Tehachapi Pass due to track work or service disruptions on the Coast Line. These rerouted trains are popular with railfans because they use the Tehachapi Loop, which has not had regularly scheduled passenger trains since 1971.

=== Stations ===
Amtrak Coast Starlight stations
State/Province	City	Station	Connections
Washington	Seattle	Seattle King Street	Amtrak: Amtrak Cascades, Empire Builder; Amtrak Thruway; Sounder: N Line, S Line; Link Light Rail:, First Hill Streetcar; ST Express, Travel Washington; Community Transit, King County Metro
Washington	Tacoma	Tacoma Dome	Amtrak: Amtrak Cascades; Sounder: S Line Link Light Rail: Greyhound Lines; ST Express; Intercity Transit, Pierce Transit
Washington	Lacey	Olympia–Lacey	Amtrak: Amtrak Cascades; Intercity Transit
Washington	Centralia	Centralia	Amtrak: Amtrak Cascades; Lewis County Transit
Washington	Kelso	Kelso	Amtrak: Amtrak Cascades; Greyhound Lines; RiverCities Transit
Washington	Vancouver	Vancouver	Amtrak: Amtrak Cascades, Empire Builder
Oregon	Portland	Portland	Amtrak: Amtrak Cascades, Empire Builder; MAX Light Rail: Orange Line, Yellow Line, Green Line; Portland Streetcar; The Bus, Central Oregon Breeze, FlixBus, Pacific Crest Lines, POINT, Shuttle Oregon, The Wave; Trimet Bus
Oregon	Salem	Salem	Amtrak: Amtrak Cascades; Greyhound Lines; POINT, Shuttle Oregon, The Wave; Cherriots
Oregon	Albany	Albany	Amtrak: Amtrak Cascades; POINT; Albany Transit System, Benton Area Transit, Linn-Benton Loop, Linn Shuttle
Oregon	Eugene	Eugene–Springfield	Amtrak: Amtrak Cascades; POINT, Pacific Crest Bus Lines; Lane Transit District, Link Lane
Oregon	Chemult	Chemult	Pacific Crest Bus Lines
Oregon	Klamath Falls	Klamath Falls	POINT, Pacific Crest Bus Lines; Basin Transit Service, Crater Lake Trolley, Sage Stage
California	Dunsmuir	Dunsmuir	
California	Redding	Redding	Amtrak Thruway: 3; Greyhound Lines; FlixBus; Redding Area Bus Authority, Sage Stage, Trinity Transit
California	Chico	Chico	Amtrak Thruway: 3; Greyhound Lines; FlixBus; Glenn Ride
California	Sacramento	Sacramento	Amtrak: California Zephyr, Capitol Corridor, Gold Runner; Amtrak Thruway: 3, 20, 20C; SacRT: Gold; El Dorado Transit, Sacramento RT
California	Davis	Davis	Amtrak: California Zephyr, Capitol Corridor; Amtrak Thruway: 3; Unitrans
California	Martinez	Martinez	Amtrak: California Zephyr, Capitol Corridor, Gold Runner; Amtrak Thruway: 7; County Connection, Tri Delta Transit, WestCAT
California	Emeryville	Emeryville	Amtrak: California Zephyr, Capitol Corridor, Gold Runner; Amtrak Thruway: 99; AC Transit, Emery Go-Round
California	Oakland	Oakland–Jack London Square	Amtrak: Capitol Corridor, Gold Runner; Amtrak Thruway: 17; AC Transit
California	San Jose	San Jose Diridon	Amtrak: Capitol Corridor; Amtrak Thruway: 6, 17, 21; Altamont Corridor Express; Caltrain; VTA Light Rail: Green Line; Greyhound Lines; Santa Cruz Metro, VTA Bus
California	Salinas	Salinas	Amtrak Thruway: 17, 21; Greyhound Lines; Monterey-Salinas Transit
California	Paso Robles	Paso Robles	Amtrak Thruway: 17, 18, 21; Monterey-Salinas Transit, Paso Express, San Luis Obispo Regional Transit Authority
California	San Luis Obispo	San Luis Obispo	Amtrak: Pacific Surfliner; Amtrak Thruway: 17, 18, 21; SLO Transit
California	Santa Barbara	Santa Barbara	Amtrak: Pacific Surfliner; Amtrak Thruway: 10, 17, 21; Greyhound Lines; FlixBus; Santa Barbara MTD
California	Oxnard	Oxnard	Amtrak: Pacific Surfliner; Amtrak Thruway: 10; Metrolink: Ventura County; Greyhound Lines; FlixBus; Gold Coast Transit
California	Simi Valley	Simi Valley	Amtrak: Pacific Surfliner; Metrolink: Ventura County; VCTC Intercity; Simi Valley Transit
California	Van Nuys	Van Nuys	Amtrak: Pacific Surfliner; Amtrak Thruway: 1C; Metrolink: Ventura County; LADOT DASH, Los Angeles Metro Bus
California	Burbank	Burbank Airport-South	Amtrak: Pacific Surfliner; Amtrak Thruway: 1C; Metrolink: Ventura County; Burbank Bus, Los Angeles Metro Bus
California	Los Angeles	Los Angeles Union	Amtrak: Pacific Surfliner, Southwest Chief, Sunset Limited, Texas Eagle; Amtrak Thruway: 1; Metrolink: 91/Perris Valley Antelope Valley Orange County Riverside San Bernardino Ventura County; Metro: A Line, B Line, D Line, J Line; FlixBus; Greyhound Lines; Los Angeles Metro Bus, Antelope Valley Transit Authority, City of Commerce Transit, City of Santa Clarita Transit, LAX FlyAway, LADOT Commuter Express, LADOT DASH, Mount St. Mary's College Shuttle, University of Southern California Shuttles, Foothill Transit, Big Blue Bus, Torrance Transit, Dodger Stadium Express

== Equipment ==
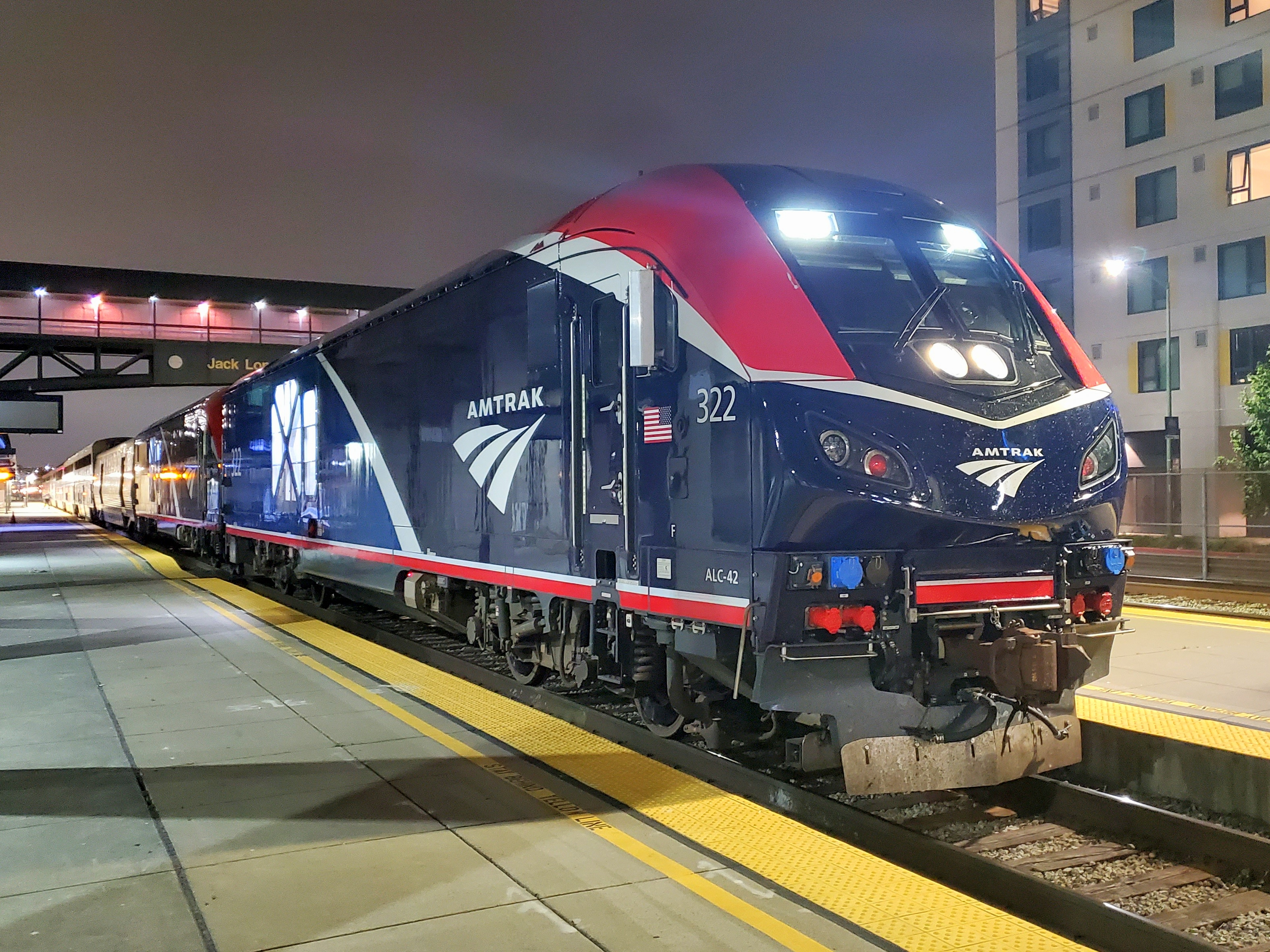
ALC-42 Charger locomotives on the Coast Starlight in May 2023

The Coast Starlight typically uses two GE P42DC or Siemens ALC-42 locomotives. The train uses double-decker Superliner equipment, including a Sightseer Lounge car that has floor-to-ceiling windows to view the passing scenery. As of 2024, a typical consist has a Viewliner baggage car, a transition sleeper, two sleeping cars, two coaches, one coach/baggage car, the lounge car, and a dining car. As of March 2025, Amtrak intends to add a third coach in May 2025.

Prior to February 2018, the Coast Starlight was unique in that it included a first-class lounge car called the "Pacific Parlour Car". The cars were Budd Hi-Level Sky Lounge cars, built in 1956 for the Santa Fe's El Capitan service. Called a "living room on rails", the Parlour car offered several amenities to first-class sleeping car passengers including wireless Internet access, a full bar, a small library with books and games, an afternoon wine tasting, and a movie theater on the lower level. Sleeping car passengers could also make reservations to dine in the Parlour car, which offered a unique menu not offered in the standard dining car. In February 2018, in a cost-cutting measure, Amtrak retired the Pacific Parlour Cars, citing the move as "part of Amtrak's ongoing work to modernize its fleet of equipment."
