= Cascade (train) =

Passenger train in the western United States

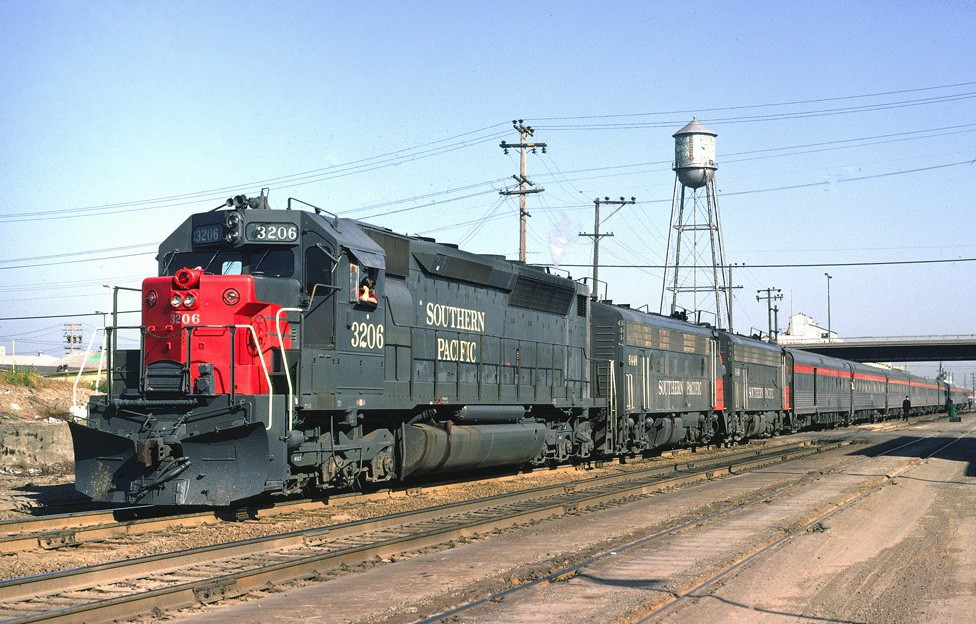
- An EMD SDP45 and two FP7s lead the Cascade into Berkeley, California, in April 1971

Overview
- Service type: Inter-city rail
- Status: Discontinued
- Locale: Northern California and Oregon
- First service: April 17, 1927
- Last service: April 30, 1971
- Successor: Coast Starlight
- Former operator: Southern Pacific

Route
- Termini: Oakland, California; Portland, Oregon
- Stops: 15

Technical
- Track gauge: 4 ft 8 1/2 in (1,435 mm) standard gauge

The Cascade was a passenger train of the Southern Pacific on its route between Oakland, California, and Portland, Oregon, with a sleeping car to Seattle, Washington. The Southern Pacific started the train on April 17, 1927, soon after the opening of its Cascade Line between Black Butte, California, and Springfield, Oregon.

At first the train offered first class service and a $3.00 extra fare; it became an all-Pullman train in 1937. On August 13, 1950, the Cascade became a streamlined coach/Pullman train with a triple-unit diner and cars painted in two shades of gray. The next 21 years saw a decline. The Seattle sleeper was discontinued in 1966, the triple-unit diner came off a year later. By 1970 the train was down to five or six cars and ran only three days per week. Amtrak would take over the Cascade on May 1, 1971, and would combine it with the San Francisco–Los Angeles Coast Daylight routing the train through Oakland and eventually renaming it the Coast Starlight.

== History ==
The Shasta Route into Oregon was completed on December 17, 1887, connecting California points to Portland, Seattle, and the Pacific Northwest. The Oregon and California Express was the first passenger service; it later gained fame as the Shasta Limited. But the route over the Siskiyou Mountains of Southern Oregon was difficult with steep grades, sharp curves, and subject to landslides and washouts. During the reign of Edward H. Harriman Southern Pacific began building a better route via Klamath Falls. Government involvement in the affairs of Harriman and the SP would delay completion for 18 years.

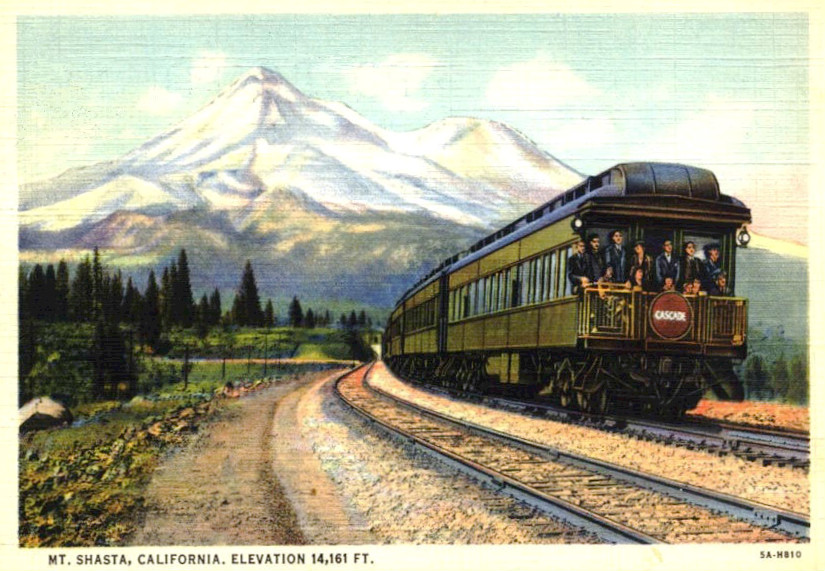
Postcard of the train in 1935

Trains began using the new Natron Cutoff or Cascade Line in 1926, but passenger service began several months later after the old Weed Lumber Company line south of Grass Lake was replaced. The Cascade would offer better service than the Shasta Limited (which in 1926 was scheduled 27 hours Portland to San Francisco). At first the train had a $3.00 extra fare and numbers 17 and 18.

This train would survive the depression through consolidations and a change of numbers (19 and 20). The extra fare was dropped. With the better economy Southern Pacific re-equipped the Cascade and by 1937 it was an all-Pullman train with numbers 23 and 24 and a schedule under 20 hours.

For three years during World War II the Cascade was combined with the Beaver. After the war the train got new equipment and a faster schedule. On June 5, 1950, the first streamlined Pullman was placed in service on the route. Southern Pacific was also experimenting with diesel power. The result would be the greatest presentation of this train; a faster, dieselized, streamlined, all-Pullman, daily overnight service second-to-none.

== Southern Pacific Streamliner Cascade ==
Trains 11-12
Oakland – Portland - Seattle
Service Start - August 13, 1950
Oakland – Portland - Daily overnight All-Pullman - 713 miles - 16 hours 45 minutes
1. 12 Depart Oakland - 4:35PM, Arrive Portland - 8:15AM
2. 11 Depart Portland - 4:45PM, Arrive Oakland - 8:20AM
Connecting service to San Francisco was provided by ferry until 1958 when switch was made to bus service over the Bay Bridge

The streamlined Cascade became the SP's overnight train between Oakland and Portland with through sleeping cars to and from Seattle. It was the second all room sleeping car train along the west coast. The new thirteen car Pullman Standard built consists were initially powered by A-B-B sets of EMD E7 diesels but were replaced in weeks by A-B-A sets of ALCO PA passenger diesels painted in daylight colors. The Cascade cars painted in the two tone Gray of the Lark and San Francisco Overland trains. The Southern Pacific streamlined Cascade began service on August 13, 1950, and was an all Pullman train for the shortest length of time, for beginning October 11, 1950, the Cascade began to carry coaches between Oakland and Portland. The through sleepers to Seattle numbered four and traveled north from Portland in the Union Pacific Railroad (UP) pool train to Seattle Union Station. Upon arrival in Seattle the four sleeping cars were switched out and transferred to the Northern Pacific Railway (NP) on the other side of Fourth Avenue viaduct at the King Street Station. The next morning these four through sleeping cars would depart Seattle in the NP pool train and transfer to the Cascade that afternoon in Portland for the trip to Oakland.

=== Inaugural Train #11 ===
6005 ALCO PA-1 2,000 HP Diesel Passenger Cab Unit
5911 ALCO PB-1 2,000 HP Diesel Passenger Booster Unit
6007 ALCO PA-1 2,000 HP Diesel Passenger Cab Unit
6500 Baggage Car
6600 Baggage Railway Post Office Car
9300 22-Roomette Sleeping Car
9400 12-Double Bedroom Sleeping Car
9030 10-Roomette 6-Double Bedroom Sleeping Car
10280 Articulated 21- Crew Dormitory Kitchen Car
10281 Articulated 44- Seat Dining Room Car
10282 Articulated 44- Seat Tavern Lounge Car
(CASCADE CLUB)
9118 4-Compartment 4-Double Bedroom 2-Drawing Room Sleeping Car
9031 10-Roomette 6-Double Bedroom Sleeping Car
9032 10-Roomette 6-Double Bedroom Sleeping Car
9301 22-Roomette Sleeping Car
9053 10-Roomette 6-Double Bedroom Sleeping Car (Blunt End)

Sleeping cars 9118, 9031, 9032 and 9301 originated in Seattle and were carried by NP pool train from there to Portland.

=== Inaugural Train #12 ===
6006 ALCO PA-1 2,000 HP Diesel Passenger Cab Unit
5912 ALCO PB-1 2,000 HP Diesel Passenger Booster Unit
6008 ALCO PA-1 2,000 HP Diesel Passenger Cab Unit
6501 Baggage Car
6601 Baggage 30’Railway Post Office Car
9302 22-Roomette Sleeping Car
9401 12-Double Bedroom sleeping Car
9033 10-Roomette 6-Double Bedroom Sleeping Car
10283 Articulated 21- Crew Dormitory Kitchen Car
10284 Articulated 44- Seat Dining Room Car
10285 Articulated 44- Seat Tavern Lounge Car
(CASCADE CLUB)
9119 4-Compartment 4-Double Bedroom 2-Drawing Room Sleeping Car
9034 10-Roomette 6-Double Bedroom Sleeping Car
9035 10-Roomette 6-Double Bedroom Sleeping Car
9303 22-Roomette Sleeping Car
9054 10-Roomette 6-Double Bedroom Sleeping Car (Blunt End)

Sleeping cars 9119, 9034, 9035 and 9303 were Oakland – Seattle cars forwarded in the UP pool train to Seattle. After arrival in Seattle at Union Station they were turned over to the NP under the 4th Ave. viaduct and went to the NP-GN coach yard for cleaning and servicing for the next mornings departure in the NP pool train from King Street Station to Portland.

The streamlined Cascade was an all – Pullman train only until October 10, 1950, when coaches were added to the train sets. Coaches 2425 and 2431 operated in one consist and 2433 and 2437 operated in the other consist. No coaches were through cars to Seattle; all Coach travelers crossed the platform in Portland to the waiting UP pool train northbound to Seattle. Southbound coach passengers from Seattle arrived in Portland on the NP pool train and again crossed the platform to the waiting Cascade.

== The final years ==
Through sleeping car service to and from Seattle ended January 9, 1966. The triple-unit diner came off a year later. Southern Pacific tried to replace it with an automat service but the Oregon Public Utility Commission balked, forcing the railroad to place a regular diner on the train. The two-tone gray colors were already gone, replaced by SP's new passenger color scheme of Sunset-style aluminum mist with red letterboard. Yellow sleeping cars from the City of San Francisco and San Francisco Overland trains were also seen in the nightly consist. By 1970, after trying for two years to discontinue the service, Southern Pacific was allowed to trim the Cascade to triweekly. By this time, the train had a later departure time allowing daylight viewing of the Willamette Valley and part of the Cascade Mountains.

== Amtrak takes over ==
A quasi-government agency, the National Railroad Passenger Corporation – or Amtrak – took over the remains of America's passenger train system on May 1, 1971. The Cascade was included but was combined with the San Francisco to Los Angeles Coast Daylight. With service rerouted through Oakland, the train was rechristened as the Coast Starlight. It continued to run triweekly north of Oakland, but its popularity would lead to restoration of daily service in 1973.
