= Crowley, Malheur County, Oregon =

Unincorporated community in the state of Oregon, United States

Crowley, Oregon
- Unincorporated community
- Location within Oregon Location within the United States
- Coordinates: 43°17′30″N 117°53′40″W
- Country: United States
- State: Oregon
- County: Malheur
- Elevation: 4,078 ft (1,243 m)
- Time zone: UTC−07:00 (Mountain)
  - Summer (DST): UTC−06:00 (Mountain)
- Area code: 541
- GNIS feature ID: 1119587

Crowley is an unincorporated community in Malheur County, Oregon, United States. It lies along Crowley Road, north of Oregon Route 78, about 50 miles (80 km) east of Crane. Crowley Ranch and Crowley Ranch Airstrip are nearby. Crowley Creek was named for Green Berry Crowley who settled on its banks with his son James in 1874. The Crowleys' home was burned in 1878 during the Bannock War but the family escaped. Crowley post office was established in 1911 and ran until 1935. There was previously a Crowley post office in Polk County.

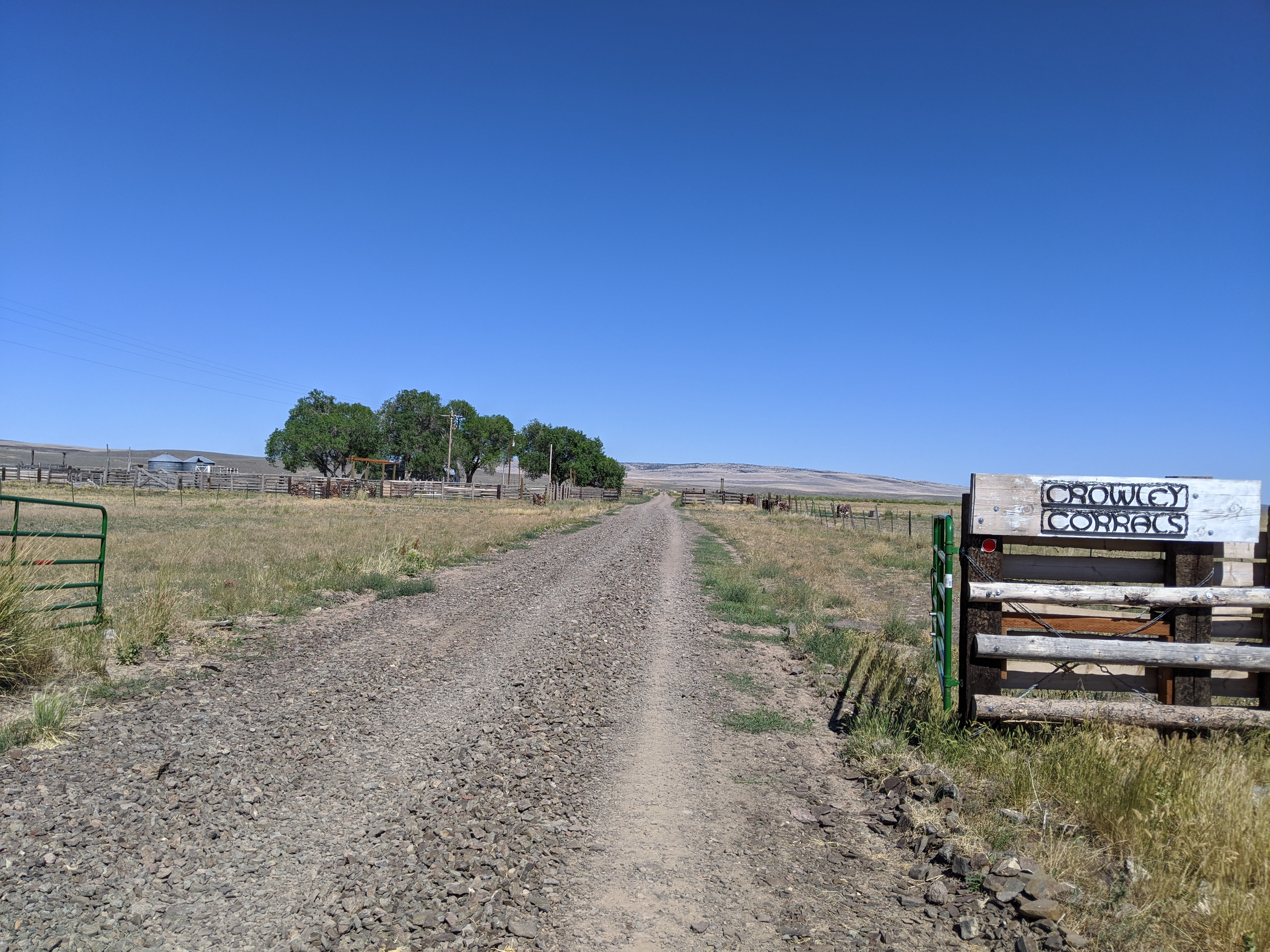
Gate to the Crowley Corrals in Crowley, Oregon
