= 2020 Pac-12 Conference football season =

American college football season

- League: NCAA Division I Football Bowl Subdivision
- Sport: Football
- Duration: November 7, 2020; January 2, 2021
- Teams: 12
- TV partner(s): Fox Sports Media Group, (Fox, FS1), ESPN Family, (ABC, ESPN, ESPN2, ESPNU), and Pac-12 Networks

2021 NFL Draft
- Top draft pick: OT Penei Sewell, Oregon
- Picked by: Detroit Lions, 7th overall

Regular season
- North champions: Washington
- North runners-up: Oregon
- South champions: USC
- South runners-up: Colorado

Pac-12 Championship
- Champions: Oregon
- Runners-up: USC
- Finals MVP: Kayvon Thibodeaux, Oregon

Football seasons
- 2019 2021

2020 Pac-12 Conference football standings
	Conf.			Overall
Team	W		L	W		L
North Division
Washington x	3	–	1	3	–	1
Oregon y$	3	–	2	4	–	3
Stanford	4	–	2	4	–	2
California	1	–	3	1	–	3
Washington State	1	–	3	1	–	3
Oregon State	2	–	5	2	–	5
South Division
No. 21 USC xy	5	–	0	5	–	1
Colorado	3	–	1	4	–	2
Utah	3	–	2	3	–	2
Arizona State	2	–	2	2	–	2
UCLA	3	–	4	3	–	4
Arizona	0	–	5	0	–	5
Championship: Oregon 31, USC 24
$ – Conference champion; x – Division champion/co-champions; y – Championship game participant; Note: Due to COVID-19, the Pac-12 suspended the season on August 11, but later decided to begin play on November 6. In addition to the title game on December 18, the conference seeded all remaining teams for a game during that weekend.; Rankings from AP Poll.

The 2020 Pac-12 Conference football season was the 42nd season of Pac-12 football taking place during the 2020 NCAA Division I FBS football season. The season was originally scheduled to begin on September 26, 2020, and end with the 2020 Pac-12 Championship Game on December 18–19, 2020, at Allegiant Stadium in Las Vegas, Nevada. On July 10, 2020, the Pac-12 announced that all competition in fall sports, including football, will be played exclusively in-conference due to the COVID-19 pandemic. On August 11, 2020, the Pac-12 Conference suspended all fall sports competitions due to the ongoing pandemic. On September 24, 2020 the Pac-12 Conference announced that the postponement of fall sports was to be ended and teams will return to play with a six-game Conference-only season to begin on November 6, and the Pac-12 Championship Game on December 18 with the rest of the conference seeded for a seventh game.

The Pac-12 was a Power Five Conference under the College Football Playoff format along with the Atlantic Coast Conference, the Big 12 Conference, Big Ten Conference, and the Southeastern Conference. The 2020 season was the tenth for the twelve Pac-12 teams to be divided into two divisions of six teams each, named North and South.

== Preseason ==
2020 Pac-12 Spring Football and number of signees on signing day:

North Division

- California –
- Oregon –
- Oregon State –
- Stanford –
- Washington –
- Washington State –

South Division

- Arizona –
- Arizona State –
- Colorado –
- UCLA –
- USC –
- Utah –

=== Recruiting classes ===
Rankings
Team	ESPN	Rivals	Scout & 24/7	Signees
Arizona	-	63	71	15
Arizona State	27	24	24	18
California	39	32	36	26
Colorado	31	34	33	23
Oregon	13	8	13	23
Oregon State	-	43	48	20
Stanford	20	25	22	18
UCLA	34	30	29	29
USC	-	64	56	12
Utah	-	42	34	17
Washington	15	13	15	22
Washington State	-	50	61	19

=== Pac-12 Media Days ===
The Pac-12 will conduct its 2020 Pac-12 media days at the Loews Hollywood Hotel, in Hollywood, California, in July on the Pac-12 Network.

The teams and representatives in respective order were as follows:

- Pac-12 Commissioner – Larry Scott
- Arizona – Kevin Sumlin (HC),
- Arizona State – Herm Edwards (HC),
- California – Justin Wilcox (HC),
- Colorado – Karl Dorrell (HC),
- Oregon – Mario Cristobal (HC),
- Oregon State – Jonathan Smith (HC),
- Stanford – David Shaw (HC),
- UCLA – Chip Kelly (HC),
- USC – Clay Helton (HC),
- Utah – Kyle Whittingham (HC),
- Washington – Jimmy Lake (HC),
- Washington State – Nick Rolovich (HC),

==== Preseason Media polls ====
The preseason polls was to be released in July 2020 but due to delaying the season it was released on October 7. Since 1992, the credentialed media has gotten the preseason champion correct just five times. Only nine times has the preseason pick even made it to the Pac-12 title game. Below are the results of the media poll with total points received next to each school and first-place votes in parentheses. For the 2020 poll, Oregon was voted as the favorite to win both the North Division and the Pac–12 Championship Game.

North
Predicted finish	Team	Votes (1st place)
1	Oregon	222 (35)
2	California	176 (3)
3	Washington	161
4	Stanford	105
5	Oregon State	76
6	Washington State	58

South
Predicted finish	Team	Votes (1st place)
1	USC	220 (32)
2	Arizona State	181 (2)
3	Utah	168 (4)
4	UCLA	109
5	Colorado	63
6	Arizona	57

Media poll (Pac-12 Championship)
Rank	Team	Votes
1	Oregon	21
2	USC	15
3	Arizona State	1
4	Utah	1

=== Preseason awards ===
==== Preseason All Pac-12 ====
First Team

Position	Player	Class	Team
First Team Offense
QB	Kedon Slovis	So.	USC
RB	C. J. Verdell	Jr.	Oregon
RB	Max Borghi	So.	Washington State
WR	Amon-Ra St. Brown	Jr.	USC (2)
WR	Tyler Vaughns	RSr.	USC (3)
TE	Brant Kuithe	Jr.	Utah
OL	Alijah Vera-Tucker	RJr.	USC (4)
OL	Abraham Lucas	RJr.	Washington State (2)
OL	Jaxson Kirkland	Jr.	Washington
OL	Nick Ford	Jr.	Utah (2)
OL	Drew Dalman	Sr.	Stanford
First Team Defense
DL	Kayvon Thibodeaux	So.	Oregon (2)
DL	Mustafa Johnson	Sr.	Colorado
DL	Jordon Scott	Sr.	Oregon (3)
DL	Jermayne Lole	Jr.	Arizona State
LB	Hamilcar Rashed Jr.	RSr.	Oregon State
LB	Nate Landman	Sr.	Colorado (2)
LB	Drake Jackson	So.	USC (5)
DB	Elijah Molden	Sr.	Washington (2)
DB	Camryn Bynum	RSr.	California
DB	Talanoa Hufanga	Jr.	USC (6)
DB	Deommodore Lenoir	Sr.	Oregon (4)
First Team Special Teams
PK	Blake Mazza	RJr.	Washington State (3)
P	Michael Turk	RJr.	Arizona State (2)
RT	Max Borghi	So.	Washington State (4)

Second Team

Position	Player	Class	Team
Second Team Offense
QB	Jayden Daniels	So.	Arizona State (3)
RB	Jermar Jefferson	Jr.	Oregon State (2)
RB	Christopher Brooks Jr.	Jr.	California (2)
WR	Frank Darby	GSr.	Arizona State (4)
WR	Johnny Johnson III	Sr.	Oregon (5)
TE	Cade Otton	Jr.	Washington (3)
OL	Orlando Umana	Sr.	Utah (3)
OL	Jake Curhan	RSr.	California (3)
OL	Dohnovan West	So.	Arizona State (4)
OL	Foster Sarell	Sr.	Stanford (2)
OL	Simi Moala	So.	Utah (4)
Second Team Defense
DL	Mika Tafua	Jr.	Utah (5)
DL	Thomas Booker	Jr.	Stanford (3)
DL	Osa Odighizuwa	RSr.	UCLA
DL	Brett Johnson	So.	California (3)
LB	Kuony Deng	RSr.	California (4)
LB	Jahad Woods	RSr.	Washington State (5)
LB	Ryan Bowman	Sr.	Washington (4)
DB	Jack Jones	RJr.	Arizona State (5)
DB	Elijah Hicks	Sr.	California (5)
DB	Mykael Wright	So.	Oregon (6)
DB	Aashari Crosswell	Jr.	Arizona State (6)
Second Team Special Teams
PK	Peyton Henry	Jr.	Washington (4)
P	Ben Griffiths	RSo.	USC (7)
RT	Demetric Felton	RSr.	UCLA (2)
RT	Britain Covey	Jr.	Utah (6)

=== Activism ===
On August 2, 2020, a few days after the Pac-12 announced a conference only season due to the COVID-19 pandemic, a group of 13 Pac-12 football players from 10 schools released a list of demands including health and safety protections, guaranteed medical coverage for players, elimination of excessive salaries for staff, end to racial injustice in sports and society, and a profit-sharing arrangement whereby 50% of the conference revenues will be distributed evenly among athletes. The players threatened to boycott practices and games unless the demands are met.

List of Pac-12 student-athlete activists
Player	Position	School
Treyjohn Butler	DB	Stanford
Jake Curhan	OL	Cal
Valentino Daltoso	OL	Cal
Joshua Drayden	DB	Cal
Nick Ford	OL	Utah
Jaydon Grant	DB	Oregon State
Elisha Guidry	DB	UCLA
Malik Hausman	DB	Arizona
Dallas Hobbs	DL	Washington State
Jevon Holland	DB	Oregon
Ty Jones	WR	Washington
Cody Shear	OL	Arizona State
Joe Tryon-Shoyinka	LB	Washington

== Head coaches ==
=== Coaching changes ===
There were three coaching change following the 2019 season, Karl Dorrell (Colorado), Jimmy Lake (Washington) and Nick Rolovich (Washington State).

=== Coaches ===
Note: Stats shown are before the beginning of the season.

Team	Head coach	Years at school	Overall record	Record at school	Pac–12 record
Arizona	Kevin Sumlin	3	95–58	9–15	6–12
Arizona State	Herm Edwards	3	15–11	15–11	9–9
California	Justin Wilcox	4	20–18	20–18	10–17
Colorado	Karl Dorrell	1	35-27	0–0	35-27
Oregon	Mario Cristobal	4	48–54	21–7	13–5
Oregon State	Jonathan Smith	3	7–17	7–17	5–13
Stanford	David Shaw	10	86–34	86–34	58–22
UCLA	Chip Kelly	3	53–24	7–17	7–11
USC	Clay Helton	7	40–22	40–22	31–12
Utah	Kyle Whittingham	16	131–63	131–63	42–39
Washington	Jimmy Lake	1	0–0	0–0	0–0
Washington State	Nick Rolovich	1	28–27	0–0	0–0

== Rankings ==
		Pre	Wk 2	Wk 3	Wk 4	Wk 5	Wk 6	Wk 7	Wk 8	Wk 9	Wk 10	Wk 11	Wk 12	Wk 13	Wk 14	Wk 15	Wk 16	Final
Arizona	AP																	
Arizona	C																	
Arizona	CFP	Not released																
Arizona State	AP	RV				RV	RV	RV	RV	RV	RV	RV						
Arizona State	C	RV				RV	RV	RV	RV	RV								
Arizona State	CFP	Not released																
California	AP	RV							RV	RV	RV							
California	C	RV				RV	RV	RV	RV	RV								
California	CFP	Not released																
Colorado	AP													RV	21		RV	
Colorado	C											RV		RV	22	RV	RV	
Colorado	CFP	Not released													21	25		
Oregon	AP	9			14	12	12	13	14	12	11	11	9	21			25	
Oregon	C	9				17	16	15	15	14	12	13	11	20	RV	RV	RV	
Oregon	CFP	Not released											15	23			25	
Oregon State	AP													RV				
Oregon State	C																	
Oregon State	CFP	Not released																
Stanford	AP																	
Stanford	C	RV				RV	RV	RV	RV									
Stanford	CFP	Not released																
UCLA	AP														RV			
UCLA	C																	
UCLA	CFP	Not released																
USC	AP	17			RV	RV	25	24	21	20	20	20	19	17	16	13	21	
USC	C	17				RV	24	23	20	20	20	19	18	16	15	13	19	
USC	CFP	Not released											18	20	15	13	17	
Utah	AP	22			RV	RV	RV	RV	RV	RV	RV	RV						
Utah	C	20				RV	RV	RV	RV	RV	RV	RV				RV	RV	
Utah	CFP	Not released																
Washington	AP	RV			RV	RV	RV	RV	RV	RV	RV	RV	RV	23	RV	RV	RV	
Washington	C	RV				RV	RV	RV				RV	RV	23	RV	RV	RV	
Washington	CFP	Not released												22				
Washington State	AP																	
Washington State	C	RV																
Washington State	CFP	Not released																

Legend
	Improvement in ranking
	Drop in ranking
	Not ranked previous week
	No change in ranking from previous week
RV	Received votes but were not ranked in Top 25 of poll
т	Tied with team above or below also with this symbol

== Schedules ==
Index to colors and formatting
Pac-12 member won
Pac-12 member lost
Pac-12 teams in **bold**

All times Pacific time. Pac-12 teams in bold.

Rankings reflect those of the AP poll for that week.

=== Regular season ===
The regular season was originally scheduled to begin on September 26, 2020, and end on December 5, 2020. The Pac-12 Championship Game was scheduled for December 18–19, 2020. It was announced on July 10, 2020 that all non-conference games would be canceled due to the COVID-19 pandemic.

==== Week 1 ====
Date	Time	Visiting team	Home team	Site	TV	Result	Attendance	Ref.
November 7	9:00 a.m.	Arizona State	No. 20 **USC**	LA Memorial Coliseum • Los Angeles, CA	FOX	**USC** 28–27	1	
November 7	12:30 p.m.	Arizona	**Utah**	Rice-Eccles Stadium • Salt Lake City, UT	ESPN2	No Contest		
November 7	4:00 p.m.	UCLA	**Colorado**	Folsom Field • Boulder, CO	ESPN2	**COLO** 48–42	554	
November 7	4:30 p.m.	Stanford	No. 12 **Oregon**	Autzen Stadium • Eugene, OR	ABC	**ORE** 35–14	0	
November 7	7:30 p.m.	Washington	**California**	California Memorial Stadium • Berkeley, CA	ESPN	No Contest		
November 7	7:30 p.m.	Washington State	**Oregon State**	Reser Stadium • Corvallis, OR	FS1	**WSU** 38–28	0	
^{#}Rankings from AP Poll released prior to game. All times are in Pacific Time.

==== Week 2 ====
Date	Time	Visiting team	Home team	Site	TV	Result	Attendance	Ref.
November 14	12:30 p.m.	**Colorado**	Stanford	Stanford Stadium • Stanford, CA	ESPN 2	**COL** 35–32	1	
November 14	12:30 p.m.	No. 20 **USC**	Arizona	Arizona Stadium • Tucson, AZ	FOX	**USC** 34–30	1	
November 14	4:00 p.m.	No. 11 **Oregon**	Washington State	Martin Stadium • Pullman, WA	FOX	**ORE** 43-29	0	
November 14	7:30 p.m.	**California**	Arizona State	Sun Devil Stadium • Tempe, AZ	ESPN2	No Contest		
November 13	7:30 p.m.	**Utah**	UCLA	Rose Bowl • Pasadena, CA	FOX	No Contest		
November 14	8:00 p.m.	**Oregon State**	Washington	Husky Stadium • Seattle, WA	FS1	**WASH** 27-21	294	
November 15	9:00 a.m.	**California**	UCLA	Rose Bowl • Pasadena, CA	FS1	**UCLA** 34-10	0	
^{#}Rankings from AP Poll released prior to game. All times are in Pacific Time.

==== Week 3 ====
Date	Time	Visiting team	Home team	Site	TV	Result	Attendance	Ref.
November 21	12:30 p.m.	**UCLA**	No. 11 **Oregon**	Autzen Stadium • Eugene, OR	ESPN2	**ORE** 38-35	0	
November 21	12:30 p.m.	**California**	**Oregon State**	Reser Stadium • Corvallis, OR	FS1	**OSU** 31-27	0	
November 21	5:00 p.m.	**Arizona**	**Washington**	Husky Stadium • Seattle, WA	FOX	**UW** 44-27	253	
November 21	7:00 p.m.	**Arizona State**	**Colorado**	Folsom Field • Boulder, CO	ESPN 2	No Contest		
November 21	7:30 p.m.	No. 20 **USC**	**Utah**	Rice-Eccles Stadium • Salt Lake City, UT	ESPN	**USC** 33-17	1	
November 21	7:30 p.m.	**Washington State**	**Stanford**	Stanford Stadium • Stanford, CA	FS1	No Contest		
^{#}Rankings from AP Poll released prior to game. All times are in Pacific Time.

==== Week 4 ====
Date	Time	Visiting team	Home team	Site	TV	Result	Attendance	Ref.
November 27	4:00 p.m.	No. 9 **Oregon**	**Oregon State**	Reser Stadium • Corvallis, OR (Civil War)	ESPN	**OSU** 41–38	0	
November 27	1:30 p.m.	**Stanford**	**California**	California Memorial Stadium • Berkeley, CA (123rd Big Game/Stanford Axe)	FOX	**CAL** 26–23	0	
November 27	7:30 p.m.	**Washington**	**Washington State**	Martin Stadium • Pullman, WA (Apple Cup)	ESPN	No Contest		
November 28	5:00 p.m.	**Arizona**	**UCLA**	Rose Bowl • Pasadena, CA	FOX	**UCLA** 27–10	0	
November 28	12:30 p.m.	**Colorado**	No. 19 **USC**	LA Memorial Coliseum • Los Angeles, CA	ABC	No Contest		
November 29	N/A	**Utah**	**Arizona State**	Sun Devil Stadium • Tempe, AZ	N/A	No Contest		
November 28	4:30 p.m.	**Utah**	**Washington**	Husky Stadium • Seattle, WA	ABC	**UW** 24–21	259	
November 28	2:00 p.m.	San Diego State	**Colorado**	Folsom Field • Boulder, CO	P12N	**W** 20–10	0	
^{#}Rankings from AP Poll released prior to game. All times are in Pacific Time.

==== Week 5 ====
Date	Time	Visiting team	Home team	Site	TV	Result	Attendance	Ref.
December 5	4:00 p.m.	**Colorado**	**Arizona**	Arizona Stadium • Tucson, AZ	FS1	**COLO** 24–13	0	
December 5	7:30 p.m.	**UCLA**	**Arizona State**	Sun Devil Stadium • Tempe, AZ	FS1	**UCLA** 25–18	0	
December 5	1:00 p.m.	**Stanford**	No. 23 **Washington**	Husky Stadium • Seattle, WA	FOX	**STAN** 31–26	278	
December 5	4:00 p.m.	No. 21 **Oregon**	**California**	California Memorial Stadium • Berkeley, CA	ESPN	**CAL** 21–17	0	
December 5	7:30 p.m.	**Oregon State**	**Utah**	Rice-Eccles Stadium • Salt Lake City, UT	ESPN	**UTAH** 30–24	0	
December 6	4:30 p.m.	**Washington State**	No. 17 **USC**	LA Memorial Coliseum • Los Angeles, CA	FS1	**USC** 38–13	1	
^{#}Rankings from AP Poll released prior to game. All times are in Pacific Time.

==== Week 6 ====
The game between Stanford and Oregon State was moved from Stanford to Corvallis due to a ban on contact sports in Santa Clara County.

Date	Time	Visiting team	Home team	Site	TV	Result	Attendance	Ref.
December 11	4:00 p.m.	**Arizona State**	**Arizona**	Arizona Stadium • Tucson, AZ (Territorial Cup)	ESPN	**ASU** 70-7	0	
December 12	9:00 a.m.	**Utah**	No. 21 **Colorado**	Folsom Field • Boulder, CO (Rumble in the Rockies)	FOX	**UTAH** 38-21	0	
December 12	7:30 p.m.	**California**	**Washington State**	Martin Stadium • Pullman, WA	FS1	No Contest		
December 12	7:30 p.m.	**Oregon State**	**Stanford**	Reser Stadium • Corvallis, OR	ESPNU	**Stanford** 27-24	0	
December 12	4:30 p.m.	No. 16 **USC**	**UCLA**	Rose Bowl • Pasadena, CA (Victory Bell)	ABC	**USC** 43-38	0	
December 12	1:00 p.m.	**Washington**	**Oregon**	Autzen Stadium • Eugene, OR	FOX	No Contest		
^{#}Rankings from AP Poll released prior to game. All times are in Pacific Time.

==== Week 7 ====
Date	Time	Visiting team	Home team	Site	TV	Result	Attendance	Ref.
December 18	5:00 p.m.	**Washington**	No. 13 **USC**	Memorial Coliseum • Los Angeles, CA (Pac-12 Championship)	FOX	No Contest		
December 18	5:00 p.m.	**Oregon**	No. 13 **USC**	Memorial Coliseum • Los Angeles, CA (Pac-12 Championship)	FOX	**ORE** 31-24	1	
December 19	10:30 a.m.	**Washington State**	**Utah**	Rice-Eccles Stadium • Salt Lake City, UT	FS1	**UTAH** 45-28	0	
December 19	5:00 p.m.	**Stanford**	**UCLA**	Rose Bowl • Pasadena, CA	ESPN2	**STAN** 48-47 ^{2OT}	0	
December 19	6:00 p.m.	TBD	**Colorado**	Folsom Field • Boulder, CO	FS1	No opponent scheduled		
December 19	7:30 p.m.	**Arizona State**	**Oregon State**	Reser Stadium • Corvallis, OR	ESPN	**ASU** 46-33	0	
December 19	N/A	**Arizona**	**California**	California Memorial Stadium • Berkeley, CA		No Contest		
^{#}Rankings from AP Poll released prior to game. All times are in Pacific Time.

=== Pac-12 Championship Game ===
The Pac-12 Championship Game, the conference's tenth championship game, will be played on December 18, 2020, at the home stadium of the division champion with the best record. It was planned to be contested by the winners of the North and South divisions. The remaining Pac-12 teams will play a series of seeded games during this week; each team will play against the cross-divisional opponent that finished in the same place in the standings. Washington, the North Division winner, was scheduled to play USC, the South Division winner, in the championship game, but COVID issues forced it back out, allowing the second-best team by record in the North, Oregon, to take their place instead.

Date	Time	Visiting team	Home team	Site	TV	Result	Attendance	Ref.
December 18	5:00 p.m.	**Washington**	No. 13 **USC**	Memorial Coliseum • Los Angeles, CA	FOX	No Contest		
December 18	5:00 p.m.	**Oregon**	No. 13 **USC**	Memorial Coliseum • Los Angeles, CA	FOX	**ORE** 31-24	1	
^{#}Rankings from AP Poll released prior to game. All times are in Pacific Time.

=== Canceled regular season games ===
The following non-conference games were canceled due to the COVID-19 pandemic:

Aug. 29

- Hawaii at Arizona
- New Mexico State at UCLA
- California at UNLV

Sep. 3

- Northern Arizona at Arizona State
- BYU at Utah
- Oregon State at Oklahoma State
- Washington State at Utah State

Sept. 5

- Portland State at Arizona
- USC vs. Alabama (at Arlington, TX)
- UCLA at Hawaii
- Colorado at Colorado State
- TCU at California
- William & Mary at Stanford
- North Dakota State at Oregon
- Michigan at Washington

Sept. 12

- Arizona State at UNLV
- New Mexico at USC
- Fresno State at Colorado
- Montana State at Utah
- Cal Poly at California
- Ohio State at Oregon
- Colorado State at Oregon State
- Sacramento State at Washington
- Houston at Washington State

Sept. 19

- Arizona at Texas Tech
- BYU at Arizona State
- UCLA at San Diego State
- Colorado at Texas A&M
- Utah at Wyoming
- Hawaii at Oregon
- Portland State at Oregon State
- Utah State at Washington
- Idaho at Washington State

Oct. 10

- Stanford at Notre Dame

Nov. 28

- Notre Dame at USC
- BYU at Stanford

== Postseason ==
=== Bowl games ===
Legend
Pac-12 win
Pac-12 loss

Bowl game	Date	Site	Television	Time (PST)	Pac-12 team	Opponent	Score	Attendance
Alamo Bowl	December 29	Alamodome • San Antonio, Texas	ESPN	6:00 p.m.	**Colorado**	No. 20 Texas	**L** 23–55	10,822
**New Year's Six Bowl**
Fiesta Bowl	January 2	State Farm Stadium • Glendale, Arizona	ESPN	1:00 p.m.	No. 25 **Oregon**	No. 10 Iowa State	**L** 17–34	0

Rankings are from CFP rankings. All times Pacific Time Zone. Pac-12 teams shown in bold.

=== Selection of teams ===
- **Bowl eligible: Arizona State, Colorado, Oregon, Stanford, USC, Utah, Washington**
- **Bowl-ineligible: Arizona, California, Oregon State, UCLA, Washington State**

Arizona State, Stanford, USC, and Washington declined to pursue bowl game opportunities. UCLA and Utah opted out of playing in a bowl before their final regular season games and with their eligibility still in doubt.

== Awards and honors ==
=== Player of the week honors ===
Week	Offensive			Defensive			Special Teams			Offensive line			Defensive line			Freshman		
Week	Player	Team	Position	Player	Team	Position	Player	Team	Position	Player	Team	Position	Player	Team	Position	Player	Team	Position
Week 1 (Nov. 9)	Jarek Broussard	Colorado	RB	Merlin Robertson	Arizona State	LB	Michael Turk	Arizona State	P	Ryan Walk	Oregon	G	Marlon Tuipulotu	USC	DT	Jayden de Laura	Washington State	QB
Week 2 (Nov. 16)	Sam Noyer	Colorado	QB	Nate Landman	Colorado	LB	Champ Flemings	Oregon State	WR/KR/PR	T. J. Bass	Oregon	G	Zion Tupuola-Fetui	Washington	LB	Ayden Hector	Washington State	DB
Week 3 (Nov. 23)	Jermar Jefferson	Oregon State	RB	Jordan Happle	Oregon	S	Jesiah Irish	Oregon State	WR	Luke Wattenberg	Washington	C	Zion Tupuola-Fetui (2)	Washington	LB	Dylan Morris	Washington	QB
Week 4 (Nov. 30)	Jermar Jefferson (2)	Oregon State	RB	Nate Landman (2)	Colorado	LB	Thomas Booker	Stanford	DE	Nathan Eldridge	Oregon State	C	Zion Tupuola-Fetui (3)	Washington	LB	Dylan Morris (2)	Washington	QB
Week 5 (Dec. 7)	Jarek Broussard (2)	Colorado	RB	Kuony Deng	California	LB	Jadon Redding	Utah	K	Drew Dalman	Stanford	LT	Tyler Johnson	Arizona State	DT	Ty Jordan	Utah	RB
Week 6 (Dec. 14)	Kedon Slovis	USC	QB	Talanoa Hufanga	USC	S	Jadon Redding (2)	Utah	K	Dohnovan West	Arizona State	G	Drake Jackson	USC	LB	Ty Jordan (2)	Utah	RB
Week 7	Simi Fehoko	Stanford	WR	Jamal Hill	Oregon	S	Will Shaffer	Arizona State	LB	Nick Ford	Utah	C	Kayvon Thibodeaux	Oregon	DE	Ty Jordan (3)	Utah	RB

=== Pac-12 Individual Awards ===
The following individuals received postseason honors as voted by the Pac-12 Conference football coaches at the end of the season

Award	Player	School
Offensive Player of the Year	Jarek Broussard	Colorado
Defensive Player of the Year	Talanoa Hufanga	USC
Offensive Freshman of the Year	Ty Jordan	Utah
Defensive Freshman of the Year	Noah Sewell	Oregon
Scholar Athlete of the Year		
Coach of the Year	Karl Dorrell	Colorado

=== All-conference teams ===
The following players earned All-Pac-12 honors. Any teams showing (_) following their name are indicating the number of All-Pac-12 Conference Honors awarded to that university for 1st team and 2nd team respectively.

First Team

Position	Player	Class	Team
First Team Offense
QB	Kedon Slovis	So.	USC
RB	Jarek Broussard	So.	Colorado
RB	Jermar Jefferson	Jr.	Oregon State
WR	Simi Fehoko	Jr.	Stanford
WR	Amon-Ra St. Brown	Jr.	USC (2)
TE	Cade Otton	Jr.	Washington
OL	Drew Dalman	Sr.	Stanford (2)
OL	Nathan Eldridge	Sr.	Oregon State (2)
OL	Nick Ford	Jr.	Utah
OL	Jaxson Kirkland	Jr.	Washington (2)
OL	Alijah Vera-Tucker	Jr.	USC (3)
OL	Dohnovan West	So.	ASU
First Team Defense
DL	Osa Odighizuwa	Sr.	UCLA
DL	Kayvon Thibodeaux	So.	Oregon
DL	Marlon Tuipulotu	Jr.	USC (4)
DL	Zion Tupuola-Fetui	So.	Washington (3)
LB	Nate Landman†	Sr.	Colorado (2)
LB	Devin Lloyd	Jr.	Utah (2)
LB	Avery Roberts	Jr.	Oregon State (3)
DB	Camryn Bynum	Sr.	California
DB	Talanoa Hufanga	Jr.	USC (5)
DB	Elijah Molden†	Sr.	Washington (4)
DB	Mykael Wright	So.	Oregon (2)
First Team Special Teams
PK	Jadon Redding	So.	Utah (3)
P	Michael Turk†	Jr.	ASU (2)
RT	Britain Covey	Sr.	Utah (4)
AP/ST	Thomas Booker	Jr.	Stanford (3)

Second Team

Position	Player	Class	Team
Second Team Offense
QB	Sam Noyer	Sr.	Colorado (3)
QB	Dorian Thompson-Robinson	Jr.	UCLA (2)
RB	Demetric Felton	Sr.	UCLA (3)
RB	Ty Jordan	Fr.	Utah (5)
WR	Drake London	So.	USC (6)
WR	Tyler Vaughns	Sr.	USC (7)
TE	Greg Dulcich	So.	UCLA (4)
TE	Brant Kuithe	Jr.	Utah (6)
OL	Alex Forsyth	Jr.	Oregon (3)
OL	Joshua Gray	Fr.	Oregon State (4)
OL	Sataoa Laumea	Fr.	Utah (7)
OL	Abraham Lucas	Jr.	Washington State
OL	Will Sherman	Jr.	Colorado (4)
Second Team Defense
DL	Thomas Booker	Jr.	Stanford (4)
DL	Mustafa Johnson	Sr.	Colorado (5)
DL	Tyler Johnson	Jr.	ASU (3)
DL	Mika Tafua	Jr.	Utah (8)
LB	Cameron Goode	Sr.	California (2)
LB	Drake Jackson	So.	USC (8)
LB	Edefuan Ulofoshio	So.	Washington (5)
DB	Deommodore Lenoir	Sr.	Oregon (4)
DB	Chase Lucas	Sr.	ASU (4)
DB	Trent McDuffie	So.	Washington (6)
DB	Chris Steele	So.	USC (9)
Second Team Special Teams
PK	Jet Toner	Sr.	Stanford (5)
P	Oscar Draguicevich	Sr.	Washington State (2)
RT	D.J. Taylor	Fr.	ASU (5)
AP/ST	Jaylon Jackson	Jr.	Colorado (6)

† Two-time first team selection

Honorable mentions

- ARIZONA: RB Gary Brightwell, Sr.; DB Lorenzo Burns, Sr.; K Lucas Havrisik, Sr.; DL Roy Lopez, Sr.; LB Anthony Pandy, Sr.
- ARIZONA STATE: OL Kellen Diesch, Grad.; DB Evan Fields, Sr.; DL Jermayne Lole, Jr.; LB Kyle Soelle, Jr.; RB Rachaad White, Jr.
- CALIFORNIA: WR Kekoa Crawford, Sr.; OL Jake Curhan, Sr.; LB Kuony Deng, Sr.; DB Josh Drayden, Sr.; DL Brett Johnson, So.; DL Zeandae Johnson, Sr.; WR/RS Nikko Remigio, Jr.; OL Michael Saffell, Sr.; TE Jake Tonges, Jr.
- COLORADO: OL Frank Fillip, So.; DL Terrance Lang, Jr.; DB Isaiah Lewis, Jr.; OL Casey Roddick, So.; RS Dimitri Stanley, So.; LB Carson Wells, Jr.
- OREGON: OL Malaesala Aumavae-Laulu, Jr.; OL T. J. Bass, Jr.; RB Travis Dye, Jr.; DL Austin Faoliu, Sr.; DB Jamal Hill, So.; WR Johnny Johnson III, Sr.; LB Noah Sewell, Fr.; LB Isaac Slade-Matautia, Jr.
- OREGON STATE: RS Champ Flemings, Jr.; DB Jaydon Grant, Jr.; DL Isaac Hodgins, Jr.; AP/ST Jesiah Irish, So.; OL Nous Keobounnam, Sr.; TE Teagan Quitoriano, Jr.; LB Hamilcar Rashed Jr., R-Sr.; DL Simon Sandberg, Jr.; LB Omar Speights, So.; DB Nahshon Wright, Jr.
- STANFORD: DB Malik Antoine, Sr.; RB Houston Heimuli, Sr.; RB Austin Jones, So.; DB Kyu Blu Kelly, So.; QB Davis Mills, Sr.; RS Nathaniel Peat, So.; LB Curtis Robinson, Sr.; OL Walter Rouse, So.; P Ryan Sanborn, So.; DL Thomas Schaffer, Sr.; WR Michael Wilson, Jr.
- UCLA: DB Stephan Blaylock, Jr.; LB Caleb Johnson, Jr.; DB Qwuantrezz Knight, Sr.; OL Sam Marrazzo, Jr.; WR/RS Kyle Philips, So.
- USC: DL Nick Figueroa, Jr.; DB Olaijah Griffin, Jr.; P Ben Griffiths, So.; K Parker Lewis, Fr.; OL Jalen McKenzie, Jr.; OL Brett Neilon, Jr.; DB Isaiah Pola-Mao, Jr.
- UTAH: WR Britain Covey, Jr.; DB JaTravis Broughton, So.; ST Keegan Markgraf, Sr.; LB Nephi Sewell, Jr.
- WASHINGTON: OL Henry Bainivalu, Jr.; OL Victor Curne, So.; AP/ST Kyler Gordon, So.; QB Dylan Morris, R-Fr.; OL Luke Wattenberg, Sr.
- WASHINGTON STATE: WR Renard Bell, Sr.; OL Brian Greene, Jr.; WR Travell Harris, Jr.; DB Daniel Isom, Sr.; DL Brennan Jackson, R-So.; K Blake Mazza, Jr.; OL Liam Ryan, Sr.; DB Jaylen Watson, R-Jr.; LB Jahad Woods, Sr.

=== All-Americans ===
Currently, the NCAA compiles consensus all-America teams in the sports of Division I-FBS football and Division I men's basketball using a point system computed from All-America teams named by coaches associations or media sources. The system consists of three points for a first-team honor, two points for second-team honor, and one point for third-team honor. Honorable mention and fourth team or lower recognitions are not accorded any points. College Football All-American consensus teams are compiled by position and the player accumulating the most points at each position is named first team consensus all-American. Currently, the NCAA recognizes All-Americans selected by the AP, AFCA, FWAA, TSN, and the WCFF to determine Consensus and Unanimous All-Americans. Any player named to the First Team by all five of the NCAA-recognized selectors is deemed a Unanimous All-American.

Position	Player	School	Selector	Unanimous	Consensus
First Team All-Americans
DB	Talanoa Hufanga	USC	AP, TSN, WCFF		✓

Position	Player	School	Selector	Unanimous	Consensus
Second Team All-Americans

Position	Player	School	Selector	Unanimous	Consensus
Third Team All-Americans
DL	Zion Tupuola-Fetui	Washington	AP		

*AFCA All-America Team (AFCA)
*Walter Camp All-America Team
*AP All-America teams
*Sporting News All-America Team
*Football Writers Association of America All-America Team (FWAA)
*Sports Illustrated All-America Team
*Report All-America Team (BR)
*College Football News All-America Team (CFN)
*ESPN All-America Team
*CBS Sports All-America Team
*Athlon Sports All-America Team (Athlon)
*The Athletic All-America Team
*USA Today All-America Team

=== National award winners ===
2020 College Football Award Winners-->

== Home game attendance ==
On September 24, 2020, the Pac–12 announced that it would only allow student-athlete families to attend football games this season, subject to local public health authority approval and in accordance with NCAA guidelines. Each individual university will determine what will be allowed in terms of family member attendance on that basis. The conference is keeping track of attendance, although the accuracy is in question. Each team will play three home and three road games, with the possibility of hosting a fourth home game based on where each team finishes within their division, with the top seed from each division playing in the Pac-12 Title Game in Las Vegas.

Team	Stadium	Capacity	Game 1	Game 2	Game 3	Game 4	Total	Average	% of Capacity
Arizona	Arizona Stadium	55,675	1†	0	0	—	1	0.33	0.00059%
Arizona State	Sun Devil Stadium	53,599	0	—	—	—	0	0	0%
California	California Memorial Stadium	62,467	0	0	—	—	0	0	0%
Colorado	Folsom Field	50,183	554†	0	0	—	554	185	0.36%
Oregon	Autzen Stadium	54,000	1†	0	—	—	1	0.5	0.00092%
Oregon State	Reser Stadium	43,154	0	0	0	—	0	0	0%
Stanford	Stanford Stadium	50,424	1†	—	—	—	1	1	0.0019%
UCLA	Rose Bowl	80,616	0	0	0	—	0	0	0%
USC	Los Angeles Memorial Coliseum	76,750	1†	1†	—	—	2	1	0.0013%
Utah	Rice-Eccles Stadium	45,807	1†	0	0	—	1	0.33	0.0007%
Washington	Husky Stadium	70,083	294†	253	259	278	1084	271	0.38%
Washington State	Martin Stadium	32,952	0	—	—	—	0	0	0%

Bold – Exceed capacity
†Season High

== NFL draft ==
The following list includes all Pac–12 Players who were drafted in the 2021 NFL draft.

Player	Position	School	Draft Round	Round Pick	Overall Pick	Team
Penei Sewell	OT	Oregon	1	7	7	Detroit Lions
Alijah Vera-Tucker	OG	USC	1	14	14	New York Jets
Joe Tryon-Shoyinka	OLB	Washington	1	32	32	Tampa Bay Buccaneers
Jevon Holland	S	Oregon	2	4	36	Miami Dolphins
Levi Onwuzurike	DT	Washington	2	9	41	Detroit Lions
Walker Little	OT	Stanford	2	13	45	Jacksonville Jaguars
Davis Mills	QB	Stanford	3	3	67	Houston Texans
Osa Odighizuwa	DT	UCLA	3	11	75	Dallas Cowboys
Paulson Adebo	CB	Stanford	3	12	76	New Orleans Saints
Nahshon Wright	CB	Oregon State	3	35	99	Dallas Cowboys
Elijah Molden	CB	Washington	3	36	100	Tennessee Titans
Jay Tufele	DT	USC	4	1	106	Jacksonville Jaguars
Amon-Ra St. Brown	WR	USC	4	7	112	Detroit Lions
Drew Dalman	C	Stanford	4	9	114	Atlanta Falcons
Camryn Bynum	RB	California	4	20	125	Minnesota Vikings
Keith Taylor	CB	Washington	5	22	166	Carolina Panthers
Deommodore Lenoir	CB	Oregon	5	28	172	San Francisco 49ers
Simi Fehoko	WR	Stanford	5	35	179	Dallas Cowboys
Talanoa Hufanga	S	USC	5	36	180	San Francisco 49ers
Frank Darby	WR	Arizona State	6	3	187	Atlanta Falcons
Marlon Tuipulotu	DT	USC	6	5	189	Philadelphia Eagles
Roy Lopez	DT	Arizona	6	11	195	Houston Texans
Gary Brightwell	RB	Arizona	6	12	196	New York Giants
Will Sherman	OT	Colorado	6	13	197	New England Patriots
Demetric Felton	RB	UCLA	6	27	211	Cleveland Browns
Brady Breeze	S	Oregon	6	31	215	Tennessee Titans
Thomas Graham Jr.	CB	Oregon	6	44	228	Chicago Bears
Jermar Jefferson	RB	Oregon State	7	29	257	Detroit Lions

=== Total picks by school ===
Team	Round 1	Round 2	Round 3	Round 4	Round 5	Round 6	Round 7	Total
Arizona	0	0	0	0	0	2	0	2
Arizona State	0	0	0	0	0	1	0	1
California	0	0	0	1	0	0	0	1
Colorado	0	0	0	0	0	1	0	1
Oregon	1	1	0	0	1	2	0	5
Oregon State	0	0	1	0	0	0	1	2
Stanford	0	1	2	1	1	0	0	5
UCLA	0	0	1	0	0	1	0	2
USC	1	0	0	2	1	1	0	5
Utah	0	0	0	0	0	0	0	0
Washington	1	1	1	0	1	0	0	4
Washington State	0	0	0	0	0	0	0	0
Total	3	3	5	4	4	8	1	28
