= Ash Creek (Polk County, Oregon) =

Stream in Oregon, United States of America

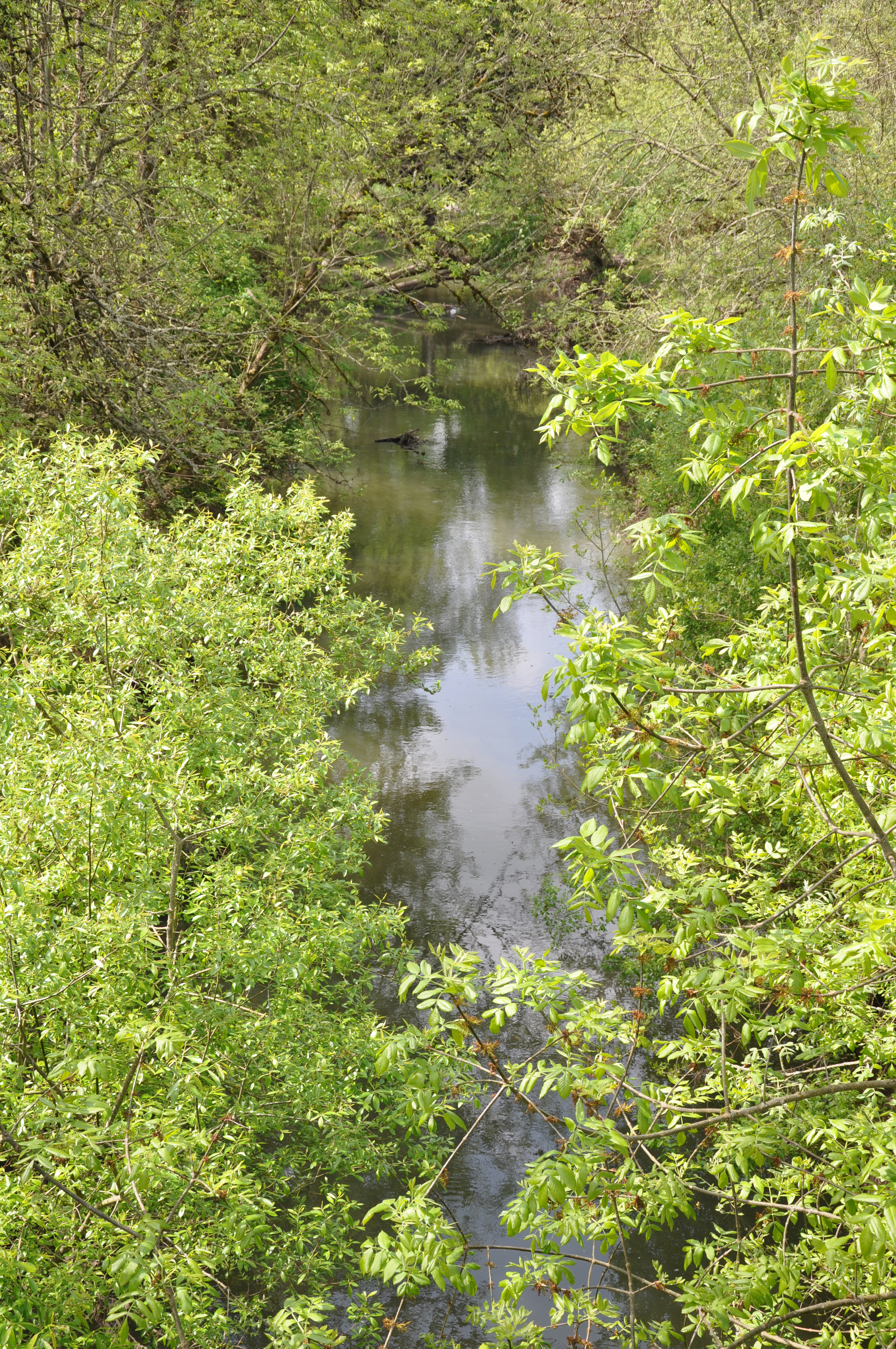
- Ash Creek in Independence

- Location of Ash Creek in Oregon

Location
- Country: United States
- State: Oregon
- County: Polk

Physical characteristics
- Source: confluence of Middle Fork Ash Creek and North Fork Ash Creek
  - location: northeast of Monmouth
  - coordinates: 44°51′32″N 123°13′08″W
  - elevation: 176 ft (54 m)
- Mouth: Willamette River
  - location: Independence
  - coordinates: 44°51′19″N 123°10′50″W
  - elevation: 135 ft (41 m)
- Basin size: 36 sq mi (93 km^{2})

Ash Creek is a short stream in Polk County, in the U.S. state of Oregon. Formed by the merger of its north and middle forks near Monmouth, it flows generally east to meet the Willamette River at Independence. The creek passes under Oregon Route 51 just before entering the river. The creek's mouth is about 95 miles (153 km) upstream of the Willamette's confluence with the Columbia River.

North Fork Ash Creek begins at the eastern edge of the Central Oregon Coast Range near Dallas at 44°54′35″N 123°21′44″W and flows generally southeast to meet the Middle Fork. Middle Fork Ash Creek begins at 44°53′26″N 123°17′37″W near Mount Pisgah and flows generally east. Both forks pass under Oregon Route 99W shortly before they merge to form the main stem.

Ash Creek is joined by a third fork, South Fork Ash Creek, in Independence. The South Fork begins at 44°52′36″N 123°18′28″W slightly south of the Middle Fork and flows generally east to meet the main stem at 44°51′13″N 123°11′36″W The South Fork passes under Route 99W south of Monmouth and under Route 51 in Independence.

None of the three forks has a named tributary. Before alterations by settlers in the 19th century, the basin was a "boggy, 'braided' marsh with many small creeks spilling into Ash Creek" and the river. European-Americans drained and leveled wetlands and riparian zones for farming, logging, housing, and urban development.

== See also ==
- List of rivers of Oregon
