= Greg Craven (teacher) =

American teacher and writer

Greg Craven is an American high school science teacher and climate change author. The creator of a 2007 viral video on YouTube, he is the author of the 2009 book What's the Worst That Could Happen?: A Rational Response to the Climate Change Debate.

== Early life and education ==
Craven grew up in Silverton, Oregon. He earned a bachelor's degree from the University of Puget Sound in Tacoma, Washington, studying Asian studies and computer science.

== Career ==
After graduating from college, Craven worked as a software engineer, traveled in Asia, and took graduate science courses at the University of Washington in Seattle.

In 2007, when he was a science teacher at Central High School in Independence, Oregon, Craven posted the nine and one-half minute The Most Terrifying Video You'll Ever See on YouTube. The video presented a simplified version of risk management using a 2x2 grid to sketch out possible scenarios based on: a) whether we choose to take action or not, and b) whether global warming turns out to be a threat or not. Using the grid, Craven concluded that taking action to combat climate change was the better choice, given the relative risks.

In the first six months online it garnered four million hits, and prompted Craven to spend six weeks creating 44 follow up videos totaling over seven hours detailing specifics of risk management applied to climate change. Craven's conclusion was that "the risk of not acting far outweighs the risk of acting." Craven was the focus of some media attention, was named "Featured Teacher" by WIRED Science, and was opposed by climate change denialists. In 2009, Craven published the book What's the Worst That Could Happen?: A Rational Response to the Climate Change Debate.

At the annual Fall Meeting of the American Geophysical Union (AGU) in 2010, Craven delivered a speech (and subsequent comments during a panel discussion) exhorting the climate science community to become personally involved in the public debate over climate change. Craven's comments caused some negative attention in denialist climate blogs, which argued that Craven was "the face of the 'New AGU.'" This prompted Craven to publish a clarification taking personal responsibility and emphasizing that his remarks were in no way associated with the AGU organization or its official view.

== Publications ==
- What's the Worst That Could Happen?: A Rational Response to the Climate Change Debate, Perigee Trade, 2009; ISBN 978-0-399-53501-7
