= John Clem Clarke =

American painter (1937–2021)

- Born: June 6, 1937; Bend, Oregon, U.S.
- Died: June 5, 2021 (aged 83); Keizer, Oregon, U.S.
- Education: Oregon State University; University of Oregon (B.F.A.)
- Known for: Painting; Graphic design
- Movement: Pop art
- Spouse: Jane Purucker (m. 1979; div. 2003)
- Children: 1

John Clem Clarke (June 6, 1937 – June 5, 2021) was an American painter and graphic artist who was active in the SoHo art scene during the 1970s.

== Early life ==
Clarke was born in Bend, Oregon to Wilma (née Owen) and Eugene Clarke, both of whom were school teachers. He was an only child and grew up a rural region of the Willamette Valley. His father later became a farmer who grew wheat and rye and also tended to sheep.

Attending Central High School in Independence, Oregon, he played football and became an all-state fullback, later earning a football scholarship to Oregon State University. At the 1957 Rose Bowl, he was the kicker for Oregon State.

Clarke later transferred to the University of Oregon where he took up art classes, graduating with a bachelor of fine arts degree in 1960.

== Career ==
After graduating, Clarke travelled Europe before settling in New York City where he eventually bought loft in the neighborhood of SoHo and an art studio in Greenwich Village.

Clarke became known for his reinterpretations of famous paintings. Using a projector, he broke down images of those paintings into stencils and used sponges or homemade spray-paint cans to paint on a canvas. His works hang in a number of museums, including the Museum of Modern Art and the Metropolitan Museum of Art.

His works were featured in the 1973 Whitney Biennial, the first biennial contemporary art exhibition held by the Whitney Museum of American Art.

David L. Shirley, art critic for The New York Times, praised his works, writing: "One of my favorite artists in the show is John Clem Clarke, who in the last decade has betrayed his own romantic interest in the past by interpreting established masterpieces in a very individual way. In the work on view he gives us his point of view of a David canvas of a young girl, which he covers with graffiti‐like marks and daubs of Expressionist paint in incandescent colors. He manages to do everything but cover up the David image, but does not offend it. Mr. Clarke magically merges the past and the present."

Clarke continued to paint and work until 2018 when he retired due to dementia.

== Personal life ==
Clarke married Jane Dee Purucker in 1979. She had previously been his studio assistant and was a sorority sister of Laura Bush, later first lady of the United States. The couple had one child together, a daughter named Trillion. They divorced in 2003; Jane Clarke remarried in 2008, to Baseball Hall of Fame pitcher Sandy Koufax.

After years of ill-health, he moved into a nursing home in Keizer, Oregon, where he died on June 5, 2021, a day before his 84th birthday. He was survived by his daughter and two grandchildren (a third grandchild predeceased him).
