= Monmouth, Oregon =

- City
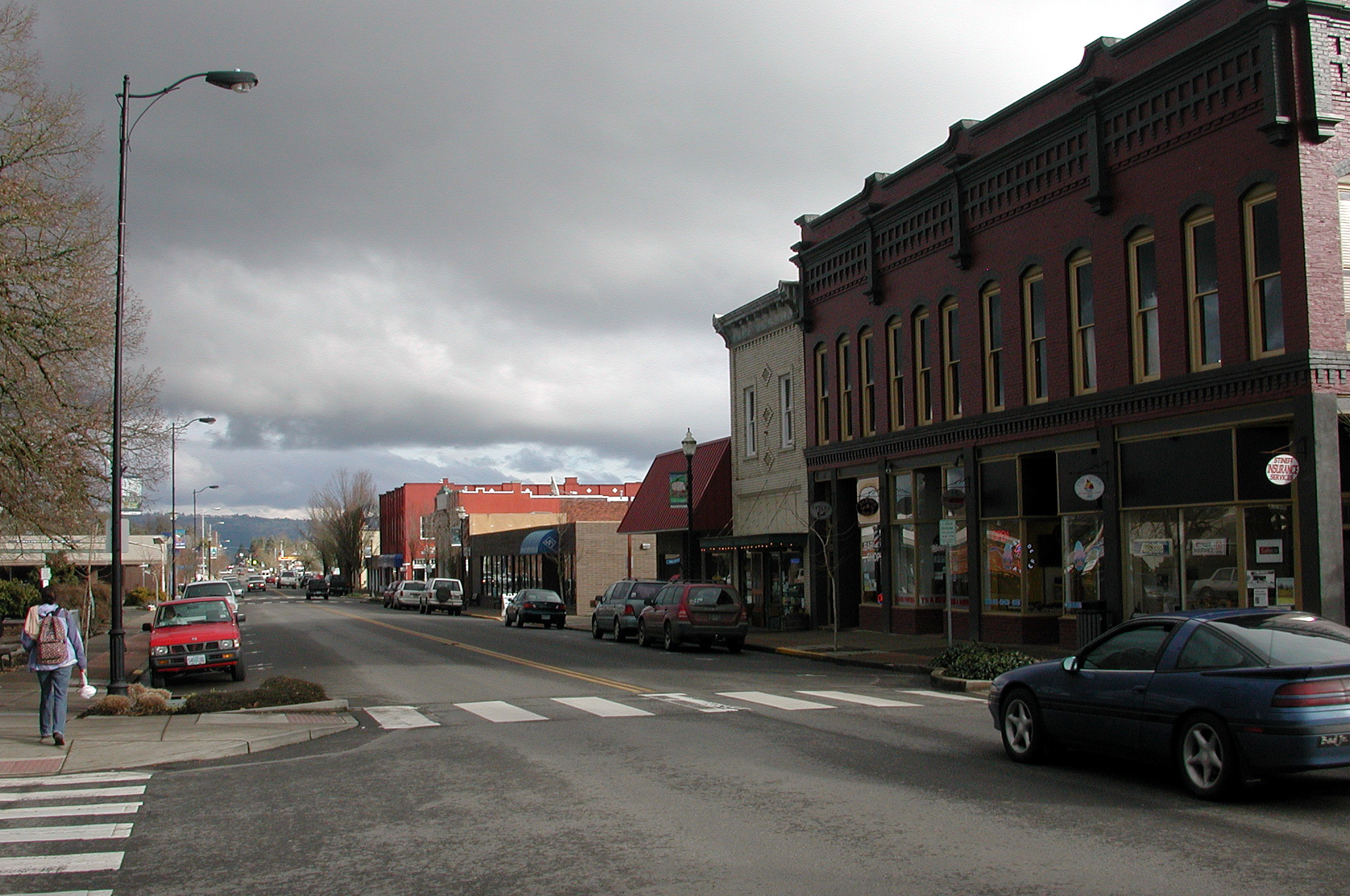
- Main Street looking east

- Location in Oregon

- Location in the United States
- Coordinates: 44°51′03″N 123°13′42″W
- Country: United States
- State: Oregon
- County: Polk
- Incorporated: 1859

Government
  - Mayor: Cecelia Koontz

Area
  - Total: 2.33 sq mi (6.04 km^{2})
  - Land: 2.25 sq mi (5.82 km^{2})
  - Water: 0.081 sq mi (0.21 km^{2})
- Elevation: 207 ft (63 m)

Population (2020)
  - Total: 11,110
  - Density: 4,940.6/sq mi (1,907.59/km^{2})
- Time zone: UTC-8 (Pacific)
  - Summer (DST): UTC-7 (Pacific)
- ZIP code: 97361
- Area code: 503
- FIPS code: 41-49550
- GNIS feature ID: 2411134
- Website: www.ci.monmouth.or.us

Monmouth (/ˈmɒnməθ/) is a city of Polk County in the U.S. state of Oregon. It was named after Monmouth, Illinois, the origin of its earliest settlers. The population is 11,110 as of the 2020 Census; and Monmouth is part of the Salem Metropolitan Statistical Area. The city is home to Western Oregon University. The city’s first public library, Monmouth Public Library, opened in 1934.

== History ==
Monmouth was settled in 1853 by a group of pioneers who allocated 640 acres (2.6 km^{2}) to build both a city and a "college under the auspices of the Christian Church", and proceeds from the sale of these lands were used to found Monmouth University, currently known as Western Oregon University. For decades, Monmouth was a dry town that banned the sale of alcoholic beverages in supermarkets, restaurants and bars. Monmouth's status as the last dry town in Oregon was ended by a popular vote in the November 2002 election.

=== Prohibition ===
Monmouth was settled by Elijah Davidson and his family. Originally an elder of the Christian Church of Cameron (Monmouth, Illinois), Davidson was a devout advocate of prohibition. In 1850, sixty-seven-year-old Elijah Davidson and his family set out for Oregon Territory. By 1854, more than a dozen additional church of Christ families from Monmouth, many of them related to each other or to Davidson, had joined him. In February 1859, Davidson and other trustees efforts to prohibit the importation, exportation, sale, and consumption of alcohol in Monmouth became a reality. One of the main arguments Davidson and his fellow religious supporters used to push prohibition legislation was, "to enable them to suppress and prevent nuisances, to render the possession of life and property more secure, [and] to enable them to improve and embellish the streets of the town."

Despite the efforts of certain merchants to repeal prohibition in Monmouth throughout its history, their efforts proved fruitless. What was most important to the local religious community was to keep prohibition for the betterment of the social order of Monmouth. Although opponents raised religious, moral, economic, and quality-of-life arguments similar to those preached during the nineteenth century, they also brought two new arguments to center stage: the historic nature of Monmouth's prohibition and the uniqueness that local prohibition brought to the town.

Eventually support for the prohibition ordinance started to wear thin throughout the community of Monmouth. Although die-hard supporters of prohibition continued to fight the inevitable, there were signs that it was starting to become more and more detrimental to the social and economic aspects of the community. Some claim that prohibition had reduced property values, others that it restricted development of the business sector in town. Opponents of repeal brought forth many arguments for staying dry, including initiating one rumor that the land donated so long ago for the site of the university would revert to the heirs of the donors if the ordinance was repealed, resulting in a huge cost to the state to repurchase it.

After failing by a nearly 5 to 1 margin in the early 1970s, repeal was passed by the voters in November 2002, and Monmouth ended its long tenure as the last dry town on the west coast.

== Geography ==
Monmouth is about 12 miles (19 km) west of Salem on Oregon Route 99W. It lies in the Ash Creek watershed, slightly west of the Willamette River.

According to the United States Census Bureau, the city has a total area of 2.24 square miles (5.80 km^{2}), all of it land.

== Demographics ==
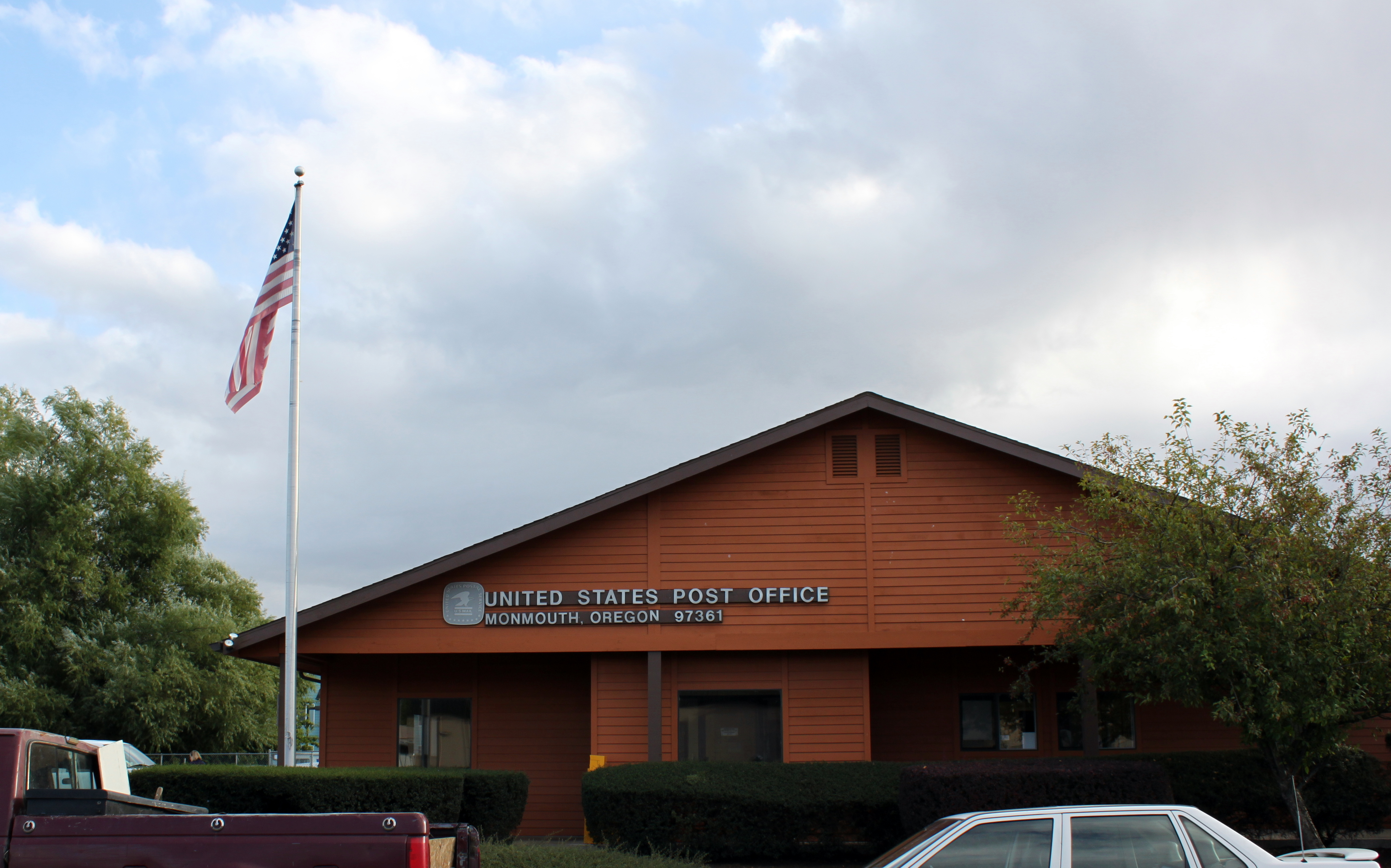
Post office in Monmouth

Historical population
Census	Pop.	Note	%±
1880	267		—
1900	606		—
1910	493		−18.6%
1920	582		18.1%
1930	906		55.7%
1940	965		6.5%
1950	1,956		102.7%
1960	2,229		14.0%
1970	5,237		134.9%
1980	5,594		6.8%
1990	6,288		12.4%
2000	7,741		23.1%
2010	9,534		23.2%
2020	11,110		16.5%
Sources: U.S. Decennial Census 2020

=== 2020 census ===
As of the 2020 census, Monmouth had a population of 11,110 and a median age of 26.2 years. 20.4% of residents were under the age of 18 and 12.7% of residents were 65 years of age or older. For every 100 females there were 87.1 males, and for every 100 females age 18 and over there were 83.1 males age 18 and over.

98.7% of residents lived in urban areas, while 1.3% lived in rural areas.

There were 3,645 households in Monmouth, of which 31.9% had children under the age of 18 living in them. Of all households, 43.2% were married-couple households, 17.5% were households with a male householder and no spouse or partner present, and 29.1% were households with a female householder and no spouse or partner present. About 23.0% of all households were made up of individuals and 8.3% had someone living alone who was 65 years of age or older.

There were 3,932 housing units, of which 7.3% were vacant. Among occupied housing units, 48.0% were owner-occupied and 52.0% were renter-occupied. The homeowner vacancy rate was 0.7% and the rental vacancy rate was 6.7%.

Racial composition as of the 2020 census
Race	Number	Percent
White	8,330	75.0%
Black or African American	129	1.2%
American Indian and Alaska Native	144	1.3%
Asian	293	2.6%
Native Hawaiian and Other Pacific Islander	95	0.9%
Some other race	829	7.5%
Two or more races	1,290	11.6%
Hispanic or Latino (of any race)	2,080	18.7%

=== 2010 census ===
As of the census of 2010, there were 9,534 people, 3,247 households, and 1,769 families living in the city. The population density was 4,256.3 inhabitants per square mile (1,643.4/km^{2}). There were 3,450 housing units at an average density of 1,540.2 per square mile (594.7/km^{2}). The racial makeup of the city was 82.8% White, 1.1% African American, 1.5% Native American, 3.3% Asian, 0.6% Pacific Islander, 6.6% from other races, and 4.1% from two or more races. Hispanic or Latino of any race were 13.4% of the population.

There were 3,247 households, of which 26.8% had children under the age of 18 living with them, 41.8% were married couples living together, 9.4% had a female householder with no husband present, 3.3% had a male householder with no wife present, and 45.5% were non-families. 23.9% of all households were made up of individuals, and 7.5% had someone living alone who was 65 years of age or older. The average household size was 2.52 and the average family size was 3.07.

The median age in the city was 23.7 years. 18.2% of residents were under the age of 18; 34.9% were between the ages of 18 and 24; 20.8% were from 25 to 44; 16.8% were from 45 to 64; and 9.4% were 65 years of age or older. The gender makeup of the city was 47.9% male and 52.1% female.

=== 2000 census ===
As of the census of 2000, there were 7,741 people, 2,757 households, and 1,488 families living in the city. The population density was 4,004.3 people per square mile (1,546.1 people/km^{2}). There were 2,934 housing units at an average density of 1,517.7 per square mile (586.0/km^{2}). The racial makeup of the city was 85.67% White, 0.92% African American, 1.05% Native American, 2.04% Asian, 0.74% Pacific Islander, 6.21% from other races, and 3.37% from two or more races. Hispanic or Latino of any race were 9.73% of the population.

There were 2,757 households, out of which 26.6% had children under the age of 18 living with them, 41.7% were married couples living together, 9.4% had a female householder with no husband present, and 46.0% were non-families. 24.4% of all households were made up of individuals, and 7.5% had someone living alone who was 65 years of age or older. The average household size was 2.50 and the average family size was 3.03.

In the city, the population was spread out, with 19.5% under the age of 18, 35.9% from 18 to 24, 21.2% from 25 to 44, 14.5% from 45 to 64, and 8.9% who were 65 years of age or older. The median age was 23 years. For every 100 females, there were 86.9 males. For every 100 females age 18 and over, there were 81.3 males.

The median income for a household in the city was $32,256, and the median income for a family was $48,600. Males had a median income of $33,500 versus $25,185 for females. The per capita income for the city was $14,474. About 7.1% of families and 24.6% of the population were below the poverty line, including 14.1% of those under age 18 and 5.6% of those age 65 or over.

== Education ==
Monmouth is served by the Central School District and is the home of Western Oregon University. Ash Creek Elementary School and Monmouth Elementary School are located in Monmouth, while Independence Elementary School, Talmadge Middle School and Central High School are located in the nearby city of Independence.

== See also ==
- Bethel, Polk County, Oregon
