= Suver, Oregon =

Unincorporated community in the state of Oregon, United States

Coordinates: 44°44′34″N 123°12′26″W

Suver is an unincorporated community in Polk County, Oregon, United States. It is located about 10 miles north of Corvallis and about 8 miles south of Monmouth, 1 mile east of Oregon Route 99W.

== History ==
Joseph Wellington Suver settled on a donation land claim near Suver in 1845. Suver, the son of John Suver and Catherine (Hanes) Suver, was born in 1814 in Berkeley County, Virginia. When the Oregon & California Railroad was being built through the area in 1880, Joseph Suver bought the present-day site of Suver from his brother-in-law, George W. Pyburn. The town of Suver was platted in 1881. The railroad station on what became the Southern Pacific Railroad line through the community was named Suvers. Another name for the railroad station was Soap Creek. Suver post office was established in 1881 with Sam Cohen as the first postmaster; it ran until 1935. Suver grew to include a store, a sawmill, two warehouses, a grain elevator, a dance hall, a train depot, a blacksmith shop, a shoe repair shop, and several residences by the mid-1890s. Suver school was built in 1895. As of 1915, Suver had a church and its population was 25.

The community served as a rural shipping facility and community center for the surrounding area until the mid-1920s, when the completion of Oregon Route 99W caused the decline of shipping by rail and thus the decline of the town. The warehouses, school, and several homes remained for years after the town's heyday. Suver became known as "Old Suver", which may be confused with "New Suver" or Suver Junction, a locale where Suver Road forms a crossroads with Oregon Route 99W a mile west of Suver. The store building currently located at Suver Junction was moved from Suver in 1935, and during World War II was the closest privately operated (Earl E. and Celena M. Conkey) store to thousands of men at Camp Adair. The store was built in 1905 and owned by Fred Strum. As of 1990, Suver was the site of a grain elevator and a rural volunteer fire station; the grain elevator remains today, and the fire station has closed.
