= Lewisville, Oregon =

Unincorporated community in the state of Oregon, United States

- Unincorporated community
- Location within Oregon Location within the United States
- Coordinates: 44°46′41″N 123°20′42″W
- Country: United States
- State: Oregon
- County: Polk
- Elevation: 272 ft (83 m)
- Time zone: UTC-8 (Pacific (PST))
  - Summer (DST): UTC-7 (PDT)
- ZIP code: 97361
- Area codes: 503 and 971
- GNIS feature ID: 1163101

Lewisville is an unincorporated community in Polk County, Oregon, United States, named for 1845 pioneer David R. Lewis. Its post office opened in 1868 and closed in 1905. Nothing remains of the community.
