= Salt Creek, Oregon =

Unincorporated community in the state of Oregon, United States

Coordinates: 44.995672°N 123.352883°W

Salt Creek is an unincorporated historic community in Polk County, Oregon, United States on Oregon Route 22 about six miles northwest of Dallas. As an early European American settlement of the Oregon Country, the cemetery at Salt Creek has graves dating back to 1847. Salt Creek, a tributary of the South Yamhill River, was named by early settlers for the salt licks found on its banks. The Salt Creek post office, named after the creek, was established in 1852 and closed in 1903. James B. Riggs, who arrived in Oregon via the Oregon Trail and the Meek Cutoff in 1845, was the first postmaster. Riggs previously been the first postmaster of Yoncalla, followed by Jesse Applegate.

Salt Creek is where Jesse, Lindsay, and Charles Applegate first settled after arriving in Oregon. James B. Riggs was their neighbor.
