= Crowley, Polk County, Oregon =

Unincorporated community in the state of Oregon, United States

Coordinates: 44.977°N 123.208°W

Crowley is an unincorporated community in Polk County, Oregon, United States. It is located east of Oregon Route 99W, about four miles north of Rickreall.

Crowley was a station on the Southern Pacific Railroad between Derry and McCoy, established in 1892 as "Crowleys" and named for Solomon Kimsey Crowley. Crowley, who was born in Missouri in 1833, came west in 1852 and settled in the Oak Grove area of Polk County in 1855. The "s" was dropped from the name of the station in 1898. The rail line is now owned by the Portland and Western Railroad, but Crowley is no longer a station. The Crowley post office operated intermittently from 1881 to 1904. There was later a Crowley post office established in Malheur County.
