= Simi Fehoko =

American football player (born 1997)

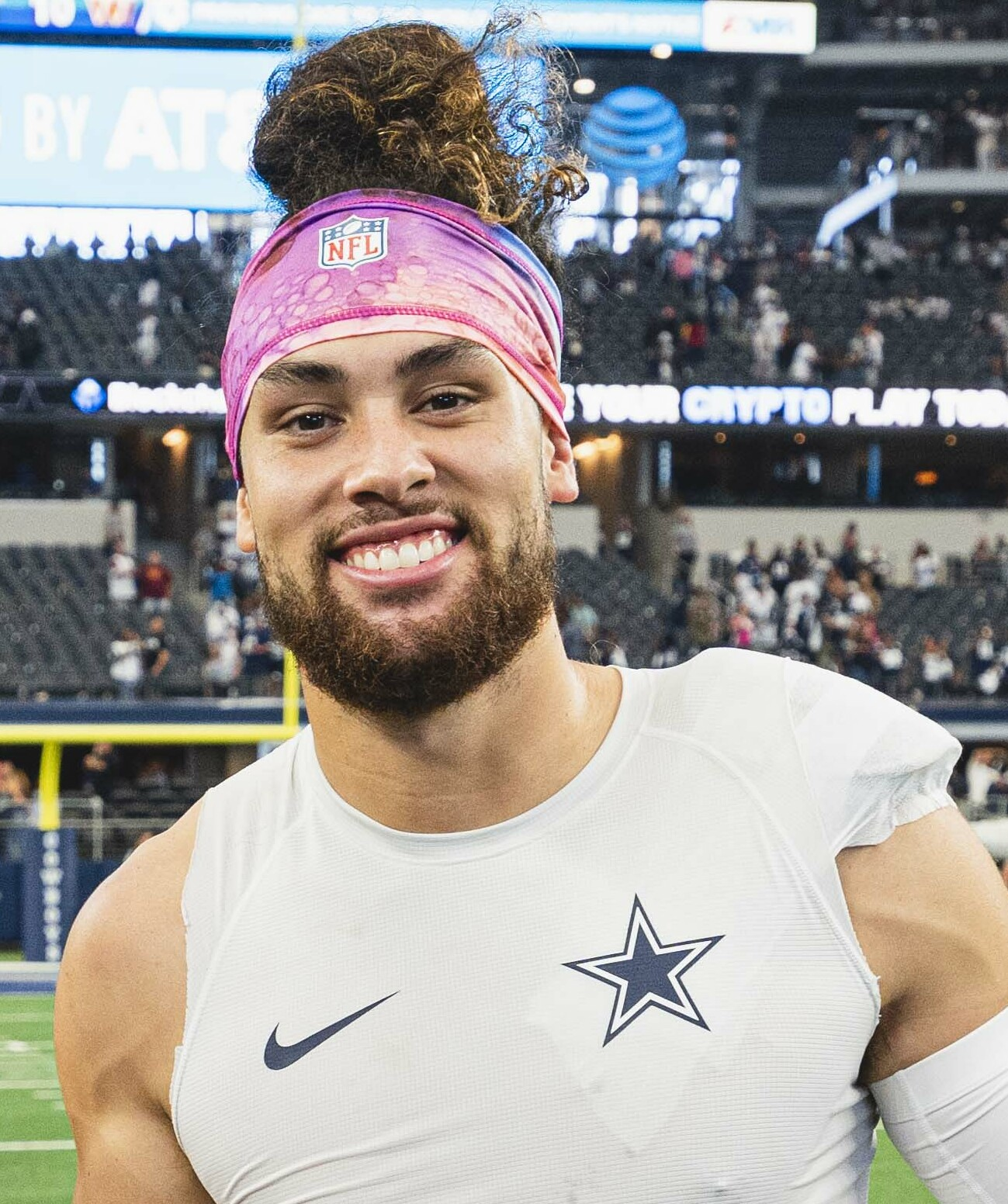
- Fehoko with the Dallas Cowboys in 2022

No. 80 – Arizona Cardinals
- Position: Wide receiver
- Roster status: Active

Personal information
- Born: November 5, 1997 (age 29); Salt Lake City, Utah, U.S.
- Listed height: 6 ft 4 in (1.93 m)
- Listed weight: 225 lb (102 kg)

Career information
- High school: Brighton (Cottonwood Heights, Utah)
- College: Stanford (2018–2020)
- NFL draft: 2021: 5th round, 179th overall pick

Career history
- Dallas Cowboys (2021–2022); Pittsburgh Steelers (2023)*; Los Angeles Chargers (2023–2024); Arizona Cardinals (2025–present)
- * Offseason or practice squad member only

Awards and highlights
- First-team All-Pac-12 (2020)

Career NFL statistics as of Week 10, 2026
- Receptions: 12
- Receiving yards: 177
- Receiving touchdowns: 1
- Stats at Pro Football Reference

Simione Tufui Fehoko (/ˈfeɪhoʊkoʊ/ FAY-hoh-koh; born November 5, 1997) is an American professional football wide receiver for the Arizona Cardinals of the National Football League (NFL). He played college football for the Stanford Cardinals and was selected by the Dallas Cowboys in the fifth round of 2021 NFL draft.

== Early life ==
Fehoko played football at Brighton High School in Cottonwood Heights, Utah. As a junior he led the state in receiving, posting 65 receptions for 1,656 yards and 24 receiving touchdowns (state record).

As a senior, he tallied 59 receptions for 1,495 yards and 16 receiving touchdowns. He was a two-time All-state selection and was named to the 2015 USA Today All-USA high school football second-team. He set the state record for career receiving yards (3,571) and career receiving touchdowns (41). He was a four star recruit coming out of high school and committed to Stanford University to play college football.

Fehoko also lettered in basketball.

== College career ==
After a two-year LDS mission in Seoul, Korea, Fehoko began his freshman season in 2018. He played in the last 4 games as a backup, making one reception for 6 yards.

As a sophomore, he appeared in 12 games with one start. He registered 24 receptions for 566 yards (fourth on the team), a 23.58-yard average per reception (school record) and 6 receiving touchdowns (second on the team). He had 3 receptions for 97 receiving yards and 2 touchdowns against the University of Arizona. He made 3 receptions for 92 yard and 2 touchdowns against Washington State University.

As a junior in 2020, the football season was reduced to 6 games due to the COVID-19 pandemic. He played in all 6 games with 5 starts, leading the team with 37 receptions for 574 yards, a 15.5-yard average per reception and 3 touchdowns, while being named to the All-Pac-12 First-team. He had 6 receptions for 100 yards against Oregon State University. He tallied 16 receptions (school record), 230 receiving yards (third in school history) and 3 receiving touchdowns in the double-overtime win over UCLA, 48-47.

On August 28, 2020, he announced that he would forgo his senior season in order to enter the 2021 NFL draft. He finished his college career with 62 receptions for 1,146 yards, an 18.5-yard average per reception (third in school history), 9 receiving touchdowns and 77% of his total receptions (48) resulted in either a first down or a touchdown.

== Professional career ==
Pre-draft measurables
| Height | Weight | Arm length | Hand span | Wingspan | 40-yard dash | 10-yard split | 20-yard split | 20-yard shuttle | Three-cone drill | Vertical jump | Broad jump | Bench press |
|---|---|---|---|---|---|---|---|---|---|---|---|---|
| 6 ft 3 7/8 in (1.93 m) | 222 lb (101 kg) | 31 5/8 in (0.80 m) | 10 1/4 in (0.26 m) | 6 ft 4 7/8 in (1.95 m) | 4.43 s | 1.59 s | 2.62 s | 4.26 s | 6.78 s | 34.5 in (0.88 m) | 10 ft 0 in (3.05 m) | 16 reps |
All values from Pro Day

=== Dallas Cowboys ===
Fehoko was selected by the Dallas Cowboys in the fifth round (179th overall) of the 2021 NFL Draft. He signed his four-year rookie contract on May 13, 2021. As a rookie, he appeared in 5 games, playing mainly on special teams, but did not record any stats. He was placed on Reserve/COVID-19 list for the fifteenth game against the Washington Commanders. He was declared inactive for the Wild Card playoff game.

In 2022, he appeared in 5 games, making 5 receptions for 24 yards. He suffered a left shoulder injury in the fifth game against the Los Angeles Rams. On October 15, 2022, he was placed on injured reserve.

In the 2023 preseason, he fell on the depth chart behind second-year player Jalen Tolbert and rookie Jalen Brooks. On August 29, 2023, he was waived.

=== Pittsburgh Steelers ===
On August 31, 2023, Fehoko was signed to the practice squad of the Pittsburgh Steelers. He was on the same team as his cousin, nose tackle Breiden Fehoko.

=== Los Angeles Chargers ===
On September 25, 2023, Fehoko signed with the Los Angeles Chargers off the Steelers practice squad, to provide depth after Mike Williams was lost for the season. He reunited with offensive coordinator Kellen Moore, who also was his offensive coordinator with the Cowboys. He was released on December 5 and re-signed to the practice squad two days later. He appeared in 6 games playing mostly on special teams, while compiling one reception for 9 yards, one touchdown and one special teams tackle. He was declared inactive in 3 contests.

He signed a reserve/future contract on January 11, 2024. He appeared in the first eight regular season games with two starts. He had 3 receptions for 45 yards in the first start of his NFL career against the Arizona Cardinals. On November 6, 2024, he was placed on injured reserve with an elbow injury. On January 10, 2025, he was activated from injured reserve, returning to play in the Wild Card playoff game against the Houston Texans. He finished the season with 6 receptions for 106 yards (17.7-yard avg.) and two special teams tackles.

=== Arizona Cardinals ===
On March 14, 2025, the Arizona Cardinals signed Fehoko to a one-year contract. He was waived on August 26 as part of final roster cuts and re-signed to the practice squad the next day. On September 10, Fehoko was promoted to the active roster. He filled the special teams responsibilities of Joey Blount, after he was lost for the season with a neck injury. In Week 10 against the Seattle Seahawks, he showed his toughness after injuring his right ankle on a special teams play, he had it retaped, only to break his arm while making a tackle on the following kickoff. On November 12, he was placed on injured reserve after suffering a concussion, broken arm, and sprained ankle. He finished with 7 special teams tackles (tied for third on the team at the time) and a career-high 116 special teams snaps. He only saw 37 snaps on offense with no targets.

On March 13, 2026, Fehoko re-signed with the Cardinals on a one-year contract. In Week 1 against the Chargers, Fehoko blocked a punt and was named NFC Special Teams Player of the Week for his performance.

== Personal life ==
His cousin Breiden Fehoko played nose tackle in the NFL. Fehoko is a member of the Church of Jesus Christ of Latter-day Saints.
