= Derry, Oregon =

Unincorporated community in the state of Oregon, United States

Coordinates: 44°55′47″N 123°12′47″W

Derry is an unincorporated locale in Polk County, Oregon, United States. It is located about 10 miles west of Salem and one mile east of Rickreall.

Derry was originally a station on the Southern Pacific line (now the Portland and Western). Local resident James Nesmith named it for Derry, New Hampshire, where his family once lived. In 1912, The Oregonian reported on an unsuccessful effort to change the name of the station to Loganberry. Just southeast of Derry there was a station on the Salem, Falls City and Western Railway named Derry Orchard.
