= Talanoa Hufanga =

American football player (born 2000)

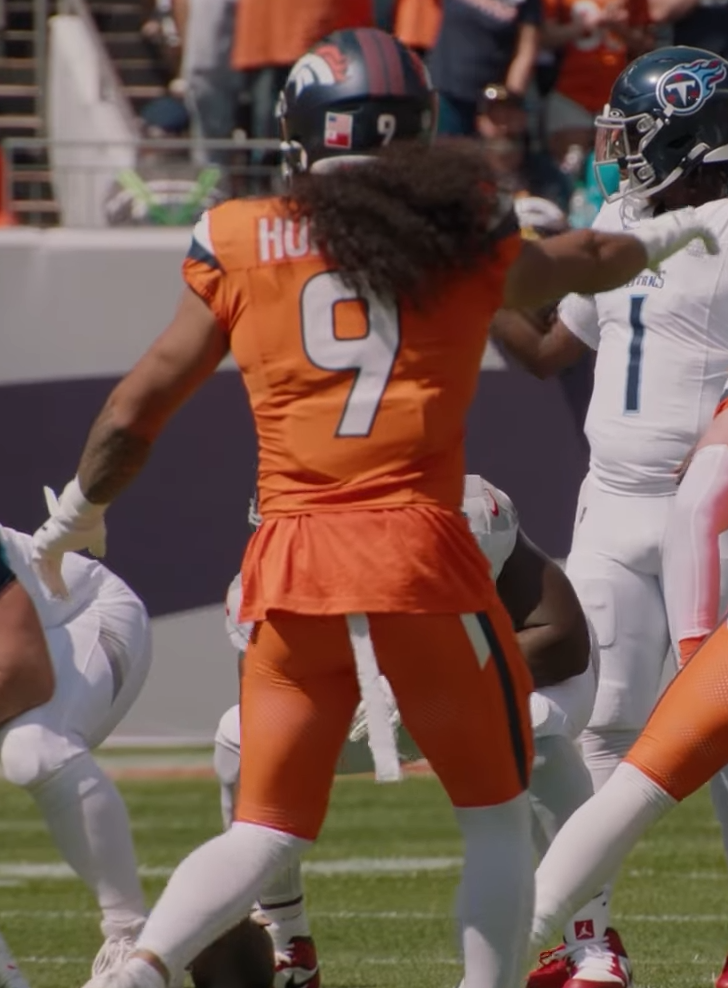
- Hufanga with the Denver Broncos in 2025

No. 9 – Denver Broncos
- Position: Strong safety
- Roster status: Active

Personal information
- Born: February 1, 2000 (age 26); Corvallis, Oregon, U.S.
- Listed height: 6 ft 0 in (1.83 m)
- Listed weight: 200 lb (91 kg)

Career information
- High school: Crescent Valley (Corvallis)
- College: USC (2018–2020)
- NFL draft: 2021: 5th round, 180th overall pick

Career history
- San Francisco 49ers (2021–2024); Denver Broncos (2025–present)

Awards and highlights
- First-team All-Pro (2022); Second-team All-Pro (2025); Pro Bowl (2022); Polynesian Professional Football Player of the Year (2022); Polynesian College Football Player of the Year (2020); Pat Tillman Defensive Player of the Year (2020); Consensus All-American (2020); First-team All-Pac-12 (2020); Second-team All-Pac-12 (2019)

Career NFL statistics as of Week 5, 2026
- Total tackles: 348
- Sacks: 5.0
- Forced fumbles: 4
- Pass deflections: 28
- Interceptions: 9
- Defensive touchdowns: 2
- Stats at Pro Football Reference

Talanoa Hufanga (Tongan: [ˌtalaˈnoa huˈfaŋa] TA-luh-noh-uh hoo-FAHNG-ə; born February 1, 2000) is an American professional football strong safety for the Denver Broncos of the National Football League (NFL). He played college football for the USC Trojans and was selected by the San Francisco 49ers in the fifth round of the 2021 NFL draft.

== Early life ==
Hufanga attended Crescent Valley High School in Corvallis, Oregon. He played safety, wide receiver, and quarterback. As a senior in 2017, Hufanga was the Polynesian High School National Player of the Year. He played in the 2018 U.S. Army All-American Game. Hufanga committed to the University of Southern California (USC) to play college football.

== College career ==
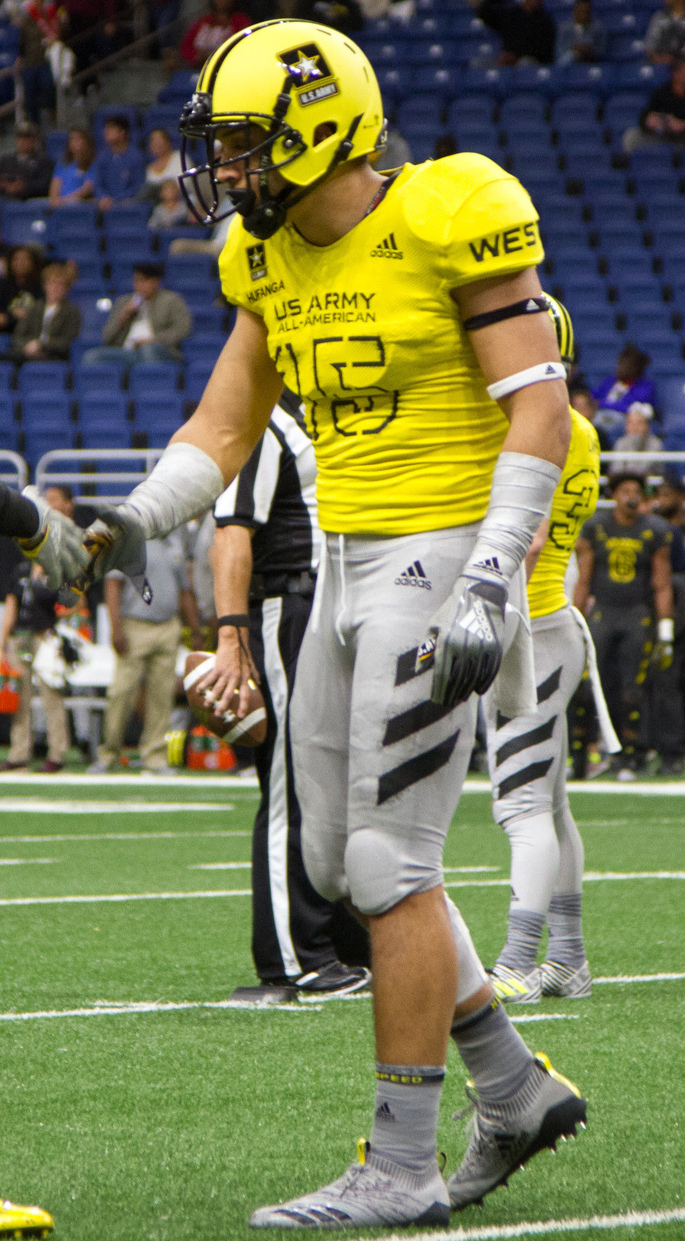
Hufanga at the 2018 All-American Bowl

As a true freshman at USC in 2018, Hufanga played in eight games with five starts before suffering a season-ending broken collarbone. He finished the season with 51 tackles.

As a sophomore in 2019, Hufanga started all 10 games he played in and recorded 90 tackles and 3.5 sacks.

As a junior in 2020, Hufanga returned to USC as a starter. He and BYU quarterback Zach Wilson were selected as co-recipients of the 2020 Polynesian College Football Player of the Year Award. For the 2020 season, Hufanga was a Consensus All-American. He also won Pac-12 Conference Defensive Player of the Year.

== Professional career ==
=== Pre-draft ===
NFL.com lead analyst Lance Zierlein projected Hufanga to be selected in the fourth or fifth round of the 2021 NFL Draft. Bleacher Report had him ranked as the 12th best safety prospect and projected him to be selected in the fourth round. Dane Brugler of the Athletic had Hufanga ranked as the eighth best safety prospect. Scouts Inc. had him as the 20th best safety in their big board (212th overall).

Pre-draft measurables
Height	Weight	Arm length	Hand span	Wingspan	40-yard dash	10-yard split	20-yard split	20-yard shuttle	Three-cone drill	Vertical jump	Broad jump	Bench press
6 ft 0 3/8 in (1.84 m)	199 lb (90 kg)	32 in (0.81 m)	9 7/8 in (0.25 m)	6 ft 5 1/4 in (1.96 m)	4.64 s	1.63 s	2.65 s	4.39 s	6.96 s	35.5 in (0.90 m)	10 ft 8 in (3.25 m)	12 reps
All values from Pro Day

=== San Francisco 49ers ===
==== 2021 ====
The San Francisco 49ers selected Hufanga in the fifth round (180th overall) of the 2021 NFL draft. He was the 14th safety drafted in 2021. On May 13, 2021, the 49ers signed Hufanga to a four-year, $3.72 million rookie contract that includes an initial signing bonus of $240,152.

External videos
- 49ers select Talanoa Hufanga No. 180
- 49ers call safety Talanoa Hufanga

Throughout training camp, Hufanga competed to be the starting strong safety against Tavon Wilson, Tarvarius Moore, and Jaquiski Tartt. Head coach Kyle Shanahan named Hufanga the No. 2 strong safety on the depth chart to begin the season.

Hufanga made his professional regular season debut during the season-opening 41–33 road victory over the Detroit Lions, but saw limited snaps on defense and special teams. During Week 8 against the Chicago Bears, Hufanga earned his first career start in place of Tartt, who was placed on injured reserve. Hufanga finished the 33–22 road victory with a season-high five combined tackles (four solo). Two weeks later against the Los Angeles Rams on Monday Night Football, Hufanga recorded three solo tackles and a pass deflection in the 31–10 victory.

During a Week 12 34–26 victory over the Minnesota Vikings, Hufanga had two solo tackles and a pass deflection. Two weeks later against the Cincinnati Bengals, he tied his season-high of five combined tackles (four solo) in the 26–23 overtime road victory. Hufanga was inactive for two games (Weeks 16–17) due to a knee injury.

Hufanga finished his rookie year with 32 combined tackles (24 solo) and two pass deflections in 15 games and three starts. He received an overall grade of 62.5 from Pro Football Focus as a rookie. The 49ers finished third in the NFC West with a 10–7 record and qualified for the playoffs as the #6-seed. In the Divisional Round against the Green Bay Packers, Hufanga made his postseason debut and scored his first NFL touchdown after returning a punt that was blocked by defensive lineman Jordan Willis during the fourth quarter of the 13–10 road victory.

==== 2022 ====
During training camp, Hufanga competed to be a starting safety against Tayler Hawkins, Leon O'Neal Jr., and George Odum. Head coach Kyle Shanahan named him the starting strong safety to begin the season alongside Tashaun Gipson.

During the season-opener against the Bears, Hufanga had a team-high 11 combined tackles (nine solo), a pass deflection, and an interception in the 19–10 road loss. In the next game against the Seattle Seahawks, he recorded six combined tackles (five solo) and two pass deflections during the 27–7 victory. Two weeks later against the Rams on Monday Night Football, Hufanga had four combined tackles (three solo), a pass deflection, and a 52-yard pick six in the 24–9 victory.

During a Week 5 37–15 road victory over the Carolina Panthers, Hufanga recorded five combined tackles (two solo), a pass deflection, and his first NFL sack on Baker Mayfield. Two weeks later against the Kansas City Chiefs, Hufanga had four combined tackles (two solo), a pass deflection, and an interception in the 44–23 loss. During Week 10 over the Los Angeles Chargers on Sunday Night Football, he recorded two combined tackles (one solo), a pass deflection, and an interception in the 22–16 victory.

During Week 12 against the New Orleans Saints, Hufanga had a team-high nine combined tackles (six solo) and a forced fumble in the 13–0 shutout victory. Three weeks later against the Seahawks on Thursday Night Football, he recorded five combined tackles (four solo), a pass deflection, and a strip-sack as the 49ers clinched the NFC West with a 21–13 road victory. In the next game against the Washington Commanders, he had eight combined tackles (five solo) and a pass deflection during the 37–20 victory.

Hufanga finished his second professional season started with 97 combined tackles (66 solo), nine pass deflections, a career-high four interceptions, two forced fumbles, and a sack in 17 games and starts. He earned a Pro Bowl nomination and first team All-Pro honors. Hufanga received an overall grade of 72.1 from Pro Football Focus in 2022. The 49ers finished with a 13–4 record and qualified for the playoffs as the #2-seed. During the Wild Card Round against the Seahawks, Hufanga made his first career start in a playoff game and finished the 41–23 victory with five combined tackles (three solo). In the Divisional Round against the Dallas Cowboys, Hufanga once again had five combined tackles (two solo) during the 19–12 victory. During the NFC Championship Game against the Philadelphia Eagles, he had six combined tackles (four solo) and a pass deflection in the 31–7 road loss. Hufanga was ranked 78th by his fellow players on the NFL Top 100 Players of 2023.

==== 2023 ====
On February 9, 2023, the 49ers hired Steve Wilks to be their new defensive coordinator after DeMeco Ryans accepted the head coaching position with the Houston Texans. Head coach Kyle Shanahan named Hufanga as the starting strong safety to begin the season and paired him with Tashaun Gipson.

During the season-opening 30–7 road victory over the Pittsburgh Steelers, Hufanga had five solo tackles, a pass deflection, and an interception. Two weeks later against the New York Giants on Thursday Night Football, he recorded a solo tackle, a pass deflection, and an interception in the 30–12 victory.

During Week 8 against the Cincinnati Bengals, Hufanga recorded a team-high 10 combined tackles (tied with Isaiah Oliver and Fred Warner) in the 31–17 loss. Following a Week 9 bye, the 49ers went on the road to face the Jacksonville Jaguars. Hufanga finished the 34–3 blowout victory with a team-high eight combined tackles (tied with Dre Greenlaw), a pass deflection, and an interception. In the next game against the Tampa Bay Buccaneers, he recorded a solo tackle before leaving the eventual 27–14 victory during the third quarter with a knee injury. It was later revealed that Hufanga tore his ACL, prematurely ending his season. Hufanga was placed on injured reserve on November 21.

Hufanga finished the 2023 season with 52 combined tackles (39 solo), three interceptions, and three pass deflections in 10 games and starts. Without him, the 49ers finished atop the NFC West with a 12–5 record and reached Super Bowl LVIII, where they lost in overtime by a score of 25–22 to the Chiefs.

==== 2024 ====
Hufanga remained on injured reserve for the first two games of the season. He made his season debut in Week 3 against the Rams and finished the 27–24 road loss with seven combined tackles (four solo). However, Hufanga missed the next game against the New England Patriots due to an ankle injury he suffered in practice a few days before the game. The following week against the Cardinals, Hufanga returned from injury and made a solo tackle before leaving the eventual narrow 24–23 loss in the second quarter with a wrist injury. On October 9, 2024, the 49ers officially placed him on injured reserve due to torn ligaments in his wrist.

On December 7, Hufanga was activated off of injured reserve after being inactive for seven consecutive games (Weeks 6–13). He returned from injury the next day against the Bears and recorded five combined tackles (two solo) in the 38–14 victory. In the next game against the Rams on Thursday Night Football, Hufanga recorded a season-high eight combined tackles (two solo) during the 12–6 loss.

Hufanga finished the 2024 season with 38 combined tackles (20 solo) in seven games and starts. He received an overall grade of 57.8 from Pro Football Focus.

=== Denver Broncos ===
==== 2025 ====
On March 10, 2025, the Denver Broncos signed Hufanga to a three-year, $45 million contract with $20 million guaranteed.

Hufanga made his Broncos debut in the season-opener against the Tennessee Titans and finished the 20–12 victory with a team-high 11 combined tackles (seven solo) and a forced fumble. In the next game against the Indianapolis Colts, Hufanga had 10 combined tackles (five solo) during the narrow 29–28 road loss. The following week against the Chargers, he recorded six tackles (four solo) and two pass deflections in the 23–20 road loss.

During a Week 5 21–17 comeback road victory over the reigning Super Bowl-champion Eagles, Hufanga had a team-high seven combined tackles (four solo) and a pass deflection. In the next game against the New York Jets in London, he recorded five combined tackles (four solo), a pass deflection, and his first sack of the season on Justin Fields during the narrow 13–11 victory. The following week against the Giants, Hufanga had five combined tackles (four solo) and two pass deflections in the narrow 33–32 comeback victory.

During Week 9 against the Texans, Hufanga recorded nine combined tackles (five solo) and two pass deflections in the 18–15 road victory. In the next game against the Las Vegas Raiders on Thursday Night Football, he had a team-high nine combined tackles (five solo) and his second sack of the season on Geno Smith during the 10–7 victory. The following week against the Chiefs, Hufanga recorded six combined tackles (three solo) and a pass deflection in the 22–19 victory.

Following a Week 12 bye, the Broncos went on the road to face the Commanders on Sunday Night Football. Hufanga finished the narrow 27–26 overtime victory with a season-high 13 combined tackles (10 solo) and a pass deflection. Three weeks later against the Jaguars, he had four combined tackles (three solo) and a pass deflection in the 34–20 loss.

Hufanga finished the 2025 season with a career-high 106 combined tackles (67 solo), 11 pass deflections, two sacks, and a forced fumble in 17 games and starts. The Broncos finished atop the AFC West with a 14–3 record and qualified for the playoffs as the #1-seed. In the Divisional Round against the Buffalo Bills, Hufanga recorded 10 combined tackles (seven solo) and a fumble recovery during the 33–30 overtime victory. During the AFC Championship Game against the Patriots, he had seven combined tackles (four solo) and two pass deflections in the 10–7 loss.

==== 2026 ====
During a Week 3 30–26 comeback victory over the Rams on Sunday Night Football, Hufanga recorded five combined tackles (two solo), three pass deflections, a sack, and two intreceptions in the fourth quarter off of Matthew Stafford, including a 66-yard pick six and a game-winning interception in the end zone. Hufanga was named AFC Defensive Player of the Week for his performance. In the next game against his former team, the San Francisco 49ers, Hufanga had four combined tackles (two solo) during the 24–14 road loss. The following week against the Chargers, he recorded two solo tackles and a forced fumble before leaving the eventual 23–17 road victory in the third quarter with an ankle injury.

== Career statistics ==
=== NFL ===
Legend
**Bold**	Career high

==== Regular season ====
Year	Team	Games		Tackles					Interceptions						Fumbles		
Year	Team	GP	GS	Cmb	Solo	Ast	TFL	Sck	PD	Int	Yds	Avg	Lng	TD	FF	FR	TD
2021	SF	15	3	32	24	8	1	0.0	1	0	0	0.0	0	0	0	0	0
2022	SF	17	17	97	66	31	5	**2.0**	9	**4**	61	15.3	52T	**1**	**2**	0	0
2023	SF	10	10	52	39	13	1	0.0	3	3	48	16.0	28	0	0	0	0
2024	SF	7	7	38	20	18	2	0.0	0	0	0	0.0	0	0	0	0	0
2025	DEN	17	17	**106**	**67**	**39**	**6**	**2.0**	**11**	0	0	0.0	0	0	1	0	0
2026	DEN	5	5	23	12	11	3	1.0	3	2	**66**	**33.0**	**66T**	**1**	1	0	0
Career		71	59	348	228	120	18	5.0	28	9	175	19.4	66T	2	4	0	0

==== Postseason ====
Year	Team	Games		Tackles					Interceptions						Fumbles		
Year	Team	GP	GS	Cmb	Solo	Ast	TFL	Sck	PD	Int	Yds	Avg	Lng	TD	FF	FR	TD
2021	SF	2	0	1	0	1	0	0.0	0	0	0	0.0	0	0	0	0	0
2022	SF	**3**	**3**	16	9	**7**	0	0.0	1	0	0	0.0	0	0	0	0	0
2023	SF	0	0	Did not play due to injury													
2025	DEN	2	2	**17**	**11**	6	**1**	0.0	**2**	0	0	0.0	0	0	0	**1**	0
Career		7	5	34	20	14	1	0.0	3	0	0	0.0	0	0	0	1	0

=== College ===
Legend
**Bold**	Career high

Year	GP	Tackles					Interceptions				Fumbles
Year	GP	Solo	Ast	Tot	Loss	Sk	Int	Yds	Avg	PD	FF
2018	8	31	20	51	3.5	0.0	0	0	0.0	**4**	0
2019	**10**	**58**	**32**	**90**	**7.5**	**3.5**	0	0	0.0	3	**2**
2020	6	40	22	62	5.5	3.0	**4**	**90**	**22.5**	1	**2**
Career	24	129	74	203	16.5	6.5	4	90	22.5	8	4

== Personal life ==
Hufanga is of Tongan descent. He is the son of Tevita and Tanya Hufanga and has a brother named TJ. Hufanga also trains with Hall of Fame safety Troy Polamalu.

Hufanga is the cousin of New York Giants defensive tackle Marlon Tuipulotu and Los Angeles Chargers linebacker Tuli Tuipulotu.

Hufanga is a Christian.
