= Marlon Tuipulotu =

American football player (born 1999)

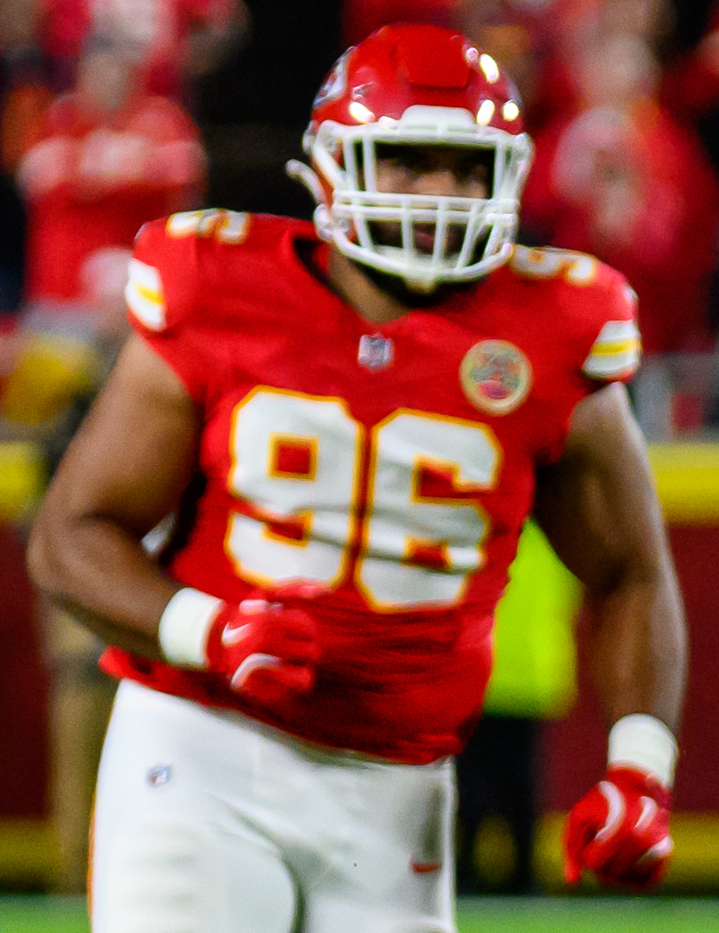
- Tuipulotu with the Kansas City Chiefs in 2025

Profile
- Position: Defensive tackle

Personal information
- Born: May 31, 1999 (age 27); Independence, Oregon, U.S.
- Listed height: 6 ft 2 in (1.88 m)
- Listed weight: 307 lb (139 kg)

Career information
- High school: Central (Independence)
- College: USC (2017–2020)
- NFL draft: 2021: 6th round, 189th overall pick

Career history
- Philadelphia Eagles (2021–2023); Kansas City Chiefs (2024–2025); New York Giants (2026)*; Atlanta Falcons (2026)*
- * Offseason or practice squad member only

Awards and highlights
- First-team All-Pac-12 (2020)

Career NFL statistics as of 2025
- Total tackles: 48
- Sacks: 3.0
- Fumble recoveries: 1
- Stats at Pro Football Reference

Marlon Tuipulotu (born May 31, 1999) is an American professional football defensive tackle. He played college football for the USC Trojans and was selected in the sixth round of the 2021 NFL draft by the Philadelphia Eagles.

== Early life ==
Tuipulotu attended Central High School in Independence, Oregon. As a senior in 2016, he had 62 tackles and six sacks. Tuipulotu played in the 2017 U.S. Army All-American Bowl. He originally committed to the University of Washington to play college football but switched his commitment to the University of Southern California (USC). Tuipulotu was also on the wrestling team in high school and won the 5A State Championship at 285lb in 2016.

== College career ==
Tuipulotu played in three games his first year at USC in 2017 due to injuries and took a redshirt. As a redshirt freshman in 2018, he started 10 of 12 games and recorded 33 tackles and 4.5 sacks. In 2019, he had 46 tackles and two sacks in 12 starts. Tuipulotu returned as a starter in 2020.

== Professional career ==
Pre-draft measurables
Height	Weight	Arm length	Hand span	Wingspan	40-yard dash	10-yard split	20-yard split	20-yard shuttle	Three-cone drill	Vertical jump	Broad jump	Bench press
6 ft 1 7/8 in (1.88 m)	307 lb (139 kg)	33 in (0.84 m)	10 3/8 in (0.26 m)	6 ft 9 in (2.06 m)	5.38 s	1.79 s	3.00 s	4.65 s	7.65 s	30.5 in (0.77 m)	8 ft 7 in (2.62 m)	29 reps
All values from Pro Day

=== Philadelphia Eagles ===
Tuipulotu was selected by the Philadelphia Eagles in the sixth round, 189th overall, of the 2021 NFL draft.

In Week 8 of the 2022 NFL season, Tuipulotu recorded the first sack of his career, tackling Pittsburgh Steelers quarterback Kenny Pickett in a 13–35 win. In Week 10 of the 2022 season, Tuipulotu recorded the first fumble recovery of his career in a game against the Washington Commanders. He was placed on injured reserve on November 16, 2022 after suffering a torn meniscus. Without Tuipulotu, the Eagles reached Super Bowl LVII but lost 38–35 to the Kansas City Chiefs. On August 29, 2024, Tuipulotu was released by the Eagles.

=== Kansas City Chiefs ===
On August 31, 2024, Tuipulotu was signed to the Kansas City Chiefs' practice squad, then promoted to the active roster a week later. On January 10, 2025, the Chiefs placed Tuipulotu on injured reserve.

On August 26, 2025, Tuipulotu was released by the Chiefs as part of final roster cuts, and re-signed to the practice squad.

=== New York Giants ===
On January 13, 2026, Tuipulotu signed a reserve/futures contract with the New York Giants. He was released by the Giants on May 7.

=== Atlanta Falcons ===
On August 4, 2026, Tuipulotu signed with the Atlanta Falcons. On August 30, he was released by Atlanta as a part of final roster cuts.

== Personal life ==
Tuipulotu is of Tongan descent. His younger brother, Tuli Tuipulotu, also played linebacker at USC and currently plays in the National Football League for the Los Angeles Chargers. He is also the cousin of former USC and current Denver Broncos safety Talanoa Hufanga.
