= Modeville, Oregon =

Unincorporated community in the state of Oregon, United States

- Unincorporated community
- Location within Oregon Location within the United States
- Coordinates: 44°47′28″N 123°07′59″W
- Country: United States
- State: Oregon
- County: Polk
- Elevation: 177 ft (54 m)
- Time zone: UTC-8 (Pacific (PST))
  - Summer (DST): UTC-7 (PDT)
- ZIP code: 97351
- Area codes: 503 and 971
- GNIS feature ID: 1124275

Modeville is an unincorporated community in Polk County, Oregon, United States.
