= Nick Ford =

American football player (born 1999)

No. 55 – Massachusetts Pirates
- Position: Center
- Roster status: Active

Personal information
- Born: October 8, 1999 (age 27); San Pedro, California, U.S.
- Listed height: 6 ft 5 in (1.96 m)
- Listed weight: 317 lb (144 kg)

Career information
- High school: San Pedro
- College: Utah (2017–2021)
- NFL draft: 2022: undrafted

Career history
- Jacksonville Jaguars (2022)*; Massachusetts Pirates (2025–present)
- * Offseason or practice squad member only

Awards and highlights
- First-team All-Pac-12 (2021)
- Stats at Pro Football Reference

Nicolas Ford (born October 8, 1999) is an American professional football center for the Massachusetts Pirates of the Indoor Football League (IFL). He played college football for the Utah Utes.

== Early life ==
Ford was raised in San Pedro, California, playing high school football at San Pedro High School. He committed to play college football for the Utah Utes on February 1, 2017.

== Professional career ==
Ford was signed by the Jacksonville Jaguars as an undrafted free agent on April 30, 2022, shortly after the conclusion of the 2022 NFL draft. He was waived on August 30 and signed to the practice squad the next day. He was released off the practice squad on September 12, 2022.

On December 12, 2024, Ford signed with the Massachusetts Pirates of the Indoor Football League (IFL).
