= Central High School (Independence, Oregon) =

Location
- 1530 Monmouth Street; Independence, Oregon 97351; United States; 44.8519°N 123.2100°W

Information
- Type: Public
- Opened: 1950
- School district: Central School District
- Principal: Rick Dormer
- Grades: 9-12
- Enrollment: 1,014 (2023–2024)
- Colors: Red, white, and black
- Athletics conference: OSAA 5A-3 Mid-Willamette Conference
- Mascot: Panther
- Team name: Panthers
- Website: chs.central.k12.or.us
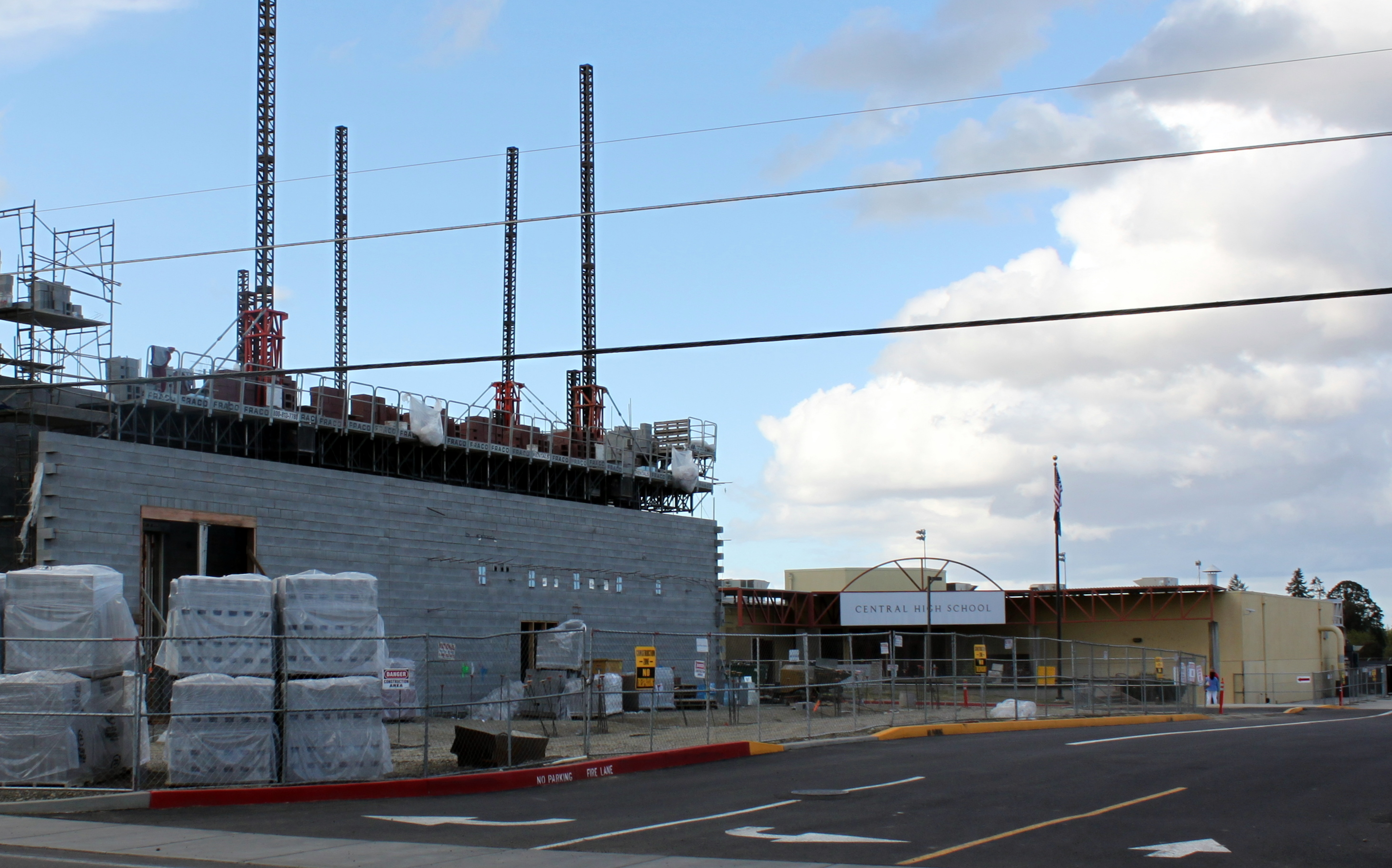

Central High School is a public high school in Independence, Oregon, United States.

== Academics ==
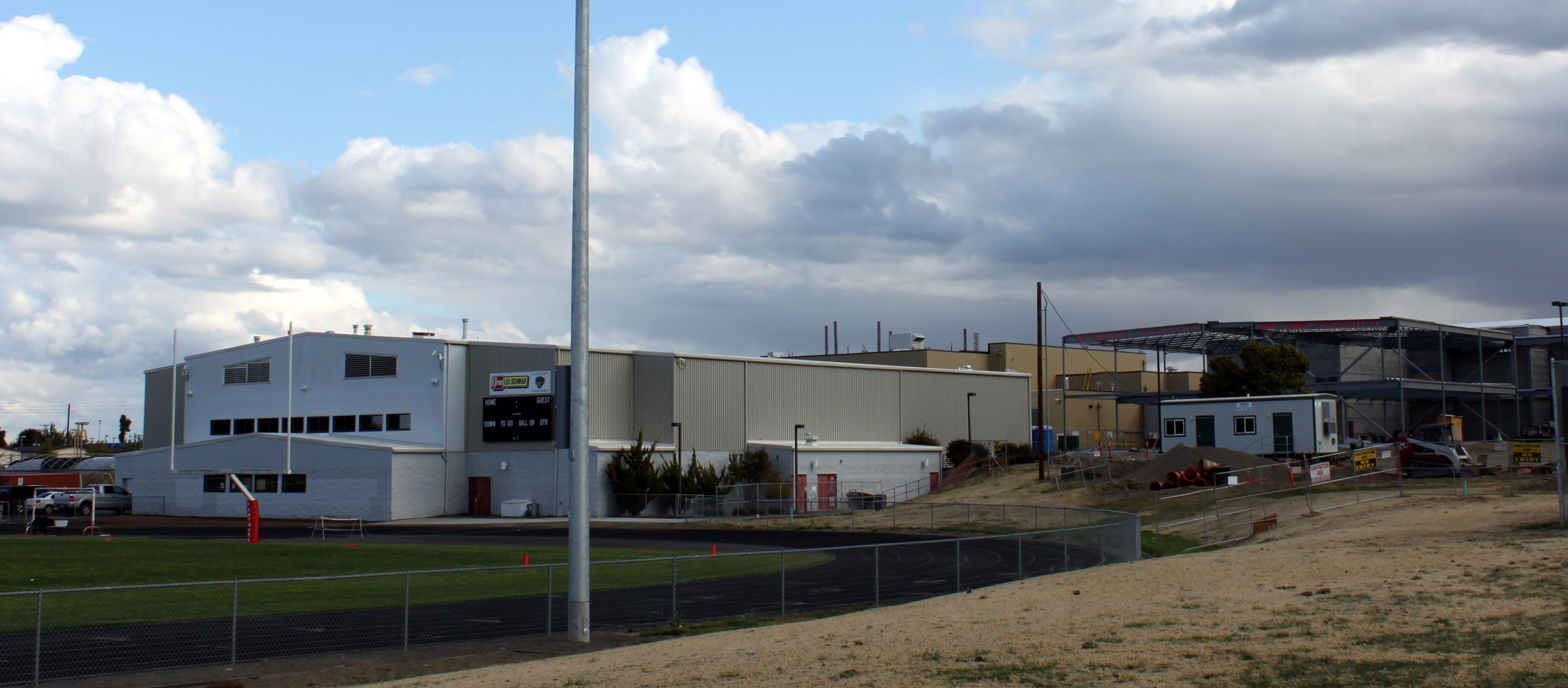
Back of school, under construction in October 2009

In 2005–2006, Central High School was rated "satisfactory" by the Oregon Department of Education.

In 2008, 73% of the school's seniors received a high school diploma. Of 185 students, 135 graduated, 21 dropped out, 14 received a modified diploma, and 15 were still in high school the following year. In 2019–2020, 81% of students graduated on time, and 90% within five years.

== Extracurriculars ==
In 2019, the Central Cheerleaders won first place in the United Spirits Association National Championship for varsity show cheer novice non-tumbling, continuing their success, in 2023 the team won state and went to nationals. They won a state title again in 2025. The school has 3 choirs and 3 bands. The sports programs are football, wrestling, girls' basketball, boys' basketball, cross country, cheerleading, boys' soccer, girls' soccer, volleyball, tennis, golf, baseball, softball, and track and field. There is also a large theater program.

== Notable faculty ==
- Greg Craven, climate change author

== Notable alumni ==
- Jasmine Ash, American singer-songwriter
- Jeff Charleston, defensive end for the New Orleans Saints, member of the team's 2010 Super Bowl team
- John Clem Clarke (class of 1955), football player at Oregon State University, painter
- Patrick Page, class of 1979, Broadway actor
- Marlon Tuipulotu, defensive lineman for the USC Trojans and Philadelphia Eagles, member of the Eagles 2024 Super Bowl team
