= Central School District (Oregon) =

School district in Oregon, United States

Address
- 750 S 5th Street Independence, Oregon, 97351; United States
- Coordinates: 44°50′47″N 123°11′27″W

District information
- Type: Public
- Grades: KG-12
- Superintendent: Dr. Jennifer Kubista
- Chair of the board: Steve Moser
- Schools: 3 Elementary, 1 Middle, 1 High
- NCES District ID: 4102840

Students and staff
- Students: 3,223
- Teachers: 155
- Student–teacher ratio: 22:1

Other information
- Website: www.central.k12.or.us

Central School District (Central SD 13J) is a public school district located in Independence, Oregon. The district consists of Ash Creek Elementary School, Independence Elementary School, Monmouth Elementary School, Talmadge Middle School, and Central High School.
