= Polk County, Oregon =

County in Oregon, United States

- County
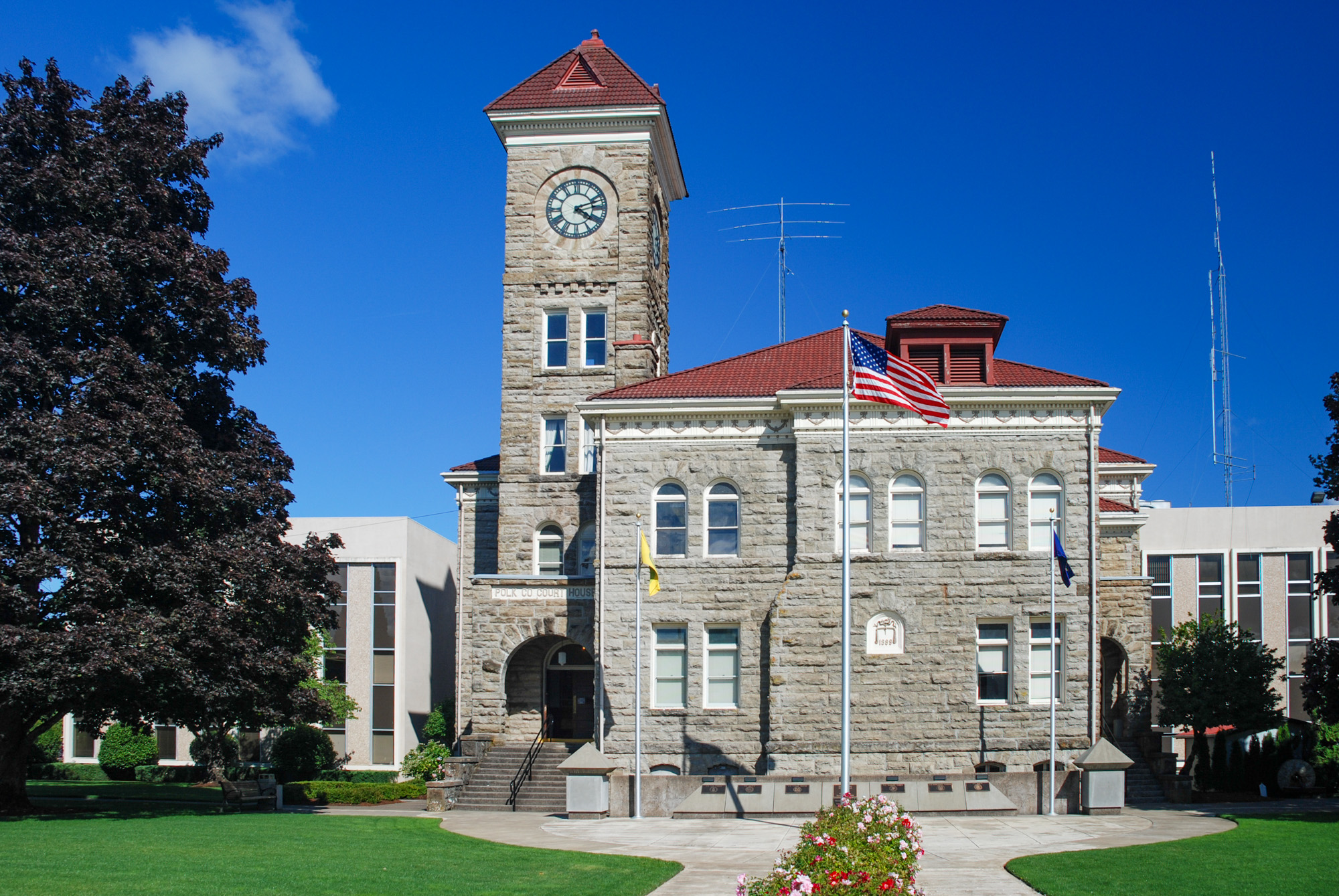
- Polk County Courthouse in Dallas

- Location within the U.S. state of Oregon
- Coordinates: 44°55′N 123°25′W
- Country: United States
- State: Oregon
- Founded: December 22, 1845
- Named for: James K. Polk
- Seat: Dallas
- Largest city: Salem (portion)

Area
  - Total: 744 sq mi (1,930 km^{2})
  - Land: 741 sq mi (1,920 km^{2})
  - Water: 3.1 sq mi (8.0 km^{2}) 0.4%

Population (2020)
  - Total: 87,433
  - Estimate (2025): 90,037 ▲
  - Density: 118/sq mi (46/km^{2})
- Time zone: UTC−8 (Pacific)
  - Summer (DST): UTC−7 (PDT)
- Congressional district: 6th
- Website: www.polkcountyor.gov

Map of Polk County

Polk County is one of the 36 counties in the U.S. state of Oregon. As of the 2020 census, the population was 87,433. The county seat is Dallas. The county is named for James Knox Polk, the 11th president of the United States.

Polk County is part of the Salem, OR Metropolitan Statistical Area, which is also included in the Portland-Vancouver-Salem, OR-WA Combined Statistical Area. It is located in the Willamette Valley.

== History ==
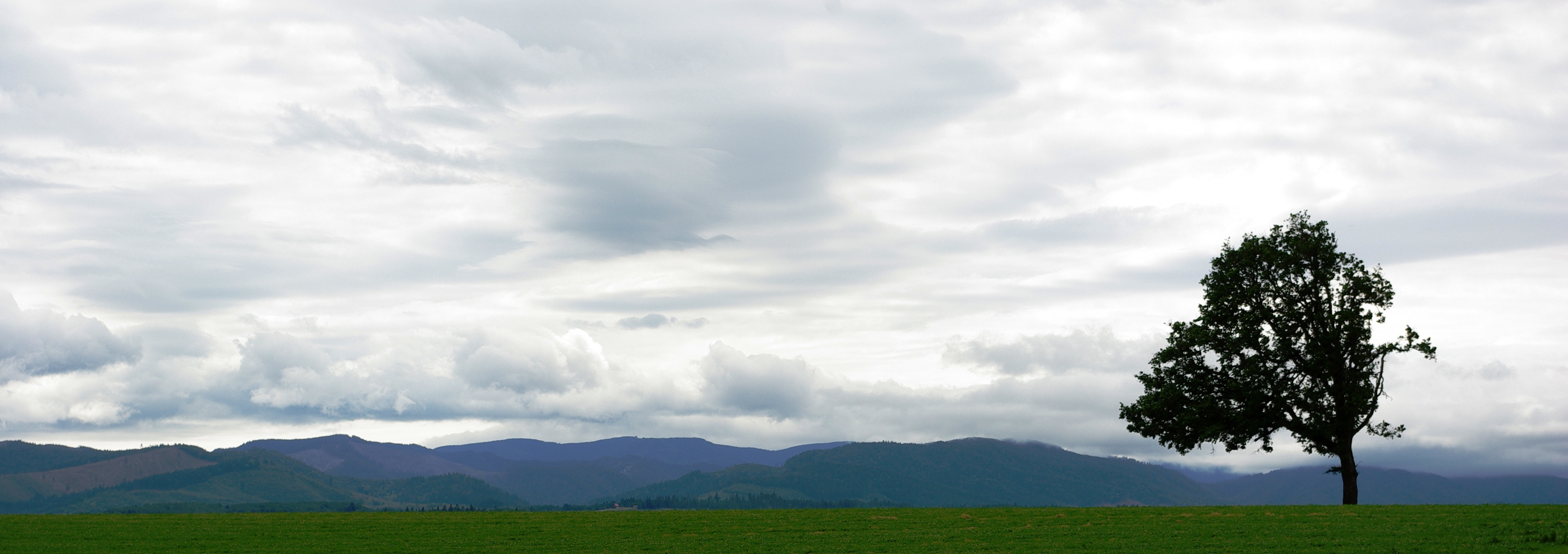
Agricultural field and tree near Perrydale

The Oregon Provisional Legislature created Polk County from Yamhill District on December 22, 1845, granting to it the entire southwestern portion of present-day Oregon to the California border. County boundaries were periodically changed to reflect the creation of Benton and Lincoln counties. Many other counties were subsequently carved out of these as settlement spread towards the south, leaving Polk County many counties away from its former border with California.

The first county seat was a settlement on the north side of Rickreall Creek named Cynthian (also known as Cynthia Ann). In 1852 city officials renamed Cynthian to Dallas after Vice President George M. Dallas, vice president (1845–1849) to James Polk. During the 1880s and 1890s, there were a series of unsuccessful efforts to move the county seat to nearby Independence.

== Geography ==
According to the United States Census Bureau, the county has a total area of 744 square miles (1,930 km^{2}), of which 741 square miles (1,920 km^{2}) is land and 3.1 square miles (8.0 km^{2}) (0.4%) is water.

About two thirds of Polk County, the western part, is forest, mostly of the coniferous and mixed varieties, bordering on temperate rain forest around Laurel Mountain, the wettest place in Oregon.

The eastern half of the county lies in the Willamette Valley. The Willamette River forms the eastern border of the county, separating it from neighboring Marion County.

=== Adjacent counties ===
- Tillamook County (northwest)
- Yamhill County (north)
- Marion County (east)
- Linn County (southeast)
- Benton County (south)
- Lincoln County (west)

=== National protected areas ===
- Baskett Slough National Wildlife Refuge
- Siuslaw National Forest (part)

== Demographics ==
Historical population
Census	Pop.	Note	%±
1860	3,625		—
1870	4,701		29.7%
1880	6,601		40.4%
1890	7,858		19.0%
1900	9,923		26.3%
1910	13,469		35.7%
1920	14,181		5.3%
1930	16,858		18.9%
1940	19,989		18.6%
1950	26,317		31.7%
1960	26,523		0.8%
1970	35,349		33.3%
1980	45,203		27.9%
1990	49,541		9.6%
2000	62,380		25.9%
2010	75,403		20.9%
2020	87,433		16.0%
2025 (est.)	90,037	▲	3.0%
U.S. Decennial Census; 1790–1960 1900–1990; 1990–2000 2010–2020

=== 2020 census ===
Polk County, Oregon – Racial and ethnic composition Note: the US Census treats Hispanic/Latino as an ethnic category. This table excludes Latinos from the racial categories and assigns them to a separate category. Hispanics/Latinos may be of any race.
Race / Ethnicity (NH = Non-Hispanic)	Pop 1980	Pop 1990	Pop 2000	Pop 2010	Pop 2020	% 1980	% 1990	% 2000	% 2010	% 2020
White alone (NH)	42,439	45,145	53,394	60,702	64,719	93.89%	91.13%	85.59%	80.50%	74.02%
Black or African American alone (NH)	155	192	229	394	682	0.34%	0.39%	0.37%	0.52%	0.78%
Native American or Alaska Native alone (NH)	542	704	1,078	1,380	1,579	1.20%	1.42%	1.73%	1.83%	1.81%
Asian alone (NH)	243	653	671	1,403	1,702	0.54%	1.32%	1.08%	1.86%	1.95%
Native Hawaiian or Pacific Islander alone (NH)	x	x	152	201	344	x	x	0.24%	0.27%	0.39%
Other race alone (NH)	236	45	57	79	412	0.52%	0.09%	0.09%	0.10%	0.47%
Mixed race or Multiracial (NH)	x	x	1,319	2,156	5,265	x	x	2.11%	2.86%	6.02%
Hispanic or Latino (any race)	1,588	2,802	5,480	9,088	12,730	3.51%	5.66%	8.78%	12.05%	14.56%
Total	45,203	49,541	62,380	75,403	87,433	100.00%	100.00%	100.00%	100.00%	100.00%

As of the 2020 census, the county had a population of 87,433. Of the residents, 22.6% were under the age of 18 and 19.4% were 65 years of age or older; the median age was 38.6 years. For every 100 females there were 94.4 males, and for every 100 females age 18 and over there were 91.6 males. 79.6% of residents lived in urban areas and 20.4% lived in rural areas.

The racial makeup of the county was 78.1% White, 0.8% Black or African American, 2.2% American Indian and Alaska Native, 2.0% Asian, 0.4% Native Hawaiian and Pacific Islander, 5.8% from some other race, and 10.7% from two or more races. Hispanic or Latino residents of any race comprised 14.6% of the population.

There were 32,135 households in the county, of which 31.4% had children under the age of 18 living with them and 24.4% had a female householder with no spouse or partner present. About 22.3% of all households were made up of individuals and 11.3% had someone living alone who was 65 years of age or older.

There were 33,828 housing units, of which 5.0% were vacant. Among occupied housing units, 65.6% were owner-occupied and 34.4% were renter-occupied. The homeowner vacancy rate was 1.1% and the rental vacancy rate was 5.7%.

=== 2010 census ===
As of the 2010 census, there were 75,403 people, 28,288 households, and 19,545 families living in the county. The population density was 102 inhabitants per square mile (39/km^{2}). There were 30,302 housing units at an average density of 41 units per square mile (16 units/km^{2}). The racial makeup of the county was 85.9% White, 0.6% Black or African American, 2.1% Native American, 1.9% Asian, 0.3% Pacific Islander, 5.4% from other races, and 3.8% from two or more races. 12.1% of the population were Hispanic or Latino of any race.

There were 28,288 households in 2010, out of which 32.4% had children under the age of 18 living with them, 54.2% were married couples living together, 10.3% had a female householder with no husband present, and 30.9% were non-families. 23% of all households were made up of individuals, and 9.8% had someone living alone who was 65 years of age or older. The average household size was 2.60 and the average family size was 3.06.

In the county, the population was spread out, with 24.3% under the age of 18 and 14.8% 65 years of age or older. The median age was 37.1 years. For every 100 females, there were 94.8 males. For every 100 females age 18 and over, there were 91.8 males.

=== 2000 census ===
As of the 2000 census, the median income for a household in the county was $42,311, and the median income for a family was $50,483. Males had a median income of $36,667 versus $26,272 for females. The per capita income for the county was $19,282. About 6.30% of families and 11.50% of the population were below the poverty line, including 12.50% of those under age 18 and 5.50% of those age 65 or over.

== Politics ==
Though Polk County is located in western Oregon, politically it falls in line with the eastern side of the state. The majority of registered voters who are part of a political party in Polk County, as well as most rural counties in Oregon, are members of the Republican Party.

In the 2012 presidential election, 50.54 percent of Polk County voters voted for Republican Mitt Romney, while 46.21 percent voted for Democrat Barack Obama, and 3.25 percent either voted for a Third Party candidate or wrote in a candidate. These numbers show a shift toward the Republican candidate when compared to the 2008 presidential election, in which 48.92% of Polk County voters voted for Republican John McCain, while 48.43 percent voted for Barack Obama, and 2.64 percent either voted for a Third Party candidate or wrote in a candidate. Obama's 2008 performance was the best by a Democrat since Lyndon Johnson carried the county in 1964; the only other Democrats to ever carry Polk County have been Franklin Roosevelt in 1932 and 1936, Woodrow Wilson in 1912, and William Jennings Bryan in 1896.

United States presidential election results for Polk County, Oregon
Year	Republican		Democratic		Third party(ies)	
Year	No.	%	No.	%	No.	%
1904	1,380	63.65%	521	24.03%	267	12.32%
1908	1,456	51.87%	1,113	39.65%	238	8.48%
1912	1,043	32.07%	1,201	36.93%	1,008	31.00%
1916	2,899	47.89%	2,844	46.98%	311	5.14%
1920	2,709	58.97%	1,653	35.98%	232	5.05%
1924	2,755	52.75%	1,621	31.04%	847	16.22%
1928	3,244	64.44%	1,724	34.25%	66	1.31%
1932	2,548	39.12%	3,705	56.88%	261	4.01%
1936	2,246	34.56%	3,694	56.85%	558	8.59%
1940	4,211	50.44%	4,077	48.84%	60	0.72%
1944	3,904	53.19%	3,318	45.20%	118	1.61%
1948	4,328	54.02%	3,451	43.07%	233	2.91%
1952	6,850	69.41%	2,983	30.23%	36	0.36%
1956	6,404	61.28%	4,047	38.72%	0	0.00%
1960	6,709	59.38%	4,578	40.52%	11	0.10%
1964	4,319	37.14%	7,292	62.71%	18	0.15%
1968	6,997	55.66%	4,961	39.46%	613	4.88%
1972	8,985	57.56%	5,908	37.85%	716	4.59%
1976	8,528	48.65%	8,141	46.44%	861	4.91%
1980	10,006	48.74%	7,833	38.15%	2,692	13.11%
1984	12,678	59.15%	8,709	40.64%	45	0.21%
1988	10,553	51.18%	9,626	46.68%	442	2.14%
1992	10,082	39.36%	9,551	37.29%	5,981	23.35%
1996	11,478	45.31%	10,942	43.20%	2,911	11.49%
2000	14,988	52.68%	11,921	41.90%	1,540	5.41%
2004	19,508	54.97%	15,484	43.63%	497	1.40%
2008	17,714	48.92%	17,536	48.43%	957	2.64%
2012	17,819	50.54%	16,292	46.21%	1,146	3.25%
2016	18,940	47.00%	16,420	40.75%	4,935	12.25%
2020	23,732	49.14%	22,917	47.46%	1,642	3.40%
2024	23,768	49.94%	22,034	46.30%	1,791	3.76%

== Economy ==
The major industries of the county are agriculture, forest products, manufacturing, and education. Polk County has the second-largest area devoted to viticulture in Oregon, at 1,322 acres (5.35 km^{2}). Western Oregon University in Monmouth is a major employer.

== Communities ==
=== Cities ===
- Dallas (county seat)
- Falls City
- Independence
- Monmouth
- Salem (part)
- Willamina (part)

=== Census-designated places ===
- Eola
- Fort Hill
- Grand Ronde
- Rickreall

=== Unincorporated communities ===
- Airlie
- Ballston
- Bethel
- Black Rock
- Bridgeport
- Brunks Corner
- Buena Vista
- Crowley
- Ellendale
- Lewisville
- McCoy
- Modeville
- Pedee
- Perrydale
- Salt Creek
- Suver
- Valley Junction
- Valsetz
- Zena

== Education ==
K-12 school districts include:

- Amity School District 4J
- Central School District 13J
- Dallas School District 2
- Falls City School District 57
- Perrydale School District 21
- Philomath School District 17J
- Salem-Keizer School District 24J
- Sheridan School District 48J
- Willamina School District 30J

All of Polk County is within the Chemeketa Community College district.

== See also ==
- National Register of Historic Places listings in Polk County, Oregon
