= Independence, Oregon =

- City
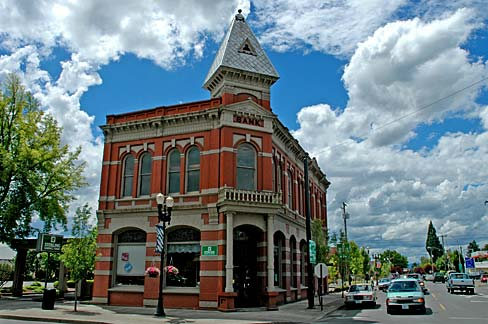
- Independence National Bank

- Location in Oregon

- Location in the United States
- Coordinates: 44°51′17″N 123°11′43″W
- Country: United States
- State: Oregon
- County: Polk
- Incorporated: 1874

Government
  - Mayor: Kate Schwarzler (D)

Area
  - Total: 3.08 sq mi (7.99 km^{2})
  - Land: 2.98 sq mi (7.72 km^{2})
  - Water: 0.10 sq mi (0.26 km^{2})
- Elevation: 171 ft (52 m)

Population (2020)
  - Total: 9,828
  - Density: 3,295.5/sq mi (1,272.41/km^{2})
- Time zone: UTC-8 (Pacific)
  - Summer (DST): UTC-7 (Pacific)
- ZIP code: 97351
- Area codes: 503 and 971
- FIPS code: 41-36150
- GNIS feature ID: 2410099
- Website: www.ci.independence.or.us

Independence is a city in Polk County, Oregon, United States, on the west bank of the Willamette River along Oregon Route 51, and east of nearby Monmouth. It is part of the Salem Metropolitan Statistical Area. Thirty square blocks of the oldest part of Independence form the National Register of Historic Places-listed Independence Historic District.

The population was 9,828 at the 2020 census.

== History ==
Independence was founded by pioneers who migrated from Independence, Missouri. Elvin A. Thorp arrived in the Independence area in 1845 and staked a claim north of Ash Creek in June of that year. He platted a small townsite that later became known as "Thorp's Town of Independence" or the "Original Town of Independence", now known as "Old Town". Thorp named the town for his eponymous hometown in Missouri, as well as in honor of Andrew Jackson's characteristic of "Independence".

In 1847, Henry Hill came across the plains looking for a level piece of ground on which to raise stock. On November 14, 1847, he found his location on the west bank of the Willamette River (south of Ash Street) and marked off his donation land claim, which was 1 mile (1.6 km) square. In 1867, after returning from the California gold mines, Hill platted 40 acres (160,000 m^{2}) for a townsite, thereafter to be referred to as Henry Hill's Town of Independence. The city charter bill of February 26, 1885, incorporated E.A. Thorp's Independence and Henry Hill's Independence. Henry Hill Elementary School was named in honor of the latter.

Flood of 1861

When the pioneers first arrived in Independence, the Kalapuya people, who had lived in the area for centuries, warned them about the dangers of flooding along the Willamette River. The Kalapuya had experienced devastating floods in the past, which had even swept away their horses.

In December 1861, a devastating flood struck Independence, wiping out the town's commercial district, farms, and livestock. The flood was the result of a prolonged period of rain that began in October and continued into November, compounded by snow accumulation in the Cascades. As temperatures rose in late November, the snow melted, leading to severe flooding by the first week of December.

Mrs. Cora Hubbard, in her book Early Settlement of Independence, states that during the flood "a person could row a boat across Thorp’s entire Town of Independence." The flood destroyed much of the town's infrastructure, including warehouses, docks, and ferries along Water Street. A warehouse filled with wheat was also destroyed.

After the waters receded, the residents of Independence, along with Henry Hill returning from the California Gold Mines, began considering the possibility of rebuilding the town on higher ground, just across Ash Creek. They came up with a plan to establish a new townsite on more stable land. In 1867, Hill made the decision to move forward with the plan, choosing a 40-acre plot of land that bordered the Willamette River south of Ash Creek to build his "Henry Hill's Town of Independence".

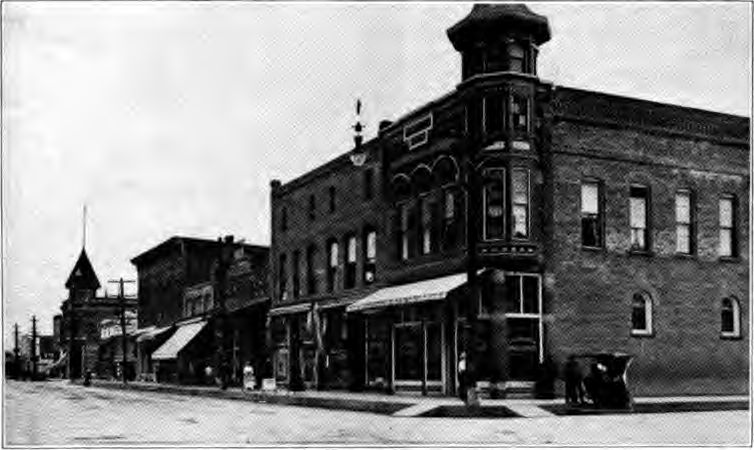
Downtown Independence c. 1920, with Independence National Bank visible at left.

Economic History and Transportation Development

Independence thrived as a shipping point, by both rail and boat, for agricultural products and lumber until the 1950s. The city was known for its hops production from the 1890s through the 1940s, hosting a festival called the "Hops Fiesta" from the early 1930s to the mid-1950s. When hop production began to decline in the early 1950s, the city's fortunes also began to decline.

Downtown Independence was bypassed by major freeways in the 1960s, though the period saw an alternative form of transportation enabled by the construction of the Independence State Airport, which was dedicated on August 14, 1964.

== Geography ==
Independence is located at 44°51′11″N 123°11′29″W. According to the United States Census Bureau, the city has a total area of 2.82 square miles (7.30 km^{2}), of which 2.73 square miles (7.07 km^{2}) is land and 0.09 square miles (0.23 km^{2}) is water. Ash Creek flows through Independence, where it meets the Willamette River.

== Demographics ==
Historical population
Census	Pop.	Note	%±
1860	425		—
1880	691		—
1900	909		—
1910	1,160		27.6%
1920	1,148		−1.0%
1930	1,248		8.7%
1940	1,372		9.9%
1950	1,987		44.8%
1960	1,930		−2.9%
1970	2,594		34.4%
1980	4,024		55.1%
1990	4,425		10.0%
2000	6,035		36.4%
2010	8,590		42.3%
2020	9,828		14.4%
U.S. Decennial Census

=== 2020 census ===
As of the 2020 census, Independence had a population of 9,828. The median age was 31.8 years. 26.9% of residents were under the age of 18 and 12.7% of residents were 65 years of age or older. For every 100 females there were 97.5 males, and for every 100 females age 18 and over there were 96.1 males age 18 and over.

99.7% of residents lived in urban areas, while 0.3% lived in rural areas.

There were 3,335 households in Independence, of which 38.7% had children under the age of 18 living in them. Of all households, 49.2% were married-couple households, 15.7% were households with a male householder and no spouse or partner present, and 24.2% were households with a female householder and no spouse or partner present. About 18.5% of all households were made up of individuals and 6.5% had someone living alone who was 65 years of age or older.

There were 3,466 housing units, of which 3.8% were vacant. Among occupied housing units, 55.5% were owner-occupied and 44.5% were renter-occupied. The homeowner vacancy rate was 0.7% and the rental vacancy rate was 4.4%.

Racial composition as of the 2020 census
Race	Number	Percent
White	6,392	65.0%
Black or African American	74	0.8%
American Indian and Alaska Native	161	1.6%
Asian	91	0.9%
Native Hawaiian and Other Pacific Islander	34	0.3%
Some other race	1,665	16.9%
Two or more races	1,411	14.4%
Hispanic or Latino (of any race)	3,388	34.5%

=== 2010 census ===
As of the census of 2010, there were 8,590 people, 2,857 households, and 2,021 families residing in the city. The population density was 3,146.5 inhabitants per square mile (1,214.9/km^{2}). There were 3,168 housing units at an average density of 1,160.4 per square mile (448.0/km^{2}). The racial makeup of the city was 73.3% White, 0.4% African American, 1.8% Native American, 1.2% Asian, 0.2% Pacific Islander, 19.1% from other races, and 4.1% from two or more races. Hispanic or Latino of any race were 35.3% of the population.

There were 2,857 households, of which 42.0% had children under the age of 18 living with them, 51.6% were married couples living together, 12.7% had a female householder with no husband present, 6.5% had a male householder with no wife present, and 29.3% were non-families. 18.6% of all households were made up of individuals, and 5.9% had someone living alone who was 65 years of age or older. The average household size was 2.99 and the average family size was 3.45.

The median age in the city was 28.3 years. 30.5% of residents were under the age of 18; 13.9% were between the ages of 18 and 24; 27.3% were from 25 to 44; 19.5% were from 45 to 64; and 8.7% were 65 years of age or older. The gender makeup of the city was 50.4% male and 49.6% female.

=== 2000 census ===
As of the census of 2000, there were 6,035 people, 1,994 households, and 1,425 families residing in the city. The population density was 2,585.8 inhabitants per square mile (998.4/km^{2}). There were 2,131 housing units at an average density of 913.1 per square mile (352.5/km^{2}). The racial makeup of the city was 73.69% White, 1.49% Native American, 0.58% Asian, 0.41% African American, 0.36% Pacific Islander, 19.64% from other races, and 3.83% from two or more races. Hispanic or Latino of any race were 30.12% of the population.

There were 1,994 households, out of which 38.1% had children under the age of 18 living with them, 53.0% were married couples living together, 14.0% had a female householder with no husband present, and 28.5% were non-families. 18.4% of all households were made up of individuals, and 6.8% had someone living alone who was 65 years of age or older. The average household size was 2.98 and the average family size was 3.41.

In the city, the population was spread out, with 30.5% under the age of 18, 14.1% from 18 to 24, 26.4% from 25 to 44, 20.1% from 45 to 64, and 9.0% who were 65 years of age or older. The median age was 29 years. For every 100 females, there were 96.7 males. For every 100 females age 18 and over, there were 93.5 males.

The median income for a household in the city was $36,790, and the median income for a family was $40,466. Males had a median income of $30,253 versus $22,527 for females. The per capita income for the city was $13,933. About 14.6% of families and 16.9% of the population were below the poverty line, including 22.5% of those under age 18 and 7.4% of those age 65 or over.

== Education ==
Independence shares a school district (Central School District) with Monmouth. An elementary school (Independence), a middle school (Talmadge), and a high school (Central) are shared between the two cities.
