= National Register of Historic Places listings in Polk County, Oregon =

Location of Polk County in Oregon

This list presents the full set of buildings, structures, objects, sites, or districts designated on the National Register of Historic Places in Polk County, Oregon, United States, and offers brief descriptive information about each of them. The National Register recognizes places of national, state, or local historic significance across the United States. Out of over 90,000 National Register sites nationwide, Oregon is home to over 2,000, and 35 of those are found in Polk County.

This National Park Service list is complete through NPS recent listings posted April 24, 2026.

== Current listings ==
| | Name on the Register | Image | Date listed | Location | City or town | Description |
|---|---|---|---|---|---|---|
| 1 | Beulah Methodist Episcopal Church | Beulah Methodist Episcopal Church | December 31, 2002 (#02001638) | 242 North Main; 44°51′59″N 123°25′49″W | Falls City | |
| 2 | Harrison Brunk House | Harrison Brunk House | May 6, 1975 (#75001599) | Brunks Corner and Oregon Route 22; 44°56′01″N 123°08′48″W | Brunks Corner | |
| 3 | Burford-Stanley House | Burford-Stanley House | February 24, 2022 (#100007458) | 342 Monmouth Ave. South; 44°50′45″N 123°14′15″W | Monmouth | |
| 4 | James S. and Jennie M. Cooper House | James S. and Jennie M. Cooper House | February 22, 1988 (#88000092) | 242 D Street; 44°51′01″N 123°11′12″W | Independence | |
| 5 | Joseph and Priscilla Craven House | Joseph and Priscilla Craven House | March 5, 1998 (#98000210) | 858 E. Main St. 44°50′56″N 123°13′30″W | Monmouth | |
| 6 | Dallas Cinema | Dallas Cinema | October 28, 2022 (#100008328) | 166 SE Mill St. 44°55′18″N 123°18′57″W | Dallas | |
| 7 | Dallas Downtown Historic District | Dallas Downtown Historic District | May 24, 2024 (#100010387) | Generally bounded by Washington, Church, Oak, and Jefferson streets. 44°55′17″N 123°19′00″W | Dallas | |
| 8 | Dallas Tannery | Dallas Tannery | November 6, 1980 (#80003379) | 505 SW Levens St. 44°55′32″N 123°19′09″W | Dallas | No longer extant per Google Street View. |
| 9 | Dr. John E. and Mary D. Davidson House | Dr. John E. and Mary D. Davidson House | February 28, 1985 (#85000371) | 887 Monmouth St. 44°51′03″N 123°11′46″W | Independence | |
| 10 | Walter J. Domes House | Walter J. Domes House | March 9, 1990 (#90000373) | 8240 Pacific Hwy. W. 45°03′14″N 123°12′24″W | Rickreall | |
| 11 | Kersey C. Eldridge House | Kersey C. Eldridge House | July 14, 1988 (#88001040) | 675 Monmouth St. 44°51′03″N 123°11′36″W | Independence | |
| 12 | Fort Yamhill Site | Fort Yamhill Site | July 27, 1971 (#71000681) | 32130–37008 3 Rivers Highway; 45°04′08″N 123°34′12″W | Grand Ronde | |
| 13 | Grand Ronde Rail Depot | Grand Ronde Rail Depot | December 26, 2012 (#12001092) | 8615 Grand Ronde Road; 45°03′36″N 123°36′39″W | Grand Ronde | |
| 14 | Graves–Fisher–Strong House | Graves–Fisher–Strong House | June 20, 1985 (#85001336) | 391 E. Jackson St. 44°50′59″N 123°13′51″W | Monmouth | |
| 15 | Jesse and Julia Harritt House | Jesse and Julia Harritt House | April 2, 1999 (#99000356) | 2280 Wallace Rd. NW; 44°58′00″N 123°03′28″W | Salem | |
| 16 | Sarah Helmick State Park | Sarah Helmick State Park | May 9, 2022 (#100007759) | 10485 Helmick Rd. 44°46′54″N 123°14′16″W | Monmouth vicinity | |
| 17 | John W. Howell House | John W. Howell House | September 10, 1987 (#87001536) | 212 N. Knox St. 44°50′59″N 123°13′59″W | Monmouth | |
| 18 | Independence Historic District | Independence Historic District | March 1, 1989 (#89000048) | Roughly bounded by Butler, Main, G, and Ninth Sts. 44°51′02″N 123°11′23″W | Independence | |
| 19 | Independence National Bank | Independence National Bank | November 6, 1986 (#86003182) | 302 S. Main St. 44°51′04″N 123°11′05″W | Independence | |
| 20 | Parker School | Parker School | June 16, 1989 (#89000514) | 8900 Parker Rd. 44°46′47″N 123°12′38″W | Independence | |
| 21 | John Phillips House | John Phillips House | March 15, 1976 (#76001588) | Northwest of Salem on Spring Valley Rd. 45°01′40″N 123°07′29″W | Salem | |
| 22 | Polk County Bank | Polk County Bank | November 6, 1986 (#86003179) | 295 E. Main St. 44°50′54″N 123°13′55″W | Monmouth | |
| 23 | Riley–Cutler House | Riley–Cutler House | April 3, 1980 (#80003380) | 11510 Pedee Creek Rd. 44°46′06″N 123°26′44″W | Monmouth vicinity | |
| 24 | Ritner Creek Bridge | Ritner Creek Bridge | November 29, 1979 (#79002147) | South of Pedee; 44°43′44″N 123°26′28″W | Monmouth | |
| 25 | Saint Patrick's Roman Catholic Church | Saint Patrick's Roman Catholic Church | February 5, 1987 (#87000040) | 330 Monmouth St. 44°51′05″N 123°11′16″W | Independence | |
| 26 | Edward W. St. Pierre House | Edward W. St. Pierre House | February 21, 1989 (#89000050) | 2425 Eola Dr. 44°56′40″N 123°04′55″W | Salem | |
| 27 | Salem Substation, Bonneville Power Administration | | April 14, 2025 (#100011672) | 3105 Dallas Highway (OR 22); 44°55′52″N 123°05′24″W | Salem | |
| 28 | Eleanor Sherman House | Eleanor Sherman House | February 21, 1989 (#89000054) | 175 N. Craven St. 44°50′58″N 123°13′31″W | Monmouth | |
| 29 | Spring Valley Presbyterian Church | Spring Valley Presbyterian Church | May 15, 1974 (#74001717) | Southeast of McCoy; 45°00′46″N 123°07′43″W | Salem vicinity | |
| 30 | Spring Valley School | Spring Valley School | February 9, 2018 (#100002097) | 8295 Spring Valley Road NW; 45°03′14″N 123°05′55″W | Zena | |
| 31 | Union Street Railroad Bridge and Trestle | Union Street Railroad Bridge and Trestle | January 11, 2006 (#05001520) | Junction of Union and Water Streets, NE (See also Marion County.); 44°56′50″N 123°02′31″W | Salem | |
| 32 | George A. Wells Jr. House | George A. Wells Jr. House | December 22, 1981 (#81000521) | 10635 Buena Vista Rd. 44°46′47″N 123°09′05″W | Independence | |
| 33 | Old West Salem City Hall | Old West Salem City Hall | June 1, 1990 (#90000841) | 1320 Edgewater St. NW; 44°56′23″N 123°03′33″W | Salem | |
| 34 | J. A. Wheeler House | J. A. Wheeler House | November 6, 1986 (#86003177) | 386 Monmouth St. 44°51′05″N 123°11′19″W | Independence | |
| 35 | A. K. Wilson Building | A. K. Wilson Building | July 31, 1998 (#98000952) | 887 Main St. 44°55′14″N 123°19′01″W | Dallas | |

== Former listings ==
| | Name on the Register | Image | Date listed | Date removed | Location | City or town | Description |
|---|---|---|---|---|---|---|---|
| 1 | Pumping Station Bridge | Pumping Station Bridge | November 29, 1979 (#79002146) | May 18, 1987 | SW of Ellendale | Ellendale vicinity | Collapsed during a flood on November 24, 1986. |

== See also ==
- National Register of Historic Places listings in Oregon
- Listings in neighboring counties: Benton, Lincoln, Linn, Marion, Tillamook, Yamhill
- Historic preservation
- History of Oregon
- Lists of Oregon-related topics
