= Washington (1851 steamboat) =

1800s steamboat

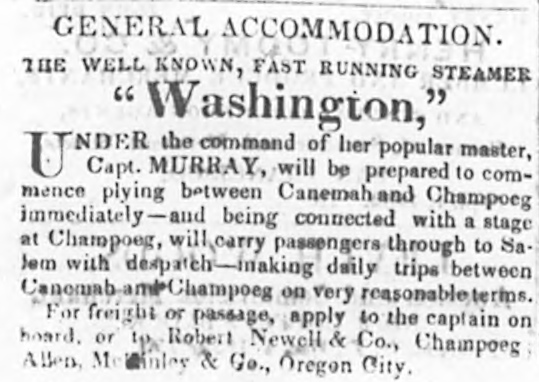
- 1852 newspaper advertisement for Washington

History
- Name: Washington
- Owner: known: Alexander S. Murray; S.D. Hinsdale; Allan, McKinlay & Co
- Route: Sacramento River, Willamette River, Umpqua River, (reported: Coos Bay, Coquille River)
- In service: 1851
- Out of service: December 12, 1857
- Fate: Destroyed by boiler explosion near Scottsburg, Oregon.

General characteristics
- Type: iron-hulled inland/coastal steamboat.
- Tonnage: 20 tons
- Length: 40 ft (12.2 m)
- Beam: 8 ft (2.4 m)
- Depth: 4 ft (1.2 m)
- Installed power: steam engine
- Propulsion: propeller

Washington was an early steamboat operated in the states of California and Oregon. Washington was built in California and was initially operated on the Sacramento River. In 1851, the steamer was purchased and brought on a ship to the Oregon Territory, where it was operated on the Willamette River until the summer of 1853. Washington was sold again, and then transferred to the Oregon coast, where it operated on the Umpqua River, on the Coquille River and on Coos Bay. Washington was able to operate for shorter distances over the open ocean along the Oregon coast. The steamer was wrecked by a boiler explosion in December 1857, near Scottsburg, O.T., on the Umpqua river.

== Design ==
Washington had an iron hull and driven by twin propellers. It was capable of operating with a single propeller if one was damaged. Washington was 40 feet long with a beam of 8 feet and a depth of hold of 4 feet. Overall size of the Washington was 20 tons. It was manufactured in Philadelphia and shipped out to the west coast of the United States.

Propeller-driven vessels operated at a disadvantage on the Willamette. Sidewheel steamers did better in shallow water, as was often encountered on the upper Willamette and its navigable tributaries. Propellers had to be submerged to furnish power, and there was always the potential in low water of striking obstruction on the river bottom, which happened to the Washington at least once, in September 1851, on the lower Willamette river. This was less of a danger to the side-wheelers.

== Operations in California ==
Washington first operated in California on the Sacramento River. There the Washington was the first steamboat to ascend the Sacramento River from Sacramento to the mouth of the Feather River. She subsequently made regular trips to the landing there called Vernon.

Pioneer steamboat captain Alexander Sinclair Murray (1827-1914) bought the boat in 1851, and had it transported to Oregon on board the bark Success. Although an oceangoing vessel, Success was able to proceed up to Oregon City in June, 1851, covering, it was claimed, most of the distance on the river under sail. On June 5, 1851, the bark Success was reported to have arrived in the Columbia river, carrying two river boats, one a steamboat, and the other a propeller.

== Willamette River service ==
=== Operations on the upper Willamette ===
In early June 1851, Murray and some others investigated whether a small steamboat could be operated on the Tualatin river. Murray had Washington launched above Willamette Falls at Canemah and worked on the Willamette River to the Yamhill River. It was hoped that Washington could go as far up the Willamette as Corvallis, then known as Marysville.

Washington's first run up the Yamhill was on June 6, 1851. Washington remained this route for a time, seeking cargoes from the nearby wheat farms. With Washington in service, there were now two steamboats running on the Willamette river above the falls. Three steamboats were running below. Two years previously there had been no steamers at all on the Willamette. The main competition at this time against Washington was another propeller-driven steamer, the Hoosier. Washington was advertised as running from Canemah to Champoeg, where the boat would meet a connecting stage coach line for travellers bound for Salem, Oregon.

On June 19, 1851, Captain Murray was reported to have "arrived with his iron, steam propeller" apparently the Washington. Murray was reported to be confident of navigating to Salem at any time of the year. The arrival of the new steamer was praised by the editor of the Oregon City weekly newspaper, Oregon Spectator as a sign of progress.

On the morning of Thursday, June 26, 1851, Washington, with Capt. Murray in command, departed Oregon City on what was intend to be a run south to Corvallis, then known as Marysville. As of June 26, 1851 in addition to the two operating boats on the upper Willamette, the Hoosier and the newly arrived Washington, there was another belonging to Captain Bissel, which was expected to be compete in four or five weeks. The firm of Hedges & Barlow were building a new sidewheeler, the Canemah, which they expected to have running sometime in September.

On its first trip, Washington went up the Yamhill River to Dayton, where the boat's crew was well received. Washington remained at Dayton overnight, leaving the next morning for Salem, where they arrived at about 4:00 p.m on Friday, June 27.

Washington was also welcomed at Salem, where the citizens fired off a saluting cannon, and made firewood and other supplies available to the steamer free of charge. After about two hours at Salem, Washington proceeded further upstream to Cincinnati Landing, now known as Eola, where the boat was greeted by the proprietor of the place, A.C.R. Shaw.

Cincinnati was a small landing 3 miles west of Salem, in Polk County, 200 yards up Rickreall Creek, which was then known as the La Creole River. Washington under Captain Murray was the first steamboat to reach Eola.

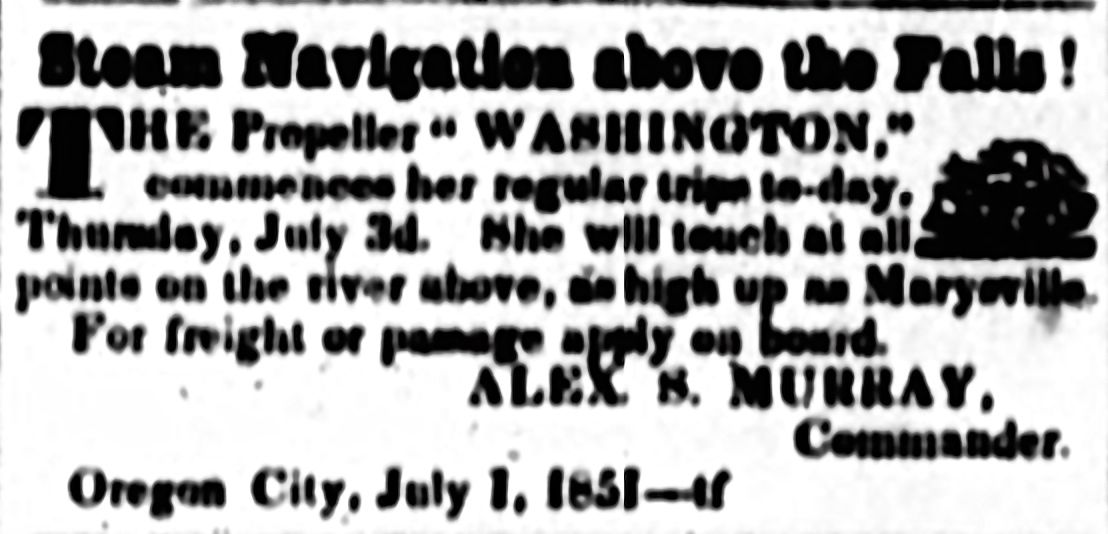
Advertisement for the steamer Washington, placed in the Oregon Spectator, July 22, 1851.

To facilitate steamboat service, the citizens of Cincinnati Landing went to the extent of digging a canal from the Willamette to the La Creole River. Washington was reported to have negotiated the canal without difficulty.

=== Low water problems ===
Murray had placed Washington into regular service on the river on July 3, 1851. In early July 1851, the river below the falls went down about 3.5 feet. While navigation was reported to be unimpeded, there was just 18 inches of water on the bars above the falls. Washington scrapped bottom in several places downriver from Salem, while the Hoosier was able to continue regular trips to Dayton. The upper river proved to be too shallow for Washington, and freight could be found elsewhere for the vessel.

=== Transfer to lower Willamette ===
In early August 1851, Washington was hauled around the falls to the lower Willamette river. The river at that time was said to be unusually low, but still 10 or 15 inches above extreme low water. The withdrawal of Washington left the Hoosier, for a time, as the only steamboat running on the upper Willamette.

On the lower Willamette Washington ran between Portland, Oregon, and Oregon City, joining a small flotilla of steamboats which included Eagle, Blackhawk, Major Redding, Allan and Columbia. Washington was the largest of the vessels running on the lower river at that time.

With very few people living in either Portland and Oregon City, competition was fierce. As of November 18, 1851, Washington was running regularly between Oregon City and Portland, carrying "large quantities" of freight to the landing at Oregon City below the falls, to be portaged there and then shipped to points on the upper river. Service above the falls as far as Marysville was then conducted by two sternwheelers, Canemah and Multnomah, each making one trip a week.

For a stretch of several days in mid-February, 1852, all steamboat service between Oregon City and Portland was suspended when both Washington and another iron-hulled propeller, the Eagle were taken off the route, apparently as a result of mechanical breakdowns.

=== Return to upper Willamette ===
In spring 1853, Washington was taken back above the falls, back to the upper Willamette river, where it was operated only a few months, until July 1853. Murray replaced Washington with a new wooden sidewheeler, the Portland.

== Sale to coastal interests ==
In July 1853, Washington was purchased for use on the Umpqua river by Allan, McKinlay & Co., an Oregon City concern which had a branch operation on the Umpqua. Pioneer steamboat man William H. Troup (1828–1882), the father of steamboat captains James and Claud Troup, went with Washington as the vessel's engineer.

Washington, then owned by Allan, McKinlay & Co, was rigged in schooner fashion for the voyage to the Umpqua. In mid-August 1853, Washington departed Oregon City for the Umpqua, where, if it arrived safely, it was to be used as a tow boat. No similar vessel was then in operation on that river. On August 26, 1853, it was reported in Oregon City that Washington had arrived safely and undamaged at Scottsburg, despite having encountered some heavy weather on the way.

== Umpqua River service ==
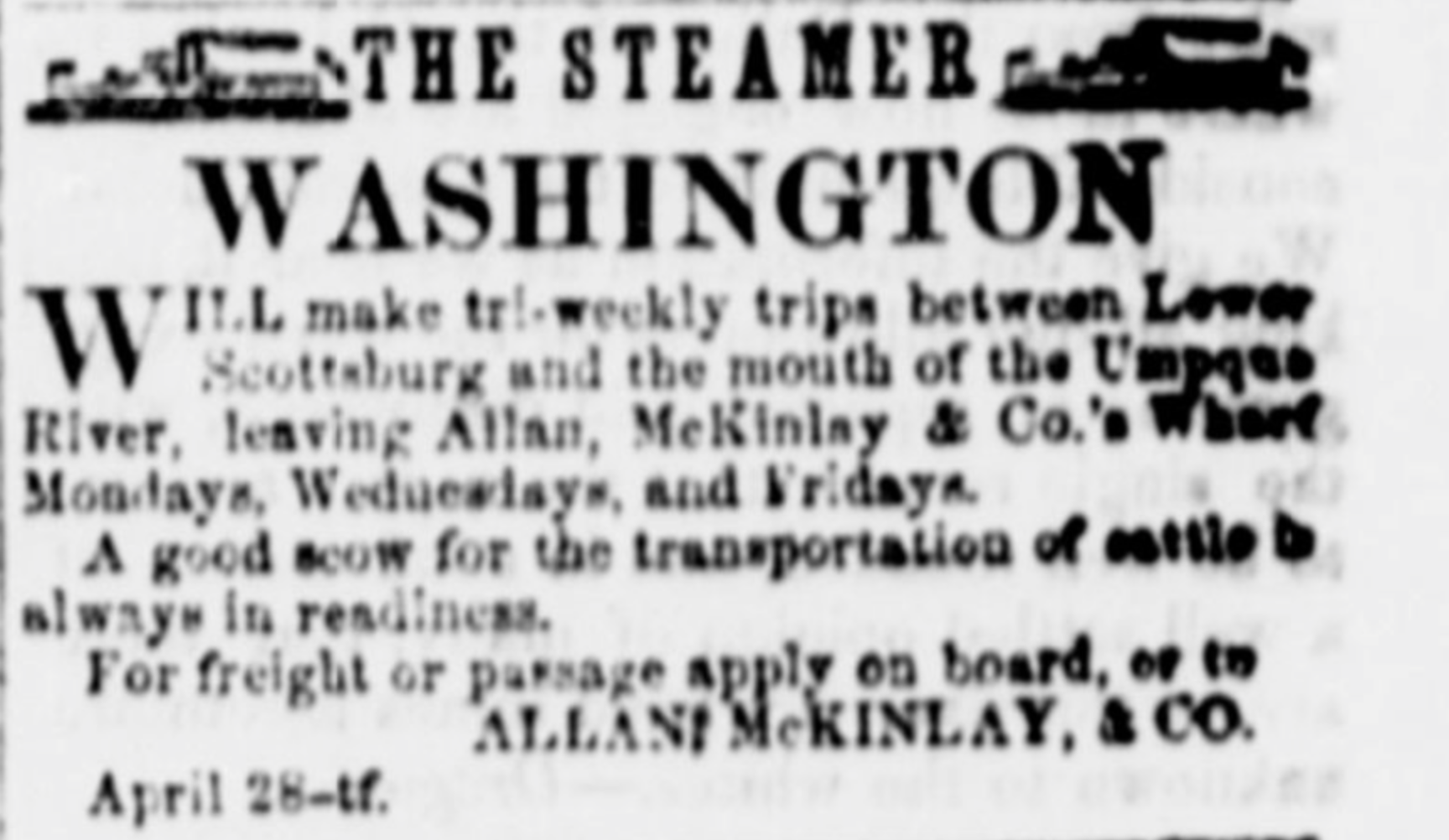
Advertisement for steamer Washington service on the Umpqua river, 1854

The head of navigation on the Umpqua River was a former Hudson's Bay Company outpost, called Scottsburg, O.T., In the mid-1850s, Scottsburg was the center of business and transport activity in southwestern Oregon. The population in this area was increasing due to incoming settlers and mining activity.

As of April 28, 1854, Washington made tri-weekly trips between Scottsburg and the mouth of the Umpqua River, departing from Allan, McKinlay & Company's wharf at Scottsburg on Mondays, Wednesdays and Fridays. The company's owners advertised that "a good scow for the transportation of cattle is always in readiness." One of Washington's owners was Capt. Sylvester Hinsdale (1824–1870), a former seaman and a merchant at Gardiner, Oregon, on the Umpqua River.

On November 11, 1854, Washington was placed on a winter schedule, running, under Capt. J.U. Harris from the Allan, McKinlay & Co. wharf in lower Scottsburf every Saturday evening, carrying the U.S. mails, to Gardiner, Providence, Winchester Bay (then known as Umpqua City), and Pyramid Rock. Washington returned to Scottsburg on Sunday morning, departing from Umpqua City at 8:00 a.m.

The boat was advertised as being ready to "meet vessels at all other times, and receive freight and passengers for every point within the bounds of navigation on the Umpqua river. Washington was still running on the winter schedule on February 24, 1855.

== Operations on the Coos and Coquille rivers ==
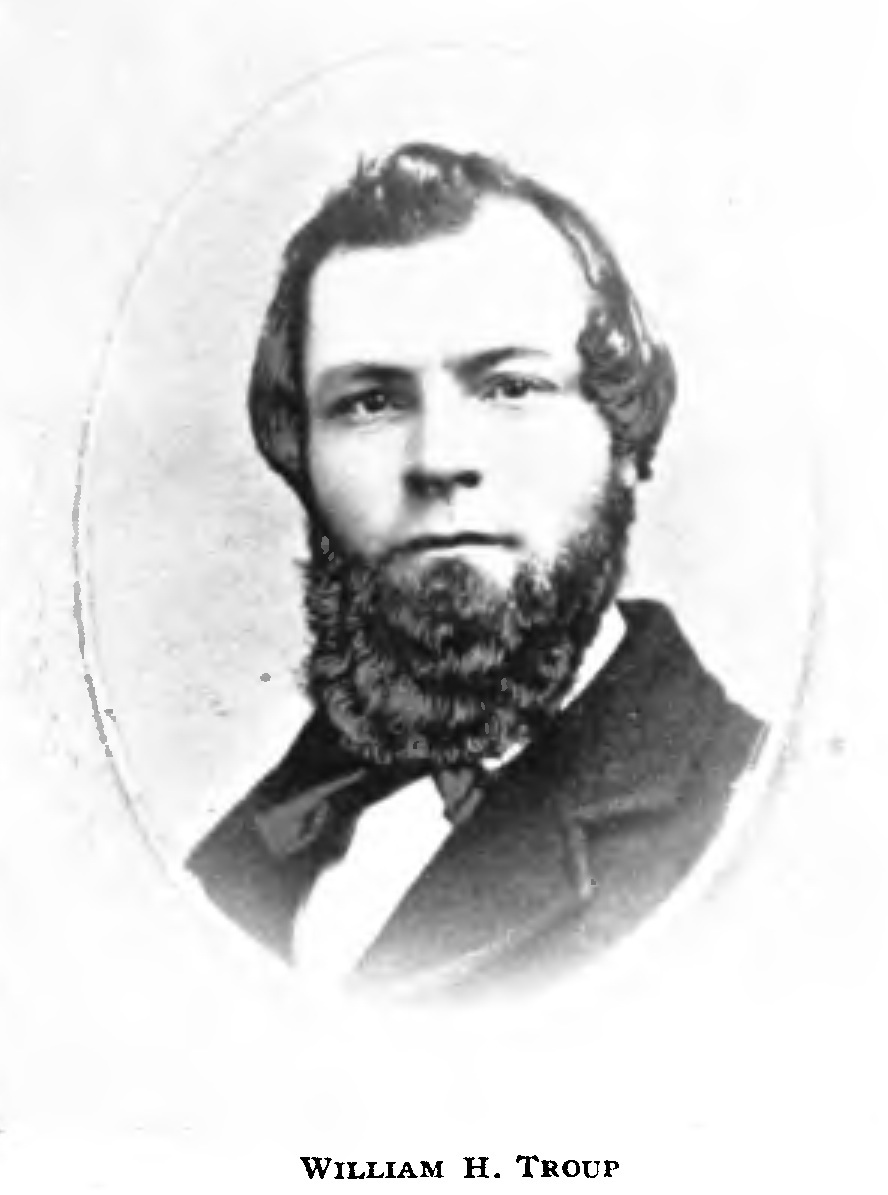
William H. Troup, engineer on the Washington

Washington was operated on Coos Bay, again with Wm. H. Troup as engineer, and for a short time on the Coquille River. Washington also ran on the open ocean in addition to riverine service.

On August 19, 1853, Washington departed Scottsburg, bound for Coos Bay. Washington reached Umpqua City, now known as Winchester Bay, near the mouth of the river that same day. The next day, Saturday, August 19, Washington tried to cross the bar of the Umpqua, but the weather was too rough. The next day however, Sunday, August 20, Washington was able to cross the bar and, despite bad weather during the voyage, reached and crossed the Coos Bay bar, and landed at the then newly founded town of Oregon. Washington was able to use coal from the Coos Bay coal fields rather than wood as fuel for the boiler.

== Boiler explosion ==
Washington's career terminated with a boiler explosion in December 1857. About noon on Saturday, December 12, 1857, the boiler exploded on Washington, scalding five persons who were on board. The extent of the injuries was not known at the time of the first report. The boat was reported to have been left "a total wreck. The incident occurred just downriver from Scottsburg. Washington was then the only steamer capable of transporting goods from Fort Umpqua to Scottsburg,
