= Lewis McArthur =

Lewis McArthur may refer to:

- Lewis Linn McArthur, American newspaper publisher, attorney, and state judge
- Lewis A. McArthur, American business executive, geographer, and author
