= Eola, Oregon =

Unincorporated community in the state of Oregon, United States

- Census-designated place (CDP)
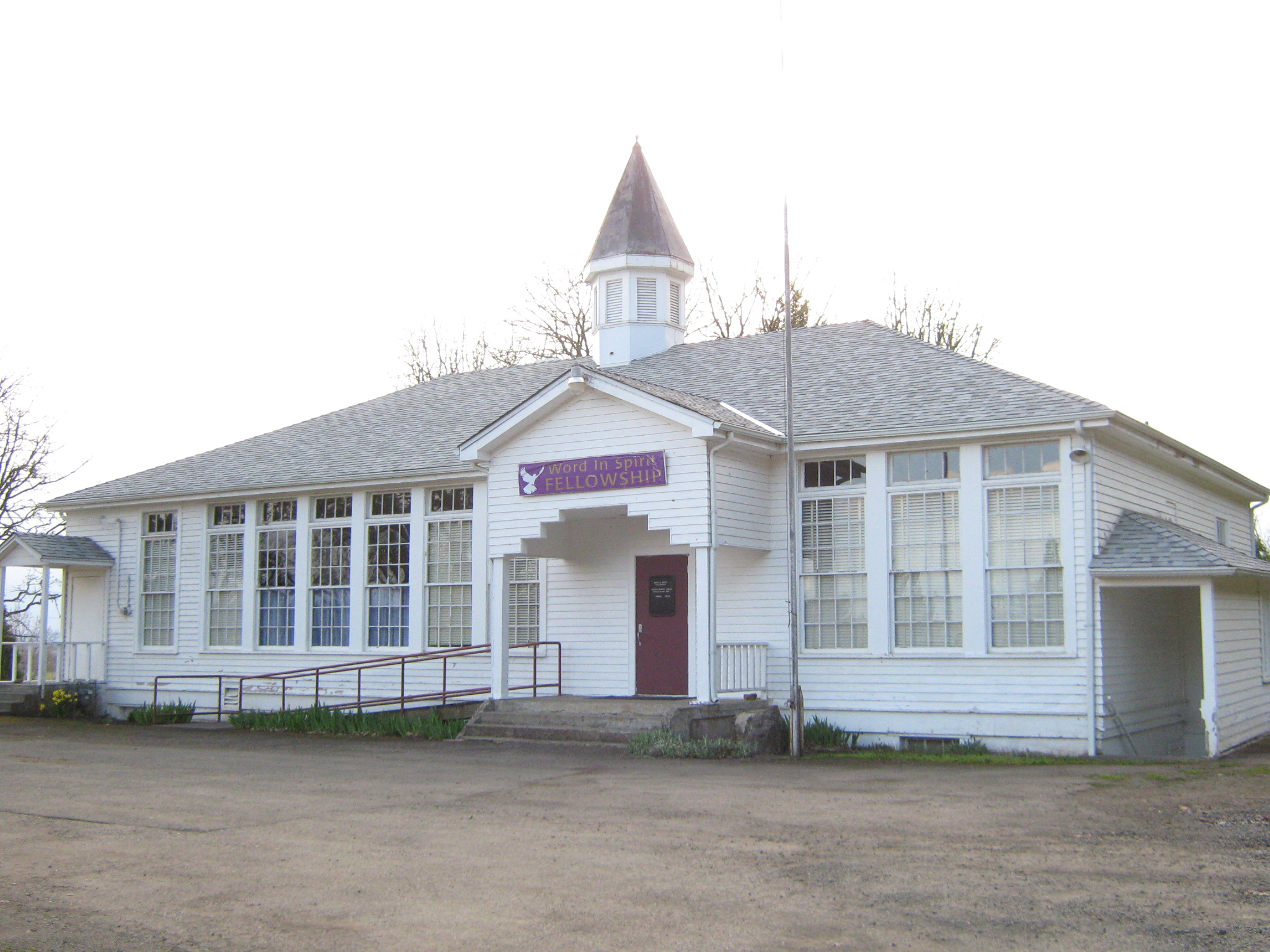
- Former 1937 school in Eola

- Location of Eola, Oregon
- Coordinates: 44°55′53″N 123°07′17″W
- Country: United States
- State: Oregon
- County: Polk

Area
  - Total: 0.062 sq mi (0.16 km^{2})
  - Land: 0.062 sq mi (0.16 km^{2})
  - Water: 0 sq mi (0.00 km^{2})
- Elevation: 203 ft (62 m)

Population (2020)
  - Total: 60
  - Density: 994.5/sq mi (383.96/km^{2})
- Time zone: UTC-8 (Pacific (PST))
  - Summer (DST): UTC-7 (PDT)
- FIPS code: 41-23550
- GNIS feature ID: 2408085, 1161035

Eola is an unincorporated community in Polk County, Oregon, United States. It lies four miles west of Salem on Oregon Route 22 at the confluence of Rickreall Creek and the Willamette River.

For statistical purposes, the United States Census Bureau has defined Eola as a census-designated place (CDP). The census definition of the area may not precisely correspond to local understanding of the area with the same name. The population of the CDP was 60 at the 2020 census. It is part of the Salem Metropolitan Statistical Area.

The Eola Hills rise north of the community and were named after it.

== History ==
Eola was originally named Cincinnati in 1844 by settlers Joshua "Sheep" Shaw and his son, A. C. R. Shaw, who thought the site resembled Cincinnati, Ohio, where Joshua once lived. Joshua Shaw earned his nickname by being the first person to bring sheep overland to the Oregon Country via the Oregon Trail, also in 1844.

Cincinnati post office was established in 1851, the first stop on a 70-mile mail route that included Nathaniel Ford's home in Rickreall and Nesmith's Mills at Ellendale.

The Oregon Territorial Legislature incorporated the community with the name "Eola" in 1856. The name comes from Aeolus, Greek god of the winds, though the reason for the name change is disputed.

Cincinnati post office was also renamed. Eola post office ran until 1901 and was later reestablished from 1955 to 1965.

The first school in Eola (then Cincinnati) was built in 1853. Miss Abigail J. Scott, best known by her married name as the suffragist Abigail Scott Duniway, was the first teacher. The original school burned down and was replaced by a school at Second and Mill streets in 1858. This school served the community until 1937, and at the time was the oldest schoolhouse still in use in the state. In 1937, a new school was built using a Works Progress Administration grant. This building served as a public school facility until 2003. Today the building is used as a church.

== Geography ==
According to the United States Census Bureau, the CDP has a total area of 0.1 square miles (0.26 km^{2}), all of it land.

== Demographics ==
Historical population
Census	Pop.	Note	%±
2020	60		—
U.S. Decennial Census

As of the census of 2000, there were 49 people, 29 households, and 6 families residing in the CDP. The population density was 767.0 inhabitants per square mile (296.1/km^{2}). There were 36 housing units at an average density of 563.5 per square mile (217.6/km^{2}). The racial makeup of the CDP was 89.80% White, 8.16% from other races, and 2.04% from two or more races. Hispanic or Latino of any race were 8.16% of the population.

There were 29 households, out of which 3.4% had children under the age of 18 living with them, 20.7% were married couples living together, and 75.9% were non-families. 69.0% of all households were made up of individuals, and 13.8% had someone living alone who was 65 years of age or older. The average household size was 1.69 and the average family size was 3.14.

In the CDP, the population was spread out, with 10.2% under the age of 18, 4.1% from 18 to 24, 26.5% from 25 to 44, 49.0% from 45 to 64, and 10.2% who were 65 years of age or older. The median age was 50 years. For every 100 females, there were 122.7 males. For every 100 females age 18 and over, there were 131.6 males.

The median income for a household in the CDP was $12,361 and the per capita income was $9,489. There were no families and 29.8% of the population living below the poverty line, including no people under eighteen and none of those over 64.
