= Lewis Linn McArthur =

American judge

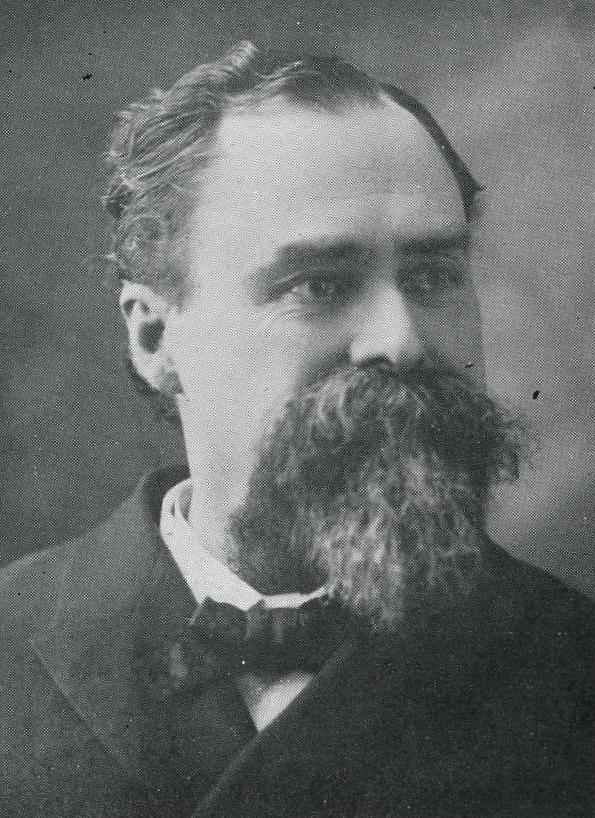

20th Justice of the Oregon Supreme Court
- In office 1870–1878
- Preceded by: Benoni Whitten
- Succeeded by: position eliminated

Personal details
- Born: March 18, 1843 Virginia
- Died: May 10, 1897 (aged 54) Portland, Oregon
- Spouse: Harriet K. Nesmith

Lewis Linn McArthur (March 18, 1843 – May 10, 1897) was known as an American newspaper publisher, attorney, and state judge in Oregon. He served as a justice of the Oregon Supreme Court from 1870 to 1878.

His son Clifton Nesmith McArthur also became an attorney and served in the United States Congress. His second son, Lewis A. McArthur, was the first editor of the Oregon Geographic Names publications.

== Early life ==
Lewis McArthur was born on March 18, 1843, in Portsmouth, Virginia. His father was a US naval officer and hydrologist, Lieutenant Commander William Pope McArthur, and his mother was Mary Stone (Young) McArthur. McArthur's father died at sea in 1850 while returning from a United States Coast Survey mission to survey the Oregon Coast. His father was the nephew of Missouri Senator Lewis F. Linn. Lewis McArthur grew up in Portsmouth and Baltimore, Maryland. He attended Dickinson College in Carlisle, Pennsylvania, in the class of 1861. He was briefly imprisoned in Washington as a Confederate spy in 1861, but was released in 1862. He was admitted to the bar in York County, Maine in 1864, and later that year he moved to Oregon to set up a practice in the developing state.

Once in Oregon, Mcarthur began working for various newspapers in Eastern Oregon before founding the Bedrock Democrat in 1870 at Baker City. He was the first city recorder for Umatilla, Oregon, after its incorporation. During this time, McArthur conducted some mining and also practiced law.

== Judicial career ==
In 1870, McArthur won election to the Oregon Supreme Court. He was re-elected in 1876 to the state’s high court, but the term ended in 1878. That year the legislature reduced the number of sitting justices from five to three. Prior to 1878, Supreme Court justices rode circuit and sat on the Supreme Court bench. In 1878, the legislature split off the circuit court, and Supreme Court justices were given separate responsibilities.

McArthur returned to the bench as a circuit court judge in 1883, serving until 1886. In 1886, he was appointed as the United States Attorney for the state of Oregon, serving until 1890.

== Later life ==
McArthur married Harriet K. Nesmith in 1878. Harriet was the daughter of Oregon Senator James W. Nesmith. They had two sons, Clifton Nesmith McArthur and Lewis A. McArthur. From 1890 until his death, Lewis Linn McArthur practiced law in Portland, Oregon. He died in Portland on May 10, 1897.

Clifton McArthur became an attorney and a politician, being elected to the US Congress from Oregon. He was the namesake for McArthur Court at the University of Oregon. Lewis A. McArthur started the Oregon Geographic Names series.
