= Lewis A. McArthur =

American historian

- Tam McArthur
- Born: April 27, 1883; The Dalles, Oregon, USA
- Died: November 8, 1951 (aged 68); Portland, Oregon, USA
- Occupations: Business executive, geographer, and author
- Children: Lewis L. McArthur
- Writing career
- Genre: Geography
- Subject: Toponymy
- Notable work: Oregon Geographic Names (first published in 1928)

Lewis Ankeny McArthur (April 27, 1883 – November 8, 1951), known as "Tam" McArthur, was an executive for Pacific Power and Light Company. He was also the secretary for the Oregon Geographic Board for many years and the author of Oregon Geographic Names. His book, now in its seventh edition, is a comprehensive source of information on the origins and history of Oregon place names. It is a standard reference book in libraries throughout Oregon and the Pacific Northwest. Tam McArthur Rim in the Cascade Mountains is named in his honor.

== Personal life ==
McArthur was born on April 27, 1883, in The Dalles, Oregon. He grew up on a farm near Rickreall. His family later moved to Portland, where he attended Portland Academy. His family had long been associated with Oregon history and government. His paternal grandfather, Navy Lieutenant William P. McArthur, had conducted the first survey of the Pacific Coast for the United States Coast Survey in 1849 and 1850. His maternal grandfather, James W. Nesmith, arrived in Oregon in 1843 and played an important role in territorial and early state government, serving as one of Oregon’s United States senators from 1861 to 1867 and as a member of the United States House of Representatives from 1873 to 1875. His father, Lewis Linn McArthur, served as a justice of the Oregon Supreme Court from 1870 to 1878 and then as the United States Attorney for the State of Oregon. His mother, Harriet Nesmith McArthur, organized of the Oregon Historical Society and served on its board from 1898 until 1924.

McArthur attended University of California, graduating in 1908. During his college years, he worked for The Oregonian newspaper during the summer. After graduation, he got a job with the Oregon Electric Railway. In 1910, McArthur went to work for the Pacific Power and Light Company, as one of its first employees. By 1923, he was appointed vice-president and general manager. He continued with the company until his retirement in 1946. McArthur also served as president of the Oregon Historical Society from 1937 until 1945. He died in Portland on November 8, 1951.

== Geographic historian ==
McArthur's official connection with Oregon geography began when Governor Oswald West appointed him to the Oregon Geographic Board (now the Oregon Geographic Names Board) in 1914. Two years later, he was elected board secretary. He served in that position until 1949, when he resigned after 35 years on the board. McArthur’s position on the Oregon Geographic Board allowed him the opportunity to research the history of Oregon place names using a wide range of sources. He studied the journals of early explorers, read pioneer diaries, browsed newspapers archives, researched government documents, and thoroughly reviewed every book on Oregon history he could find. He also conducted personal interviews with pioneer Oregonians who were still living at the time.

The Oregon Historical Society published his research in eight issues of the Oregon Historical Quarterly in the early 1920s. In 1928, McArthur paid to have the first edition of Oregon Geographic Names published. The book was quickly recognized as the authoritative source for information regarding the origins and history of Oregon place names. A second edition was published in 1944. In that edition, McArthur added a great deal of new information about Oregon post offices and abandoned settlement sites. The book’s third edition was published in 1951, shortly after his death.

== Legacy ==
Today, Oregon Geographic Names remains the authoritative source for information on the origins and history of Oregon place names. After McArthur’s death, his son, Lewis L. McArthur, continued his work, publishing the fourth through seventh editions of his book. The seventh edition of Oregon Geographic Names was published by the Oregon Historical Society in 2003. It contains information on over 6,200 Oregon geographic features and communities throughout the state including early settlements that no longer exist.

After his death, the United States Board on Geographic Names named Tam McArthur Rim in his honor. The rim is a prominent ridge with a high cliff face located on the east side of the Cascade Mountains in Deschutes County, Oregon. Tam Lake in Central Oregon is also named for McArthur.
