= William Pope McArthur =

American naval officer and hydrologist

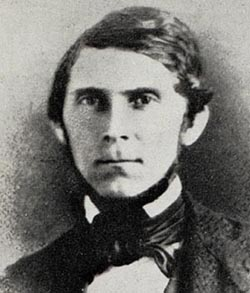
- Born: April 2, 1814; Ste. Genevieve, Missouri
- Died: December 23, 1850 (aged 36); At sea
- Relatives: Clifton N. McArthur & Lewis Linn McArthur (sons), Lewis A. McArthur (grandson), Lewis L. McArthur (great grandson)
- Military career
- Branch: United States Navy
- Service years: 1832–1850
- Rank: Lieutenant commander
- Unit: U.S. Coast Survey
- Commands: USS Consort; US survey schooner Ewing
- Conflicts: Second Seminole War

William Pope McArthur (April 2, 1814 – December 23, 1850) was an American naval officer and hydrologist who was involved in the first surveys of the Pacific Coast for the United States Coast Survey.

== Early life ==
McArthur was born in Ste. Genevieve, Missouri to John and Mary (Linn) McArthur. McArthur's maternal uncle, Dr. Lewis F. Linn, was U.S. Senator for Missouri. At Linn's request, McArthur was appointed midshipman in the United States Navy on February 11, 1832. In 1837 he attended the Naval School at Norfolk, Virginia.

During the Second Seminole War (1837–1838), McArthur was promoted to the temporary rank of lieutenant and placed in command of a small craft. Among the passengers was Joseph E. Johnston, who accompanied the vessel as a civilian topographical engineer. Johnston later served as a general in the United States Army and then the Confederate States Army during the American Civil War.

McArthur was wounded in both legs by Seminoles at Jupiter, Florida. While one musket ball was pulled from one leg, a ball remained in the other leg. He was sent to the Naval Hospital in Norfolk, Virginia, for treatment and convalescence. There he met, courted, and married Mary Stone Young, the daughter of the superintendent of the hospital. Among their children was Lewis Linn McArthur, an Oregon Supreme Court justice.

In 1840 he began a survey of the Gulf Of Mexico aboard the brig USS Consort.

== Survey of the Pacific Coast ==
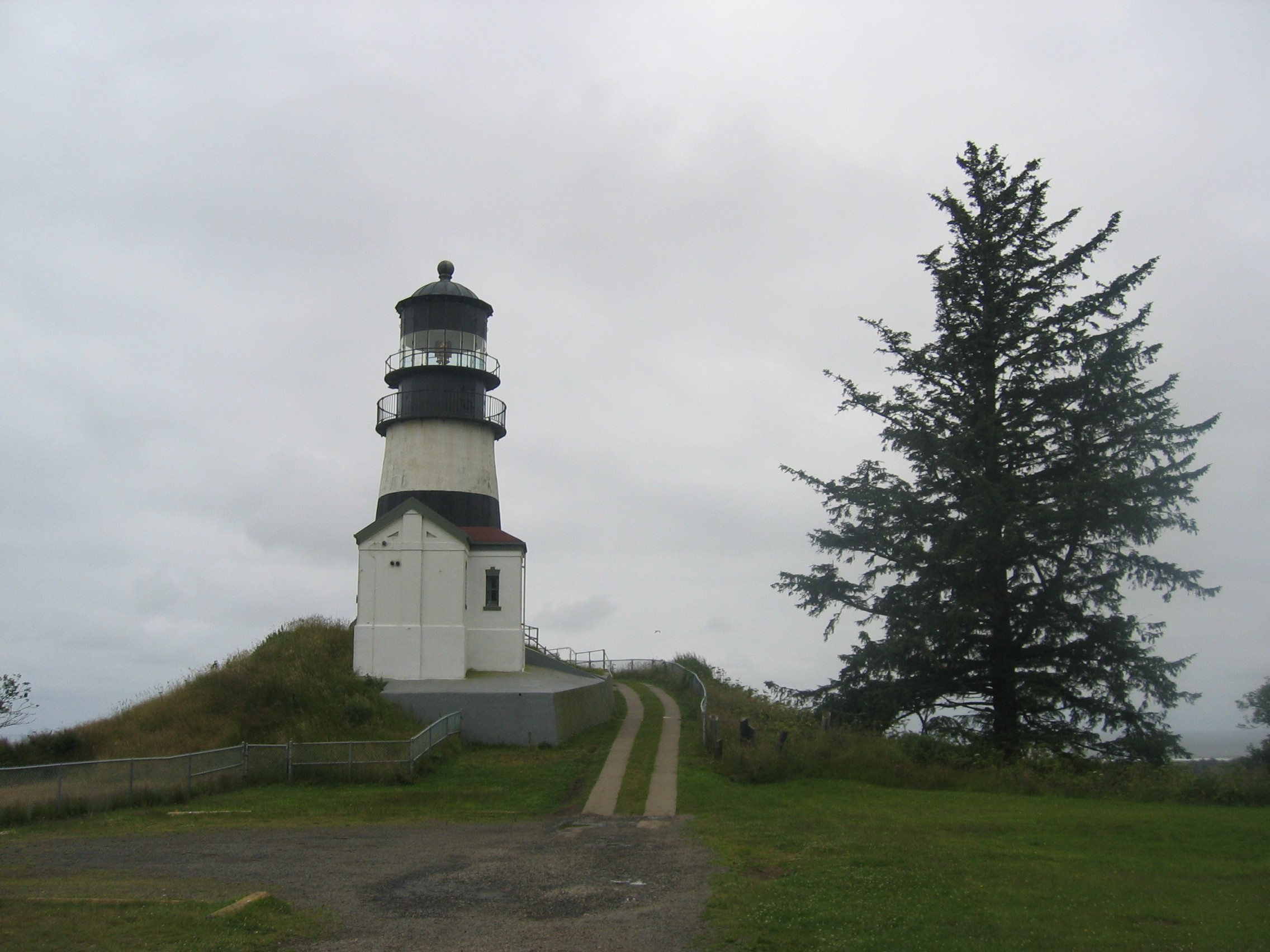
Cape Disappointment Lighthouse

On October 27, 1848, A. D. Bache, Superintendent of the United States Coast Survey, instructed McArthur to go to San Francisco, California, to begin "the survey of the Western Coast of the United States."

After sailing from New York, McArthur was delayed in Panama by the influx of settlers in the California Gold Rush. In Panama, McArthur was asked to captain a former coal storage ship to San Francisco. The von Humboldt left Panama on May 21, 1849 and took 102 days to arrive at San Francisco, the first 46 of which were spent getting to the Mexican port of Acapulco. Among the four hundred passengers on von Humboldt were Collis P. Huntington, the future president of the Southern Pacific Railroad and San Francisco Society portrait painter Stephen W. Shaw.

In September 1849, Lieutenant Commander McArthur was placed in command of the U.S. survey schooner Ewing which had been brought around the Cape Horn to the United States West Coast by Lieutenant Washington Allon Bartlett. Upon reaching San Francisco, the Ewing and the USS Massachusetts were hampered from progress in the survey due to desertions of their crews who joined the gold rush, including a mutiny when crew members rowing into the city from the Ewing threw an officer overboard in an attempt to desert to flee to the gold fields. They managed to survey Mare Island Strait before steaming to Hawaii to obtain crewmen from Hawaiian monarch King Kamehameha III. They returned to San Francisco in the spring of 1850, with the coastal survey of northern California beginning on April 3, 1850, and continuing up the coast of Oregon to the mouth of the Columbia River. On August 1, 1850, while still in Oregon, McArthur purchased a 1/16 interest in Mare Island for $468.50, then returned to San Francisco later that month to prepare charts and write reports.

=== Cape Disappointment and Cape Flattery Lighthouses ===
In 1848, Congress had appropriated funds for two lighthouses in the act creating the Oregon Territory. McArthur was to recommend placing one at Cape Disappointment on the Columbia and one at Cape Flattery at the entrance to Puget Sound. In his report, McArthur wrote:

The greatly increasing commerce of Oregon demands that these improvements be made immediately… Within the last eighteen months more vessels have crossed the Columbia river bar than had crossed it, perhaps, in all time past.

=== Oregon Territory ===
McArthur and some of his shipmates were quite taken with Oregon and the Willamette Valley, he wrote:

The climate is agreeable and healthy. The water is not inferior to any in the world. The face of the country is too uneven to permit as general cultivation, still it will and must soon become a great agricultural and stock growing country. The scenery is beautiful and in some places and some points of view the grandest that the eye ever beheld.

Lieutenant Blunt who accompanied him on the expedition even made a land claim on behalf of himself, McArthur and Bartlett. McArthur's uncle, Senator Linn, along with Senator Thomas Hart Benton, had been an advocate of American expansion in the West.

== Death ==
McArthur was not to survive the voyage to the United States East Coast in 1850. He became ill on board with dysentery, died, and was buried in Panama. The U.S. Navy purchased the original 956 acres (387 ha) of the Mare Island Naval Shipyard on January 4, 1853. McArthur's family share was $5,218.20. in 1867, his body was disinterred and he was reburied on Mare Island.

== Namesakes ==
McArthur's name is applied to several ships and geographic features.

=== Ships ===
- McArthur, a schooner launched in 1876
- USC&GS McArthur, a survey ship in service in the United States Coast Survey from 1876 to 1878 and in the United States Coast and Geodetic Survey (USC&GS) from 1878 to 1915
- SS William P. Mcarthur, a Liberty ship launched in 1942
- USC&GS McArthur (MSS 22), later NOAAS McArthur (S 330), a survey ship in service in the USC&GS from 1966 to 1970 and in the National Oceanic and Atmospheric Administration (NOAA) from 1970 to 2003; since 2006 a Blackwater vessel M/V McArthur
- NOAAS McArthur II (R 330), an oceanographic research ship in service in NOAA since 2003

Infrastructure

• The MacArthur Lock, built in 1943. It is 800 ft long, 80 ft wide, 29.5 ft deep. Decommissioned in 2010. Located on the US side of the St. Mary’s river in Sault Ste. Marie MI.

=== Geographic features ===
- McArthur Peak, a 2,239-foot (682 m) mountain on Kuiu Island in Alaska
- McArthur Reef, a reef in the Sumner Strait off Clarence Strait in Alaska
