= Pumping Station Bridge =

Covered bridge in the U.S. state of Oregon

- Formerly listed on the U.S. National Register of Historic Places
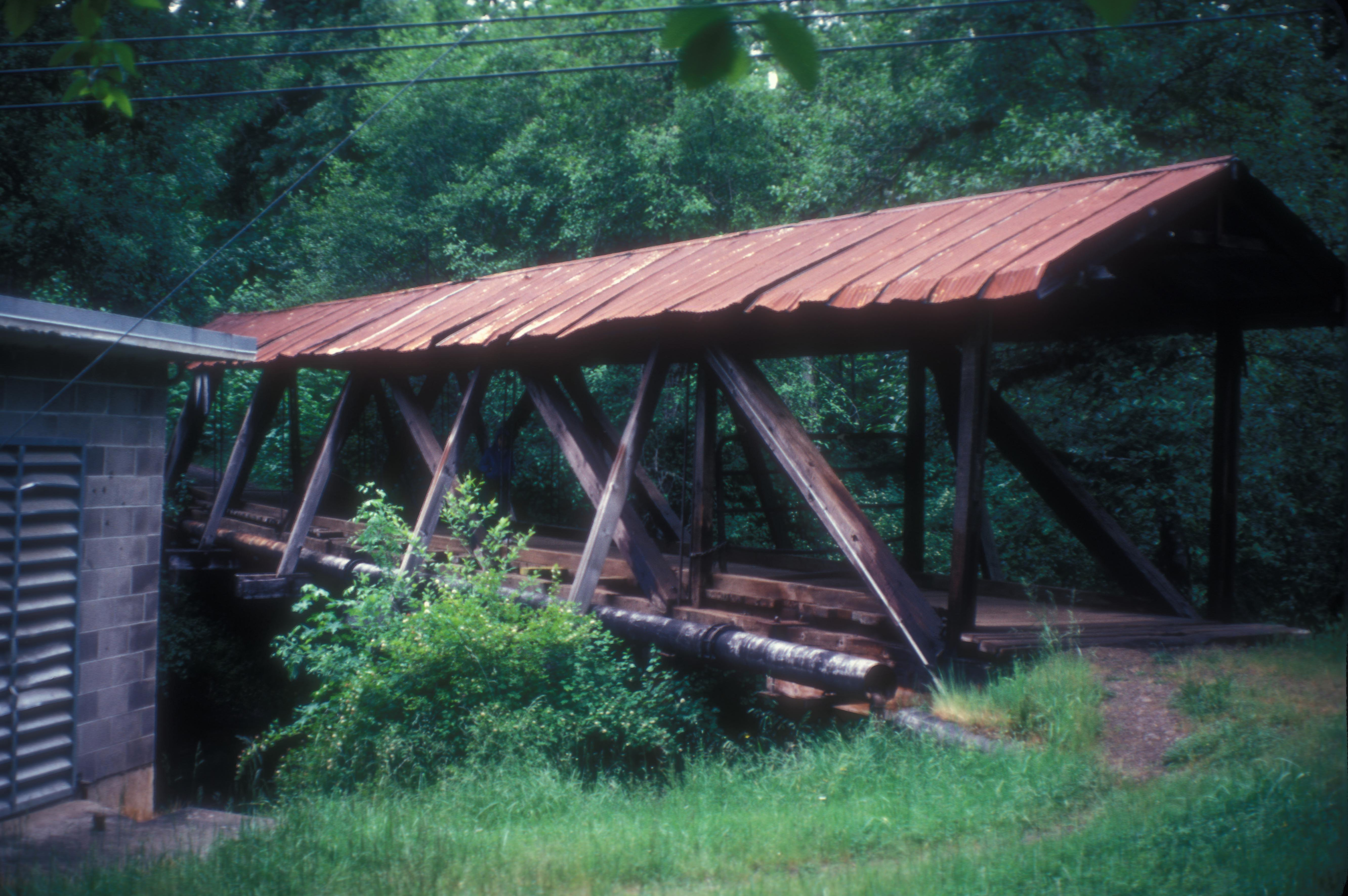

- Location within Oregon Location within the United States
- Location: Rickreall Creek, Oregon
- Nearest city: Ellendale, Oregon
- Coordinates: 44°54′54″N 123°23′07″W
- Area: 0.1 acres (0.040 ha)
- Built: 1916
- Built by: Dallas Water Co.
- MPS: Oregon Covered Bridges TR
- NRHP reference No.: 79002146

Significant dates
- Added to NRHP: November 29, 1979
- Removed from NRHP: May 18, 1987

The Pumping Station Bridge was a covered bridge spanning Rickreall Creek, near Ellendale, Oregon, in the United States. The bridge collapsed during a flood on November 24, 1986. It was listed on the National Register of Historic Places (NRHP) in 1979. The bridge was removed from the NRHP in 1987 after the collapse.

== See also ==
- List of bridges on the National Register of Historic Places in Oregon
- List of Oregon covered bridges
- National Register of Historic Places listings in Polk County, Oregon
