= Joseph G. Wilson =

American judge

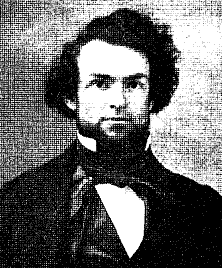

Member of the U.S. House of Representatives from Oregon's At-large district
- In office March 4, 1873 – July 2, 1873
- Preceded by: James H. Slater
- Succeeded by: James W. Nesmith

15th Justice of the Oregon Supreme Court
- In office 1862–1870
- Appointed by: A. C. Gibbs
- Preceded by: new position
- Succeeded by: Benoni Whitten

Personal details
- Born: Joseph Gardner Wilson; December 13, 1826 Acworth, New Hampshire
- Died: July 2, 1873 (aged 46) Marietta, Ohio
- Resting place: The Dalles, Oregon, at Pioneer Cemetery
- Party: Republican
- Spouse: Elizabeth M. Wilson

Joseph Gardner Wilson (December 13, 1826 – July 2, 1873) was a U.S. Republican politician in the state of Oregon. A native of New Hampshire, he served as a state circuit court judge and as a justice of the Oregon Supreme Court, and was elected to the United States House of Representatives. Wilson died shortly after assuming office in the House.

== Early life ==
Joseph Wilson was born in Acworth, New Hampshire on December 13, 1826. His family moved to Cincinnati in Hamilton County, Ohio in 1828 and then on to a farm near Reading where Joseph attended the local schools. In 1840, he left the public schools and enrolled at Cary's Academy where he studied until 1842. In 1846, he graduated from Marietta College in Marietta, Ohio. Wilson was then employed as a teacher at Farmer's College in 1849, and then studied law at Cincinnati Law School. He graduated with his law degree in 1852 and passed the bar.

== Oregon ==
In 1852, Joseph Wilson traveled the Oregon Trail and immigrated to the Oregon Territory. After arriving, he was appointed as clerk to the Oregon Supreme Court, serving until 1855. Wilson married Elizabeth Millar Wilson in 1854, and they had four children together. Also that year he began working for the Willamette Woolen Company as their first secretary. In 1860, he was selected to be the district attorney for Oregon's third judicial district (Marion County), serving until 1862.

On October 17, 1862, he was appointed by Oregon Governor A. C. Gibbs to the Oregon Supreme Court to a newly created position when a fifth seat was added to the court. At that time the justices also rode circuit as trial judges, with Wilson holding court in The Dalles. Wilson won election to a full six-year term on the court in 1864, before resigning from the court in May 1870.

== Congress and death ==
He ran for Congress in 1870, but did not win the seat. Wilson was elected as a Republican to the United States House of Representatives from Oregon in 1872 and served from March 4, 1873, until his death in Marietta, Ohio, on July 2, 1873, at the age of 46.

=== Death and burial ===
He died while moving to Washington, DC, to assume office, just before he was scheduled to give a speech at his alma mater, Marietta College. Joseph Gardner Wilson was buried in The Dalles, Oregon, at Pioneer Cemetery. His cousin James W. Nesmith filled the vacancy in the House.

== See also ==
- List of members of the United States Congress who died in office (1790–1899)

== Sources ==
U.S. House of Representatives
Preceded by James H. Slater	Member of the U.S. House of Representatives from Oregon's 1st congressional district March 4, 1873–July 2, 1873	Succeeded by James W. Nesmith
