= Benoni Whitten =

American judge

19th Justice of the Oregon Supreme Court
- In office 1870–1870
- Appointed by: George L. Woods
- Preceded by: Joseph G. Wilson
- Succeeded by: Lewis Linn McArthur

Personal details
- Born: circa 1828 Ohio
- Died: March 18, 1883 Union, Oregon

Benoni Whitten (died 1883) was an American attorney and judge in Oregon. He was the 19th justice of the Oregon Supreme Court in the United States. Though serving on the court, he never heard a trial as a justice during his four months on the bench of Oregon’s highest court, as the Supreme Court was in recess during this time.

== Early life ==
Whitten was born in the state of Ohio around 1828 to William Whitten. On March 28, 1844 Benoni married Mariah Jane Dunham in Ohio, and they would have at least one daughter named Emma. By 1866 Whitten abandoned his family in Illinois to move west in search of gold. They eventually discovered that he had moved to Eastern Oregon where he was admitted to the state bar on September 6. Whitten then practiced law in Eastern Oregon.

== Legal career ==
In May 1870, he was appointed by Oregon Governor George L. Woods to the Oregon Supreme Court to replace Joseph G. Wilson who had resigned to run for Oregon's lone spot in the United States House of Representatives (lost in 1870, won in 1872). Whitten's term then ended in September of that same year and he left the court. During that time on the court, the Supreme Court stood in recess and Whitten did not hear any Supreme Court cases but did serve as a trial level judge as the high court still practiced circuit riding at that time. While on circuit he served as the trial level judge for Darragh v. Bird, 3 Or. 229 (1870) that would go to the Oregon Supreme Court as Wood v. Fitzgerald, 3 Or. 568 (1870) in an important case concerning voting rights and Oregon's refusal to adopt the 15th Amendment to the U.S. Constitution after the American Civil War. Politically, Whitten was a Republican. Benoni Whitten died in Union, Oregon on March 18, 1883.
