= Riley–Cutler House =

Historic house in Oregon, United States

- U.S. National Register of Historic Places
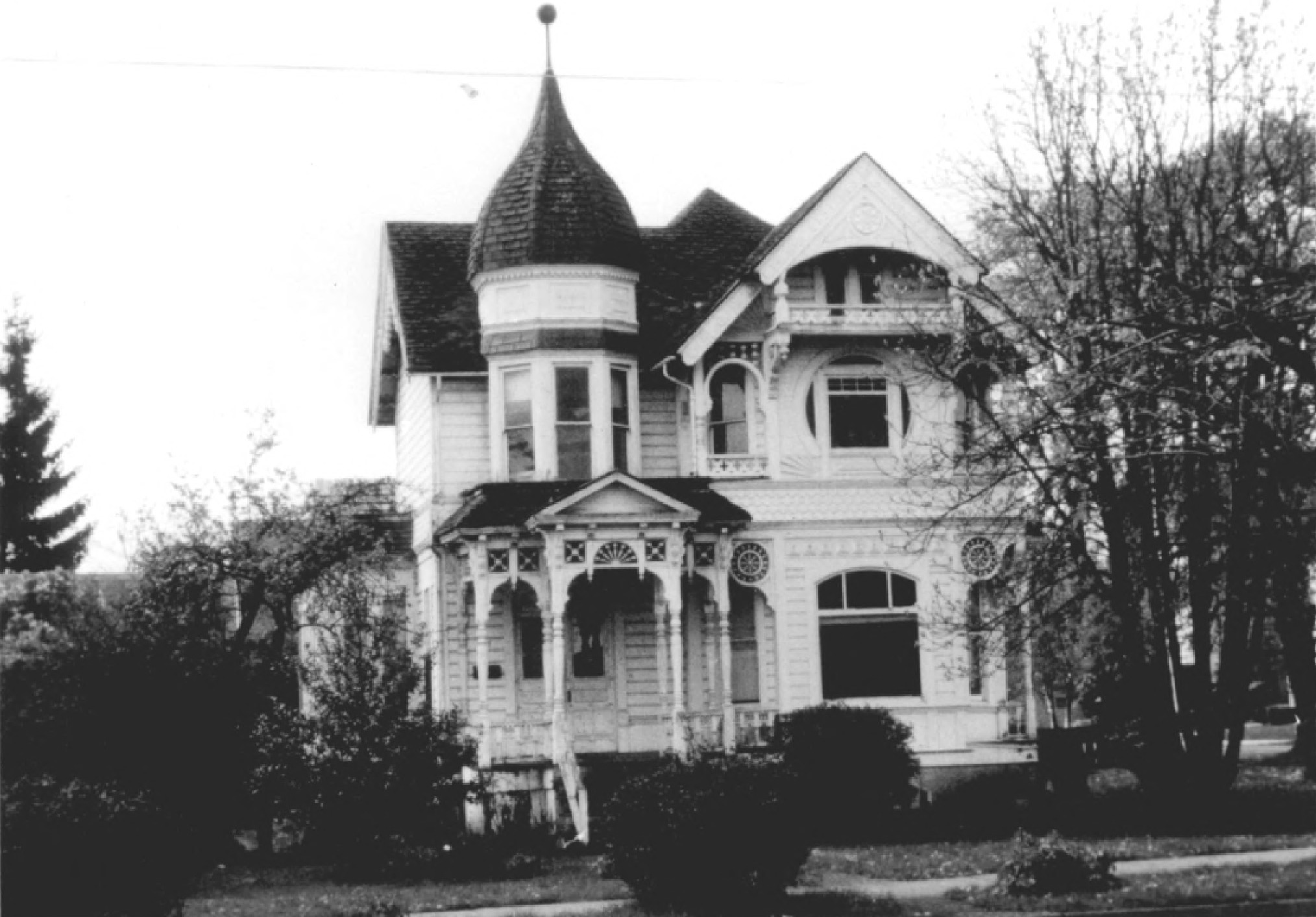
- The house in 1979

- Location within Oregon Location within the United States
- Nearest city: Pedee, Oregon
- Coordinates: 44°46′06″N 123°26′44″W
- Area: 1 acre (0.40 ha)
- Built: 1892
- Architectural style: Stick-Eastlake, Queen Anne
- NRHP reference No.: 80003380
- Added to NRHP: April 3, 1980

The Riley–Cutler House is a historic residence located in Pedee, Oregon, United States. It was built in 1892 by David Riley, the owner of the local sash and planing mill in which the house's elaborate woodwork was made. In 1979, it relocated from to Pedee from Dallas, Oregon. The house was listed on the National Register of Historic Places in 1980.

== See also ==
- National Register of Historic Places listings in Polk County, Oregon
