= Edward W. St. Pierre House =

Historic house in Oregon, United States

- U.S. National Register of Historic Places
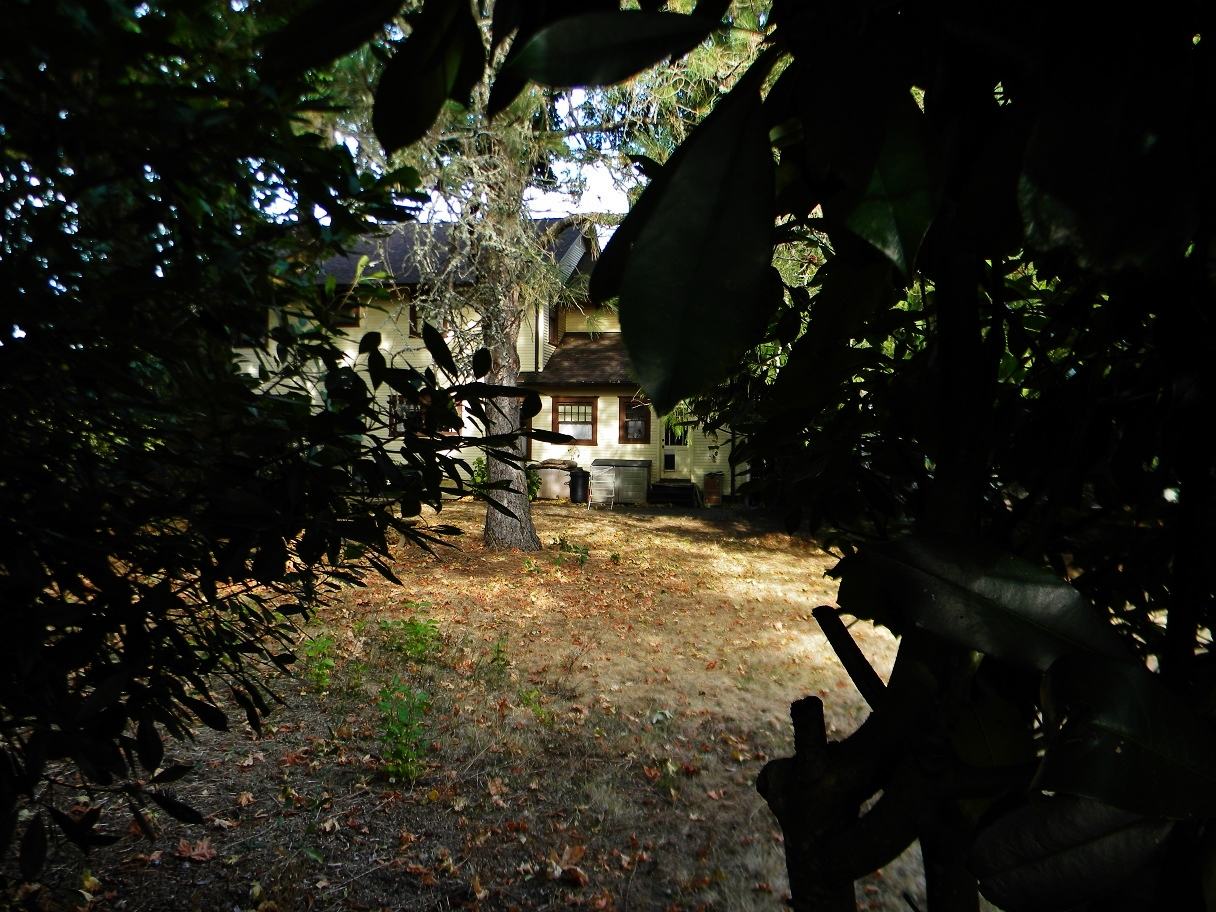

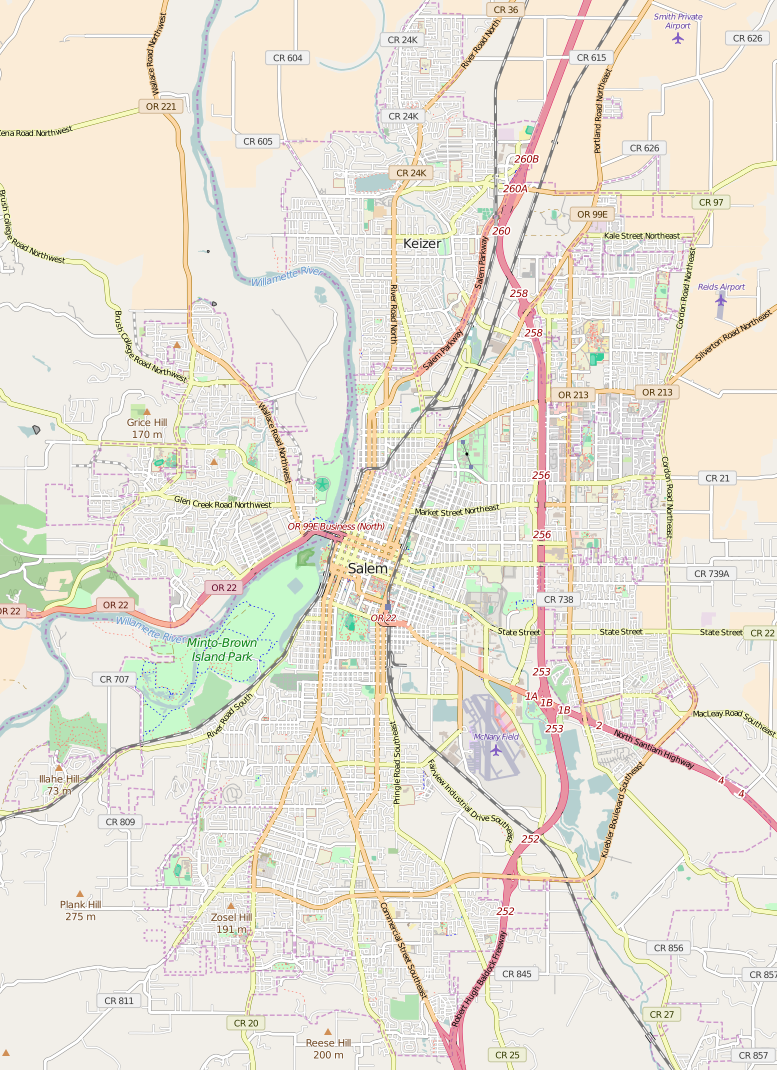
- Location within Salem OR Location within Oregon
- Location: 2425 Eola Drive; Salem, Oregon
- Coordinates: 44°56′40″N 123°04′55″W
- Built: 1911
- Architectural style: Bungalow/Craftsman
- NRHP reference No.: 89000050
- Added to NRHP: February 21, 1989

The Edward W. St. Pierre House is a historic house in the West Salem neighborhood of Salem, Oregon, United States. It is also known as Elkirk Ranch and was built in 1911. It was listed on the National Register of Historic Places in 1989.

It was deemed significant:

as that place which is most importantly associated with the leader of early prison reform in Oregon. Although E. W. St. Pierre had retired at the time the ranch was developed, he carried on his connection with the State Penitentiary which he had done so much to improve, by acting in the capacity of visiting chaplain. Edward Walter St. Pierre (1859-1917) and his wife both were natives of Illinois and were educated there. Their arrival in Portland in 1894 was preceded by extensive missionary service in Persia on behalf of the Presbyterian Church. While a clergyman at Portland's St. John's Presbyterian Church, St. Pierre helped form the Prisoner's Aid Society in 1903 to assist released convicts. His commitment to social reforms attracted the notice of the government, and he was tapped to serve inmates of the Oregon State Penitentiary as the first permanent chaplain. During the tenure of Governor Earle Chamberlain, 1903-1909, he urged enactment of a parole system as an incentive to rehabilitation, and became Oregon's first State parole officer in 1906. St. Pierre believed, in keeping with the progressive ideology of his day, that inmates should be segregated based on the degree of their offenses as a means of preventing the "hardening" of youthful offenders. He advocated rehabilitation of inmates through education and job training. He improved the prison library, started an orchestra there, and founded a prison newspaper. A chapel was constructed inside the prison compound in 1911, before ill health forced St. Pierre's retirement later in the same year. It no longer stands, having been replaced in the 1960s. Neither are either of the houses the St. Pierres occupied near downtown Salem during Governor Chamberlain's term of office extant. Thus "Elkirk Ranch" clearly is the remaining property most importantly associated with the reformer during the years he lived and ministered in the capital city and environs.

The two-story house has wood siding.

It is 35 by 50 feet (11 m × 15 m) in plan. Its interior has fir floors throughout and includes "fine Craftsman details with square, boxed pillars at the central stair landing, and built-in cupboards in the living room, dining room and study."
