= Oregon Geographic Names =

Work by Lewis A. McArthur

- Cover of 7th edition
- Author: Lewis A. McArthur and Lewis L. McArthur (editors)
- Subject: Oregon place names
- Publisher: Oregon Historical Society
- Publication date: 1928 (1st edition); 2003 (7th edition)
- Pages: 1073 pp. (7th edition)
- ISBN: 978-0-87595-278-9
- OCLC: 636774573
- Dewey Decimal: 979.5/003
- LC Class: F874.M16 2003

Oregon Geographic Names is a compilation of the origin and meaning of place names in the U.S. state of Oregon, published by the Oregon Historical Society. The book was originally published in 1928. It was compiled and edited by Lewis A. McArthur. As of 2003, the book is in its seventh edition, with revisions and additions by McArthur's son, Lewis L. McArthur (who died in 2018).

== Content ==
In its introduction, it identifies six periods in the history of the state which have contributed to the establishment of local names:

- The thousands of years of Native American life;
- The period of Spanish, British, French and early American exploration, with arrivals by sea and overland, exemplified by the activities of the Hudson's Bay Company and the Lewis and Clark Expedition;
- The pioneer period, up to and particularly including the days of the Oregon Trail;
- The period of Indian Wars and mining claims inspired by the California Gold Rush and later facilitated by the Mining Act of 1872;
- The period of homesteading between 1875 and 1925, which affected nine million acres (36,000 km²); and
- The modern period of neologisms

The seventh edition contains 6,252 entries, with references to another 2,679 names scattered throughout the text. Entries are listed in alphabetical order, beginning with A B Crossing, a railroad station in Coos County, and ending with Zwagg Island, an island near Brookings, Oregon.

== Edition history ==
The first three editions were edited by Lewis A. McArthur and published by Binford & Mort; Lewis L. McArthur took over from his father as of the fourth (1974) edition, which was the first to be published by the Oregon Historical Society Press.

The seventh edition also includes a CD-ROM with a complete biographical and geographic index as well as various maps of Oregon locations.

Lewis L. McArthur died in 2018. His daughter, Mary McArthur, reportedly took over editorship for the book's upcoming 8th edition.

According to Champ Vaughan, past president of the Oregon Geographic Names Board, no other state has a book quite like it.

== Bibliography ==
- McArthur, Lewis A.; McArthur, Lewis L. (2003). Oregon Geographic Names (Seventh ed.). Portland, Oregon: Oregon Historical Society Press. ISBN 978-0-87595-277-2.
