= Rickreall Creek =

Stream in Polk County, Oregon, United States

Coordinates: 44.928730°N 123.115098°W

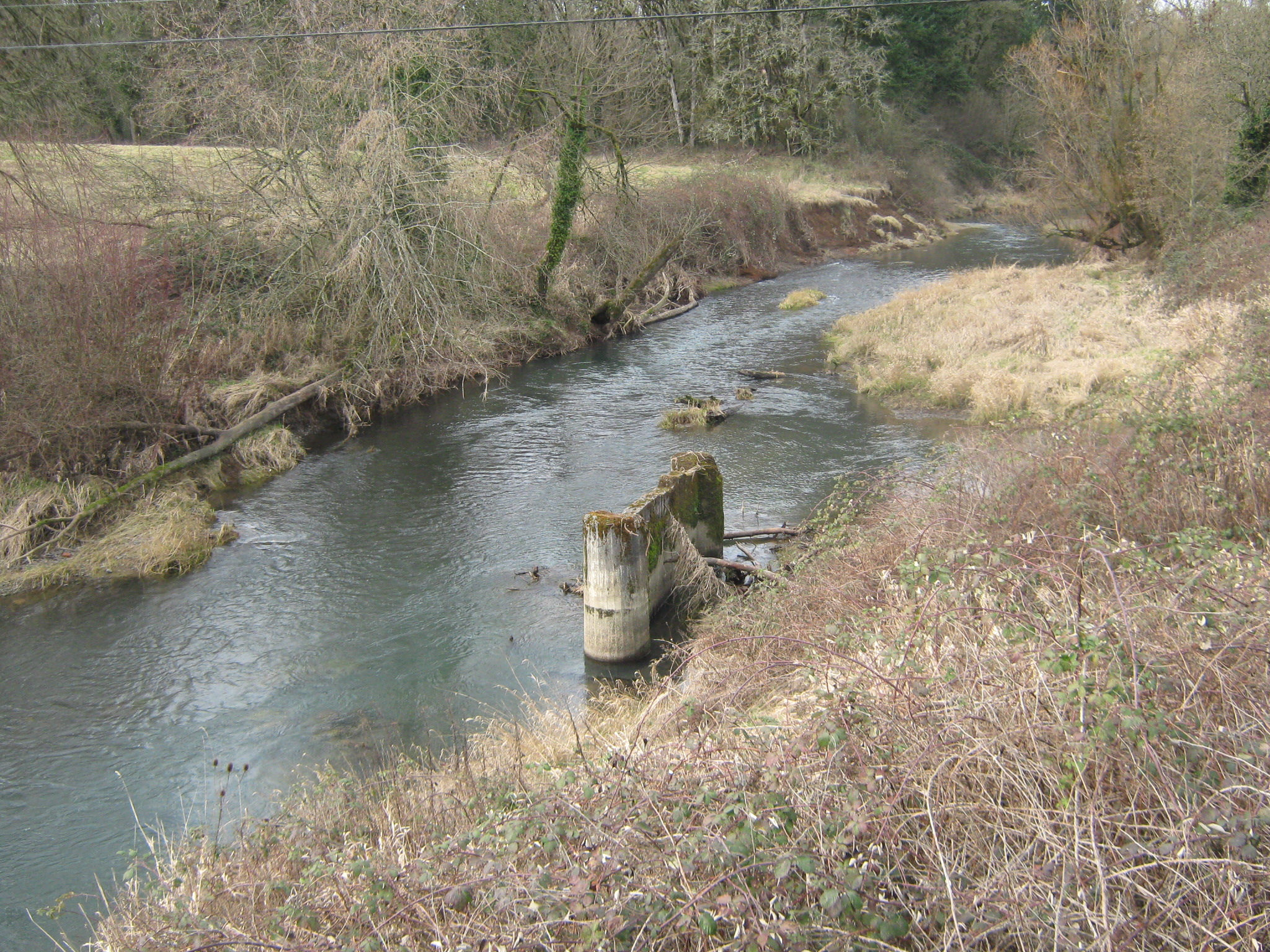
Rickreall Creek in Rickreall, Oregon at Oregon Route 99W

Rickreall Creek is a stream in Polk County, Oregon, United States rising on Laurel Mountain in the Central Oregon Coast Range and draining into the Willamette River west of Salem at Eola. The creek passes through the city of Dallas and the unincorporated community of Rickreall. The origin of the name is under some dispute, but one theory says that "Rickreall" is a corruption of "La Creole", La Creole River being another name for the stream.

== See also ==
- Ellendale, Oregon
- Multnomah (sidewheeler 1851)
- Pomona (sternwheeler)
- Pumping Station Bridge
- Washington (steamboat 1851)
