= Multnomah (1851 sidewheeler) =

Steamboat

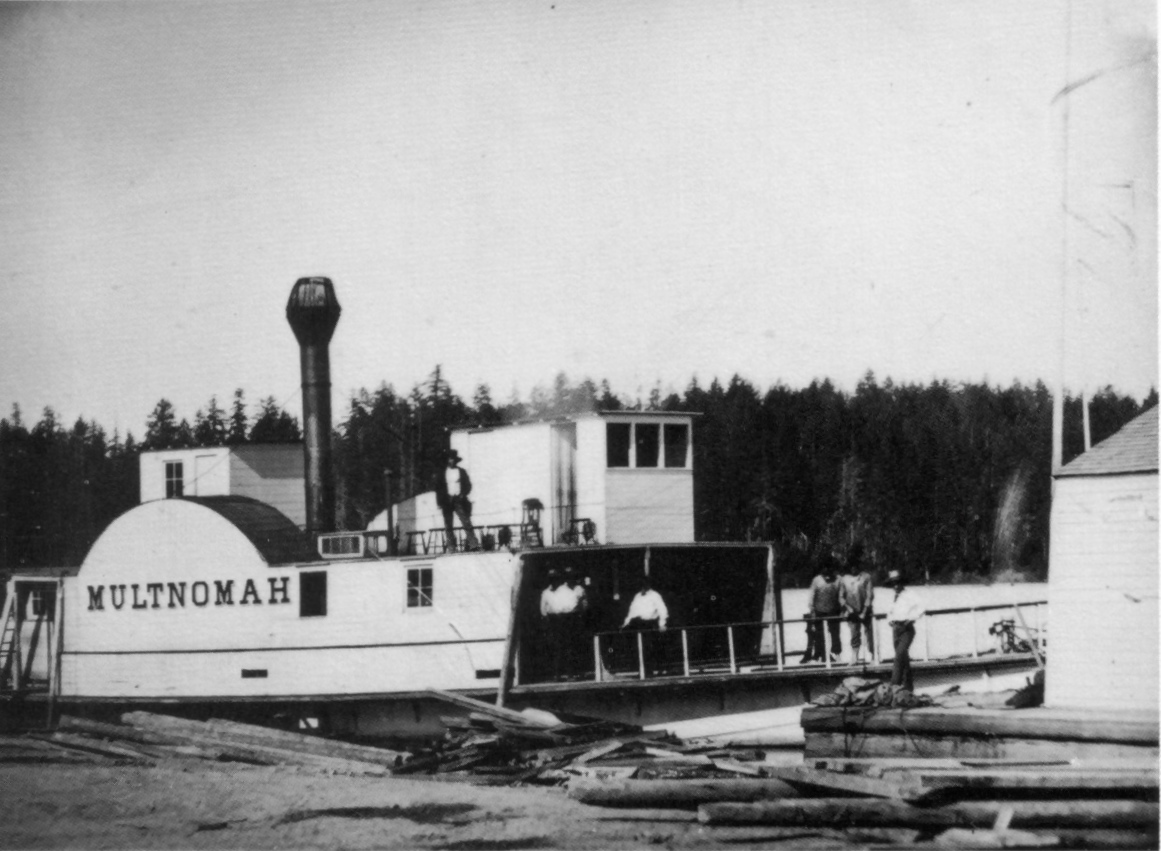
- Multnomah at foot of Washington St, Portland, Oregon, in 1853.

History
- Owner: Bissell, Maxwell, and Gray; Richard Hoyt Sr.; Oregon Steam Navigation Company
- Route: Willamette River, lower Columbia River
- Launched: June 1851 or fall,1851, at Canemah, Oregon or Oregon City.
- Out of service: 1864, dismantled at Portland, Oregon

General characteristics
- Type: inland shallow draft steamboat, wooden hull
- Length: 108 ft (32.9 m)
- Beam: Measured over hull: 17 ft (5.2 m) or 18 ft (5.5 m); Measured over guards: 28 ft (8.5 m)
- Draft: 18 in (46 cm)
- Depth: 6 ft (1.8 m) depth of hold
- Installed power: steam, twin high-pressure engines, 10 in (25 cm) bore by 48 in (120 cm) stroke, horizontally mounted, 6.6 nominal horsepower
- Propulsion: sidewheels
- Speed: 14 mi (23 km) per hour

The Multnomah was one of the first steamboats to operate on the Willamette and Yamhill rivers. This vessel should not be confused with the Multnomah, a steamboat built in Portland, Oregon in 1885, which was larger and of a much different design.

== Design and construction ==
The components of Multnomah were manufactured in the eastern United States, then shipped to Oregon City, Oregon around Cape Horn on the bark Success. At that time, there were no locks at Willamette Falls, so it was important to determine whether a boat would be built above or below the falls. In the case of Multnomah, the vessel was assembled at Canemah, a settlement above the falls. This allowed the vessel to run on the upper Willamette, running south from Canemah through the Willamette Valley. Multnomah's hull was barrel-shaped, and held in shape with iron hoops which made caulking unnecessary. The Multnomah was a sidewheeler, as were all the boats operating in Oregon before 1854. The vessel's funnel was equipped with a spark arrester.

== Operations ==
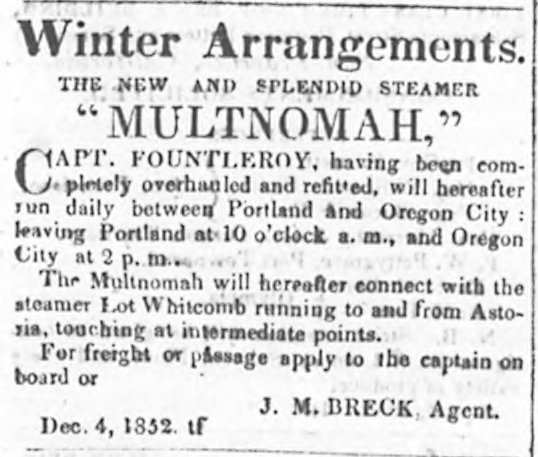
Advertisement for Multnomah on run from Portland to Oregon City, published December 2, 1852.

Multnomah's engines were first tested in June 1851, and in August 1851 the vessel was taken on the first run upriver. On this trip, Multnomah reached Cressman's Bar, a point about 20 miles (32 km) downriver from Salem, Oregon. At Cressman's, the water was so shallow that even Multnomah, which needed only 18 inches to run in, could only cross the bar with difficulty. Multnomah was able to proceed 5 miles (8.0 km) further upstream to Matheny's landing, (now the site of the Wheatland Ferry where the water was so shallow that no passage was possible. Under political pressure, the territorial legislature authorized funds to excavate the bars, so that by September, 1851, a channel four feet deep extended all the way to Salem. Multnomah was able to work further upriver from Salem, reaching the mouth of Rickreall Creek, according to Mills. Historian Corning states that Multnomah went even further that fall, and became the first steamboat to reach Corvallis, then known as Marysville.

Canemah, where Multnomah had been built, was the upriver terminus of a portage road that ran around Willamette Falls. Multnomah ran regularly from Canemah south to Salem, with side trips up the Yamhill River to Dayton. Running downriver, Multnomah often carried 1000 to 1500 bushels of wheat grown in the Willamette Valley.

== Popular reception ==
There comes the Multnomah! Success to the steamer,
Sweet sounding her music, high floating her streamer:
The sound of her paddles the hills serenading,
And her smoke high aloft into vapor is fading.
There comes the Multnomah shout fifty glad voices;
Each heart beats with rapture, each bosom rejoices,
Her structure so firm, yet buoyant and airy
She skims o'er the waves like a sylph or a fairy.
There comes the Multnomah, we greet her with pleasure,
The choicest of welcomes to her is extended,
Because with her welfare our interests are blended.

— Anonymous poet signed "O.P.Q.", published in pioneer newspaper Oregon Spectator, August 19, 1851.

Residents of the Oregon Territory saw the coming of the steamboats as a mark of progress. Poems were published in honor of the early steamboats. Randall V. Mills, an historian of the early steamboats in Oregon, and a folklore expert, found these poems to be lacking in skill, but expressive of the attitudes of the population.

== Transfer to lower river ==
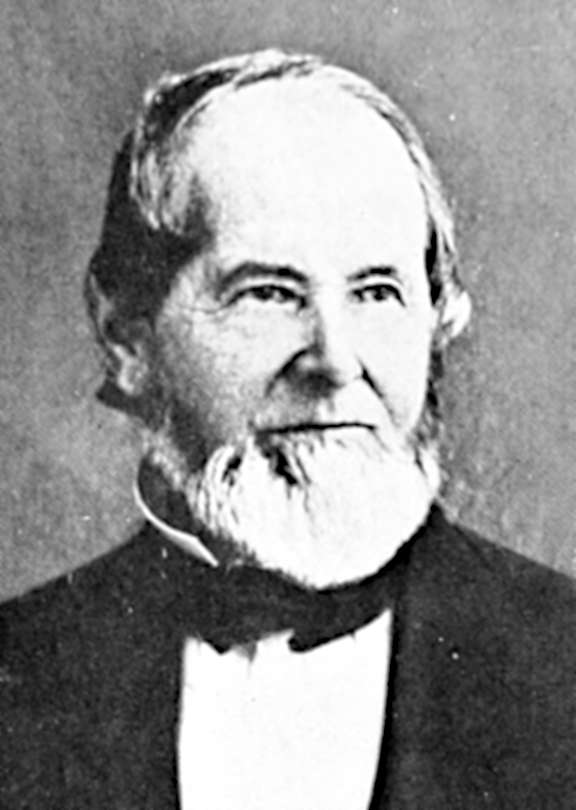
George Abernethy, pioneer businessman and politician, was an agent for Multnomah.

Multnomah needed deeper water to operate in than was generally available on the upper Willamette, so in May 1852, the vessel was lined over Willamette Falls to the lower river. ("Lining" was a process of hooking of a cable to the vessel and a point on the shore, and hauling on the cable using the vessel's capstan to move the vessel up through rapids. With care, the same technique could be used to take the vessel over rapids and short falls.) After this, Multnomah was worked on the routes running from Portland, including Portland to Oregon City. In the early 1850s, for the steamboats in general on the Oregon City-Portland run, rates were $5 per passenger and $15 per ton of freight. (A ton was unit of volume, not of weight, generally equal to 100 cubic feet.)

In the fall of 1852, Multnomah ran on the route from Portland up the Columbia River to the Cascades of the Columbia, under the command of Captain Fauntleroy. In 1853, Multnomah was returned to the Portland-Oregon City route under Capt Richard Hoyt Sr. In late 1852, Multnomah, advertised as the "new and splendid steamer", made connections in Portland with the Lot Whitcomb, with Multnomah carrying traffic between Portland and Oregon City, and Lot Whitcomb running between Portland and Astoria. Multnomah was advertised as embarking Oregon City passengers bound for the Whitcomb at 3:00 p.m. on Mondays and 7:30 a.m. on Wednesdays. George Abernethy was Multnomah's agent in Oregon City. Fares could be paid to Abernathy at his store or to the captain on board Multnomah.

Competition was fierce among the steamboats on the lower Willamette in the early 1850s. To keep rates up, George S. Hoyt, owner of Multnomah and Alexander S. Murray, owner of the sidewheeler Portland formed the first steamboat combination on the river. In 1854 Richard Hoyt Sr. bought Multnomah and put the vessel on the Portland-Astoria run, where he had the mail contract. During Hoyt's ownership, Multnomah was used mainly on the lower Columbia, that is, the stretch of the river running from Astoria to the Cascades, and also up the Willamette Portland. In 1859, Hoyt chartered the vessel to Captain Molthorp, who ran it briefly again on the Portland-Oregon City route. Hoyt remained the owner of Multnomah until he died in 1862. After Hoyt died, Multnomah was sold to the Oregon Steam Navigation Company.

Multnomah was considered the fastest vessel on the river in the early 1850s, and once was able to travel the 18 miles (29 km) from Portland to Vancouver, WT in one hour 20 minutes, then considered a speedy trip.

== Captains ==
Captains of Multnomah included John H. Couch, Richard Hoyt Sr., Henry L. Hoyt, John McNulty, William E Molthrop, and Fauntleroy. Pursers included M.B. Miller, J.M. Gillman, J.M. Breck Richard Hoyt Jr. and others.

== Disposition ==
Multnomah was dismantled in 1864 at Portland.
