= Beulah Methodist Episcopal Church =

Historic church in Oregon, United States

- U.S. National Register of Historic Places
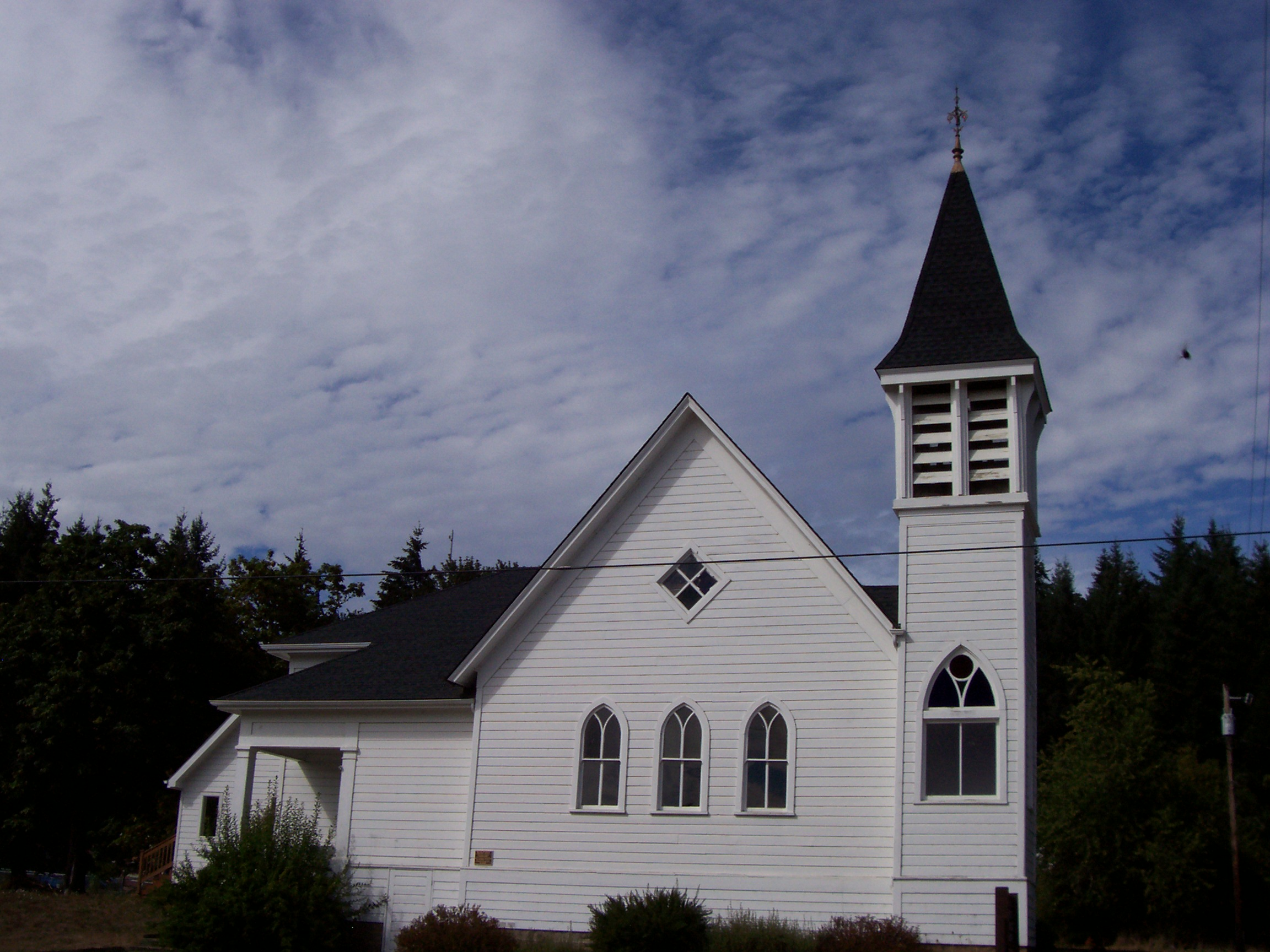

- Location within Oregon Location within the United States
- Location: 242 North Main, Falls City, Oregon
- Coordinates: 44°51′58.3″N 123°25′54.1″W
- Area: 0.3 acres (0.12 ha)
- Built: 1892
- Architectural style: Gothic Revival
- NRHP reference No.: 02001638
- Added to NRHP: December 31, 2002

Beulah Methodist Episcopal Church is a historic church at 242 North Main in Falls City, Oregon.

It was built in 1892 and added to the National Register in 2002.
