= Zwagg Island =

Uninhabited island in Oregon, US

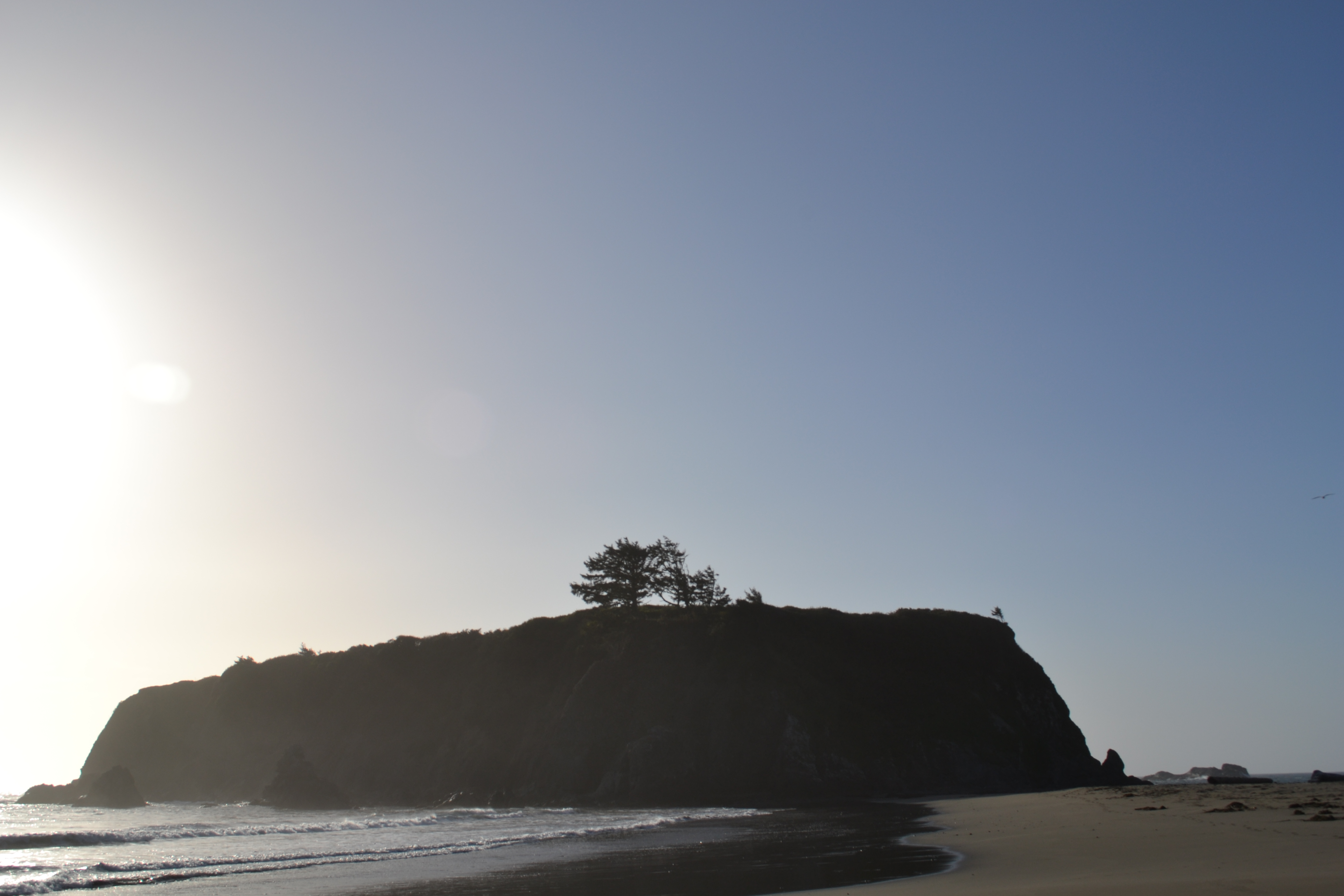

- Location within Oregon

Geography
- Location: Curry County, Oregon
- Coordinates: 42.048082°N 124.295368°W
- Highest elevation: 28 m (92 ft)

Administration
- United States

Zwagg Island, also known as Grand Island, is a non-populated island near Brookings in Curry County, Oregon, United States. The island is approximately 5 acres (2.0 ha) in size and about 1/2 mile (0.80 km) southwest of the intersection of Mill Beach Road and highway 101.

A 1988 report by the United States Geological Survey found no resources on the island.

Zwagg Island was named after Folker Von Der Zwaag, an 1889 Oregon pioneer born in the Netherlands. Von Der Zwaag lived a hermit life on the island with his dog, Sniff.
