= James Nesmith =

American politician and lawyer (1820–1885)

James W. Nesmith
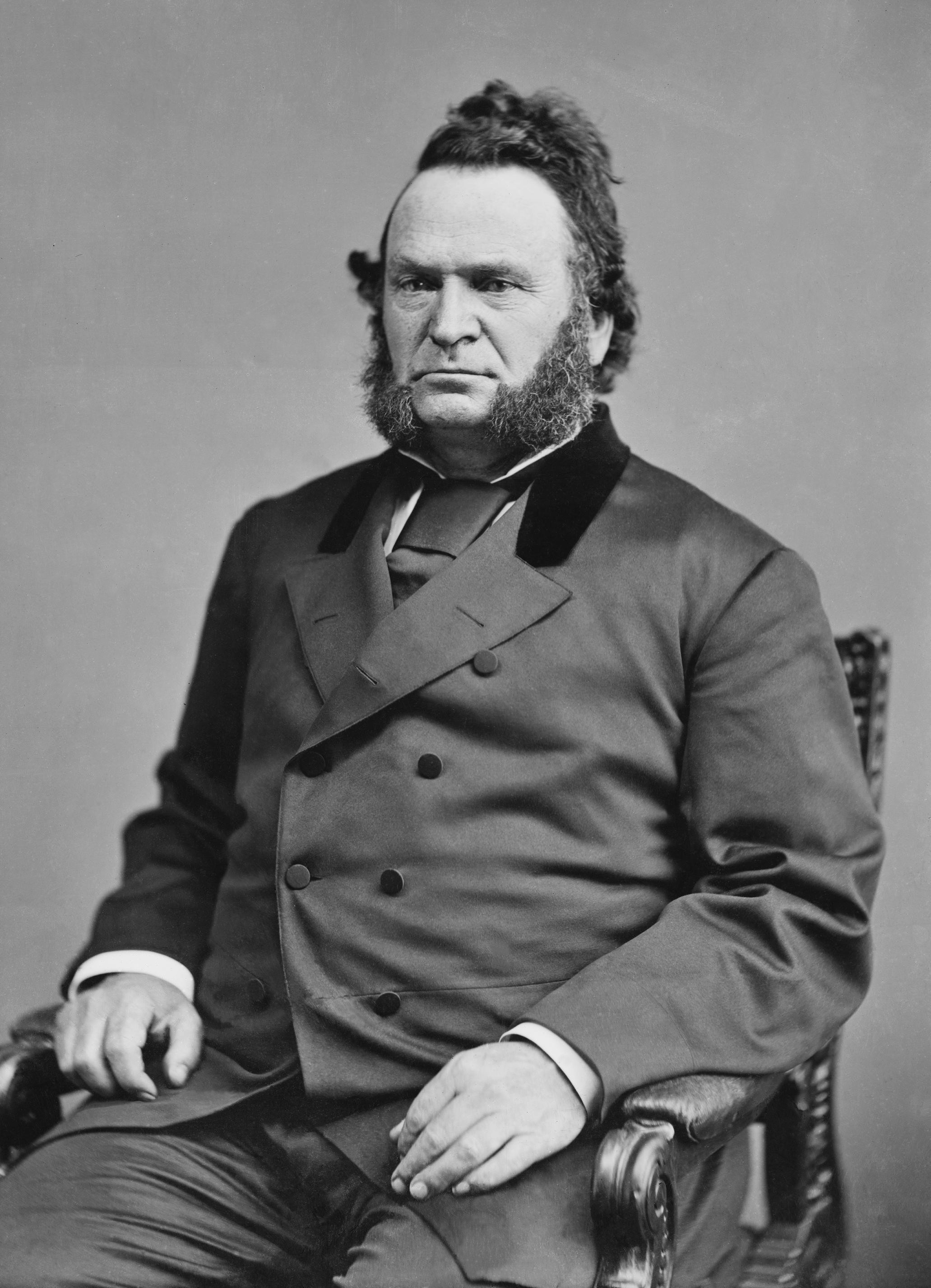

United States Senator from Oregon
- In office March 4, 1861 – March 3, 1867
- Preceded by: Joseph Lane
- Succeeded by: Henry W. Corbett

Member of the U.S. House of Representatives from Oregon's At-large district
- In office December 1, 1873 – March 3, 1875
- Preceded by: Joseph G. Wilson
- Succeeded by: George Augustus La Dow

4th Supreme Judge of the Provisional Government of Oregon
- In office December 25, 1844 – August 9, 1845
- Preceded by: Ira Babcock
- Succeeded by: Peter Hardeman Burnett

Personal details
- Born: James Willis Nesmith; July 23, 1820 New Brunswick, British Canada
- Died: June 17, 1885 (aged 64) Rickreall, Oregon
- Resting place: south bank of Rickreall Creek
- Party: Democratic
- Profession: Lawyer

James Willis Nesmith (July 23, 1820 – June 17, 1885) was an American politician and lawyer from Oregon. Born in New Brunswick to American parents, he grew up in New Hampshire and Maine. A Democrat, he moved to Oregon Country in 1843 where he entered politics as a judge, a legislator in the Provisional Government of Oregon, a United States Marshal, and after statehood a United States senator and Representative.

Nesmith's grandson, Clifton N. McArthur, and son-in-law, Levi Ankeny, both later served in Congress.

== Early years ==
James Nesmith was born in what is now the Canadian province of New Brunswick (which was a British colony at the time) while his parents were on a visit from their home in Washington County, Maine, on July 23, 1820. Of Scottish and Irish heritage, his father was William Morrison Nesmith and his mother the former Harriet Miller. About 1828, James and his father moved to Claremont, New Hampshire, where he received a limited education. In 1838, Nesmith moved to Ohio, followed by Iowa in 1842 where he waited to immigrate to Oregon Country. Nesmith planned on traveling the Oregon Trail with Elijah White in 1842, but was late to arrive and instead left the next spring with Marcus Whitman after working as a carpenter in the interim at Fort Scott in Kansas.

== Oregon ==
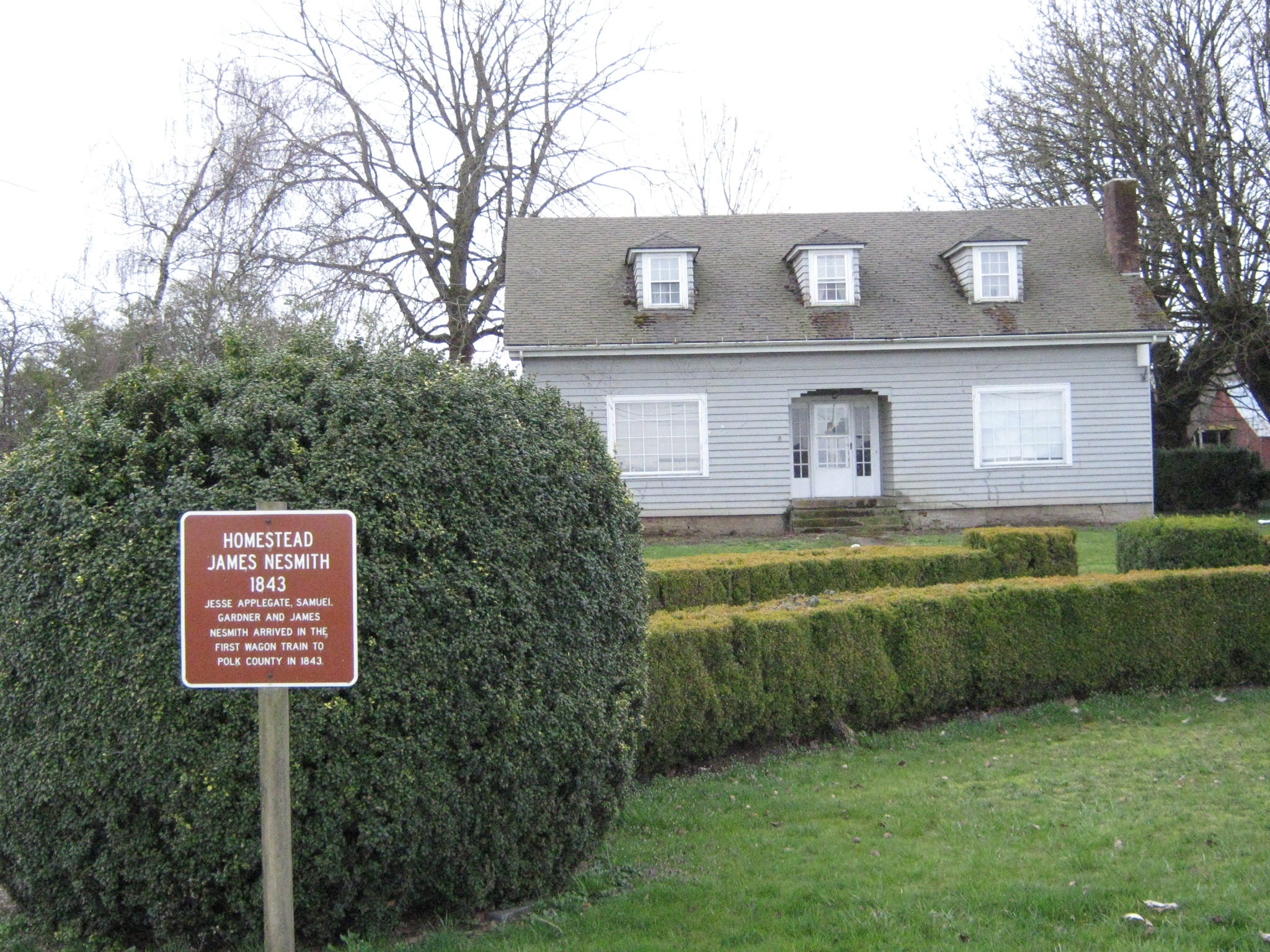
The James Nesmith House near Rickreall

In 1843, Nesmith arrived in Oregon where he studied law and was admitted to the bar before being selected to serve as Supreme Judge of the Provisional Government of Oregon in 1845. He finished his term in 1846 and moved to Polk County where he took a land claim, began farming, and married Pauline Goff on June 21, with whom he would have seven children. In 1847, he was elected to the Provisional Legislature of Oregon from Polk County, and served briefly in the 1848 session before resigning.

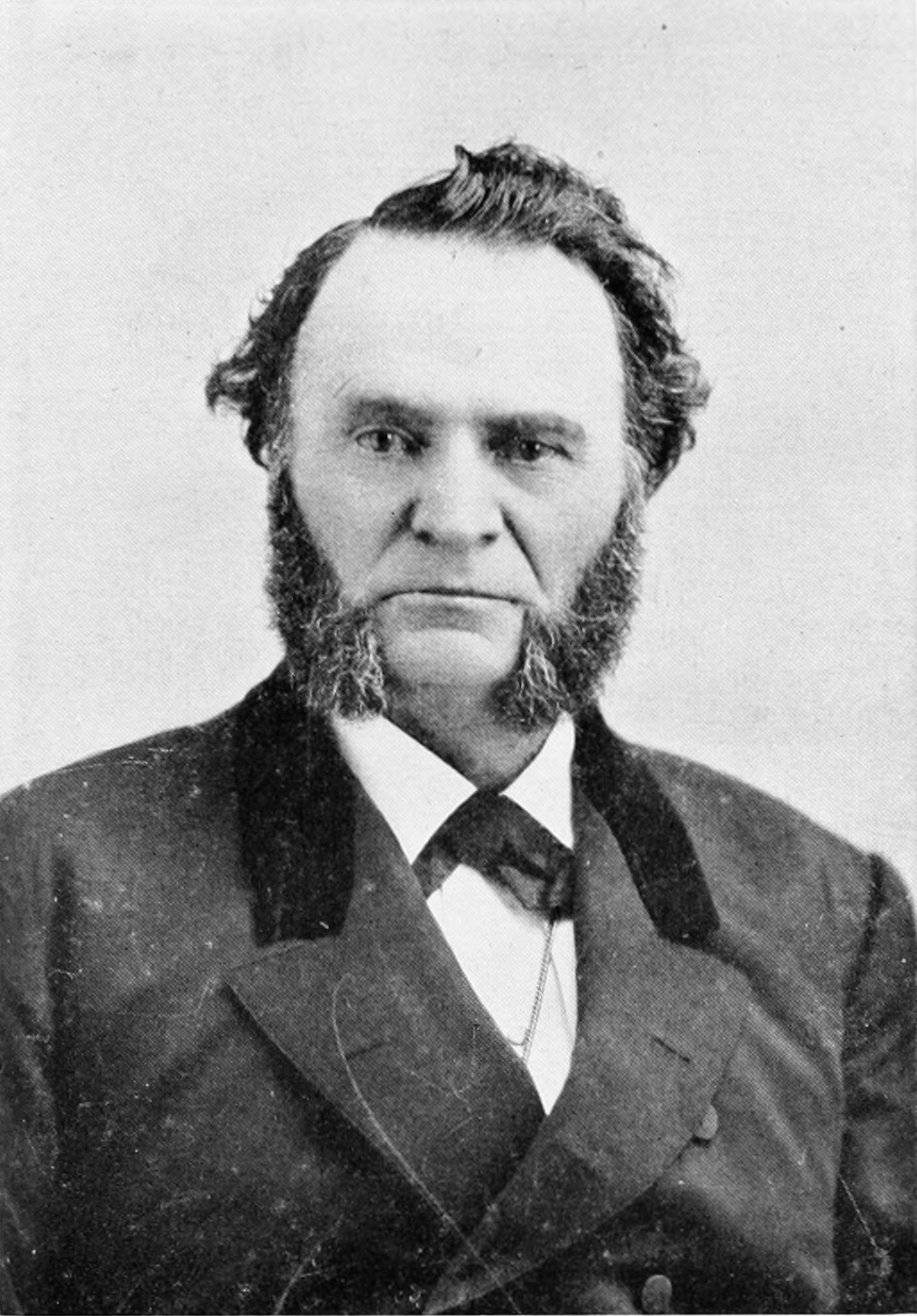
James W. Nesmith

Nesmith next served as a captain during the Cayuse War against Native Americans in Eastern Oregon from 1847 to 1848. When news of the California Gold Rush reached the Willamette Valley in 1848, he traveled south to the gold fields, remaining until 1849. In 1849, he returned to Polk County where he purchased a flour mill on Rickreall Creek near the county seat of Dallas. There Nesmith engaged in agricultural pursuits in the community that was for a time named after him, as well as stock raising.

He again was a captain in the militia forces during the Rogue River War in 1853 and the Yakima Indian War in 1855. Between the two wars he was the United States Marshal for the Oregon Territory, replacing Joseph Meek. From 1857 to 1859 he was the Superintendent of Indian Affairs for Oregon and Washington Territories.

As Superintendent of Indian Affairs, Nesmith was aggressive against American Indians on Oregon's south coast, and once stated to Commissioner of Indian Affairs George Manypenny that the extermination of the Chetco people "would occasion no regrets at this office."

== Congress ==
On February 14, 1859, Oregon entered the Union as the 33rd state. In 1860, the Oregon Legislative Assembly elected Nesmith to the United States Senate. A Democrat, he served from March 4, 1861, to March 3, 1867, and was an unsuccessful candidate for re-election. While in the Senate, he and fellow Oregon Senator Benjamin F Harding were the only Democrats in that chamber to vote for the Thirteenth Amendment to the United States Constitution to abolish slavery. After serving in the Senate, he was appointed Minister to Austria, but his nomination was not confirmed.

After returning to Rickreall, he served as road supervisor of Polk County in 1868. Nesmith was elected to the Forty-third Congress to fill the vacancy caused by the death of his cousin, Joseph G. Wilson, and served from December 1, 1873, to March 3, 1875. He did not seek re-nomination in 1874 to the Forty-fourth Congress and returned to farming in Polk County.

== Later years and family ==
In addition to his cousin Joseph Wilson, Nesmith's grandson, Clifton Nesmith McArthur, was also a United States Representative from Oregon. Levi Ankeny, Senator for Washington, was his son-in-law.

== Death and burial ==
James Willis Nesmith died in Rickreall, Oregon, on June 17, 1885, at the age of 64 and was interred in Polk County on the south bank of Rickreall Creek.

U.S. Senate
Preceded by Joseph Lane	U.S. senator (Class 3) from Oregon; 1861–1867; Served alongside: Edward D. Baker, Benjamin Stark, Benjamin F. Harding, George H. Williams	Succeeded by Henry W. Corbett
U.S. House of Representatives
Preceded by Joseph Gardner Wilson	Member of the U.S. House of Representatives from Oregon's 1st congressional district 1873–1875	Succeeded by George Augustus La Dow
