= Ellendale, Oregon =

Coordinates: 44.93°N 123.355°W

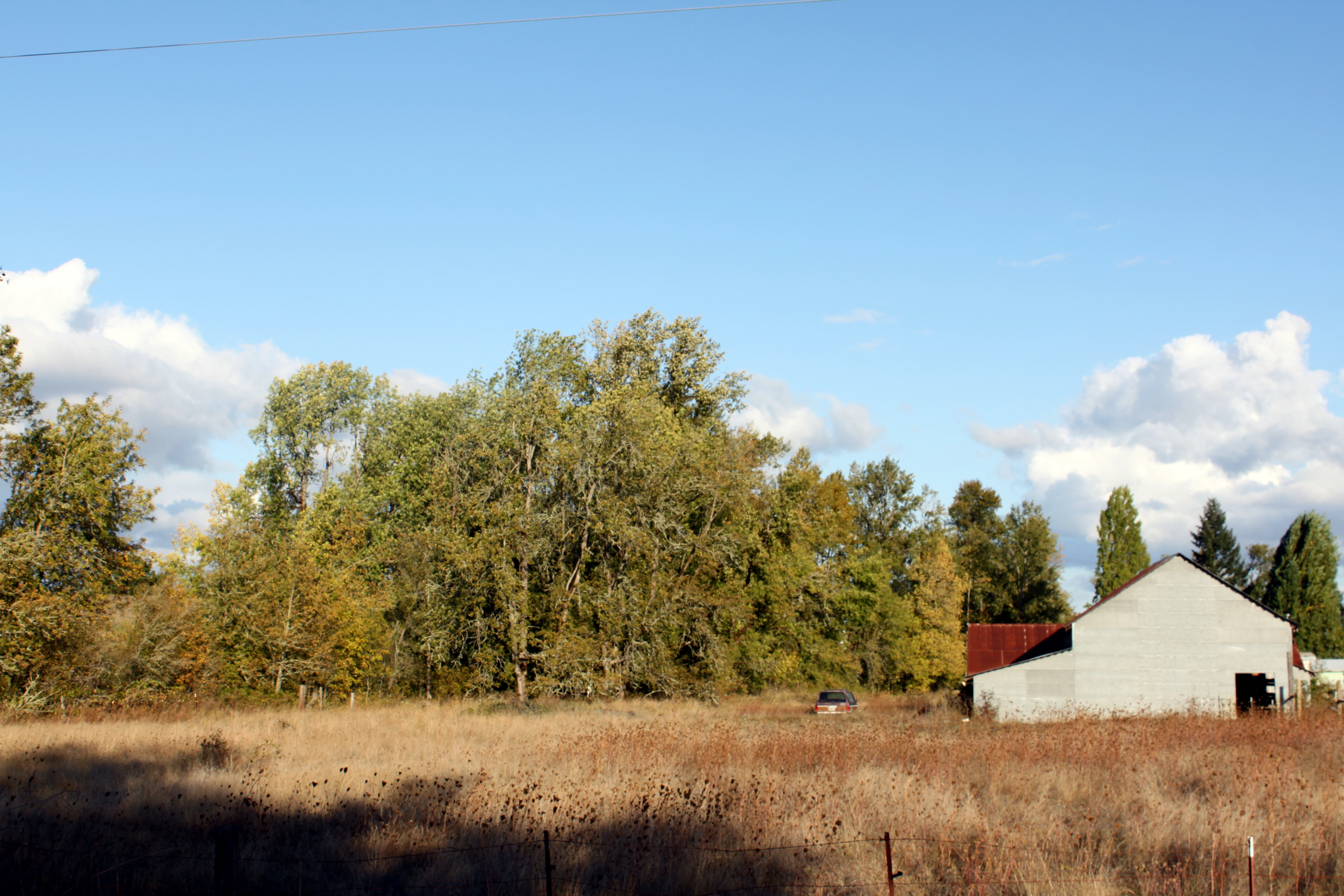
Field and barn in Ellendale

Ellendale is a ghost town in Polk County, Oregon, United States, about two and a half miles west of Dallas. It was the first settlement in present-day Polk County by non-Kalapuyans. The community's name changed over the years, with the first post office in Polk County being opened in this locality as "O'Neils Mills" in 1850. The post office was renamed "Nesmiths" (Or "Nesmiths Mills") in 1850 and discontinued in 1852. The community was eventually renamed Ellendale.

== History ==
James A. O'Neil built the county's first gristmill at the confluence of La Creole Creek (now Rickreall Creek) and O'Neils Creek over the winter of 1844–1845. The site was chosen for its proximity to water power for the mill, timber and a rock quarry that could provide millstones. A community formed around the mill as it was one of only two gristmills on the west side of the Willamette River at the time and it served settlers from as far away as northern Yamhill County and south as far as Linn and Benton counties. O'Neil offered lodging and a store for people who had made the long trip to his mill. Miners on their way to the California Gold Rush would also stop at the community for flour for the journey.

In 1849, a flood destroyed the mill and O'Neil sold his interest to James W. Nesmith and Henry Owen, who rebuilt it as "Nesmith's Mill". In 1856 the mill was sold again to Hudson & Company but in November 1857 it was closed because more mills had been built in the area and it was no longer needed. In 1863, the mill site, water power and land were sold to judge Reuben P. Boise, whose donation land claim adjoined the property. La Creole Creek was renamed "Ellen's Dale" after Boise's wife, and soon both the creek and the community were renamed "Ellendale".

In 1860, one of Oregon's earliest woolen mills was started in Ellendale by Boise and several others, who had bought and converted a sawmill that had been built upstream from the gristmill in 1854. The sawmill had the only planer in that part of Oregon, most boards still being hand-dressed at the time. In 1870 Boise's mill burned down.

The Pumping Station Bridge in the Ellendale area was added to the National Register of Historic Places in 1979, however, it collapsed in 1987 and was removed from the list.

== See also ==
- List of ghost towns in Oregon
