= Rickreall, Oregon =

Unincorporated community in the state of Oregon, United States

- Census-designated place (CDP)
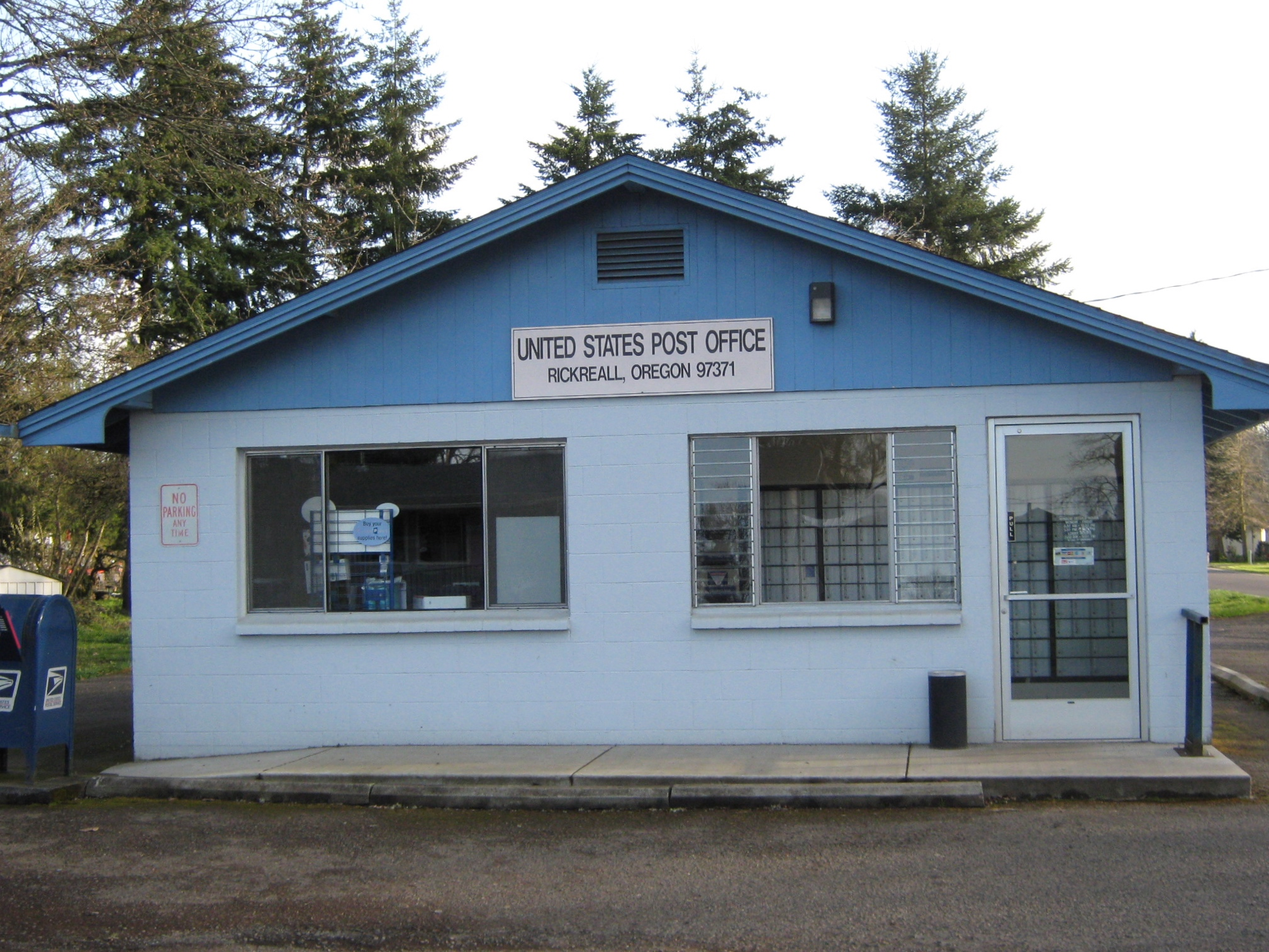
- Rickreall Post Office

- Location of Rickreall, Oregon
- Coordinates: 44°55′55″N 123°14′04″W
- Country: United States
- State: Oregon
- County: Polk

Area
  - Total: 0.17 sq mi (0.44 km^{2})
  - Land: 0.17 sq mi (0.44 km^{2})
  - Water: 0 sq mi (0.00 km^{2})
- Elevation: 213 ft (65 m)

Population (2020)
  - Total: 76
  - Density: 444.1/sq mi (171.45/km^{2})
- Time zone: UTC-8 (Pacific (PST))
  - Summer (DST): UTC-7 (PDT)
- ZIP code: 97371
- Area code: 503
- FIPS code: 41-61800
- GNIS feature ID: 2409167

Rickreall (/ˈrɪkriɔːl/ RIK-ree-awl) is an unincorporated community in Polk County, Oregon, United States. For statistical purposes, the United States Census Bureau has defined Rickreall as a census-designated place (CDP). The census definition of the area may not precisely correspond to local understanding of the area with the same name. The population of the CDP was 76 at the 2020 census. Rickreall is part of the Salem Metropolitan Statistical Area. Rickreall Creek runs along the community's southern edge.

== History ==
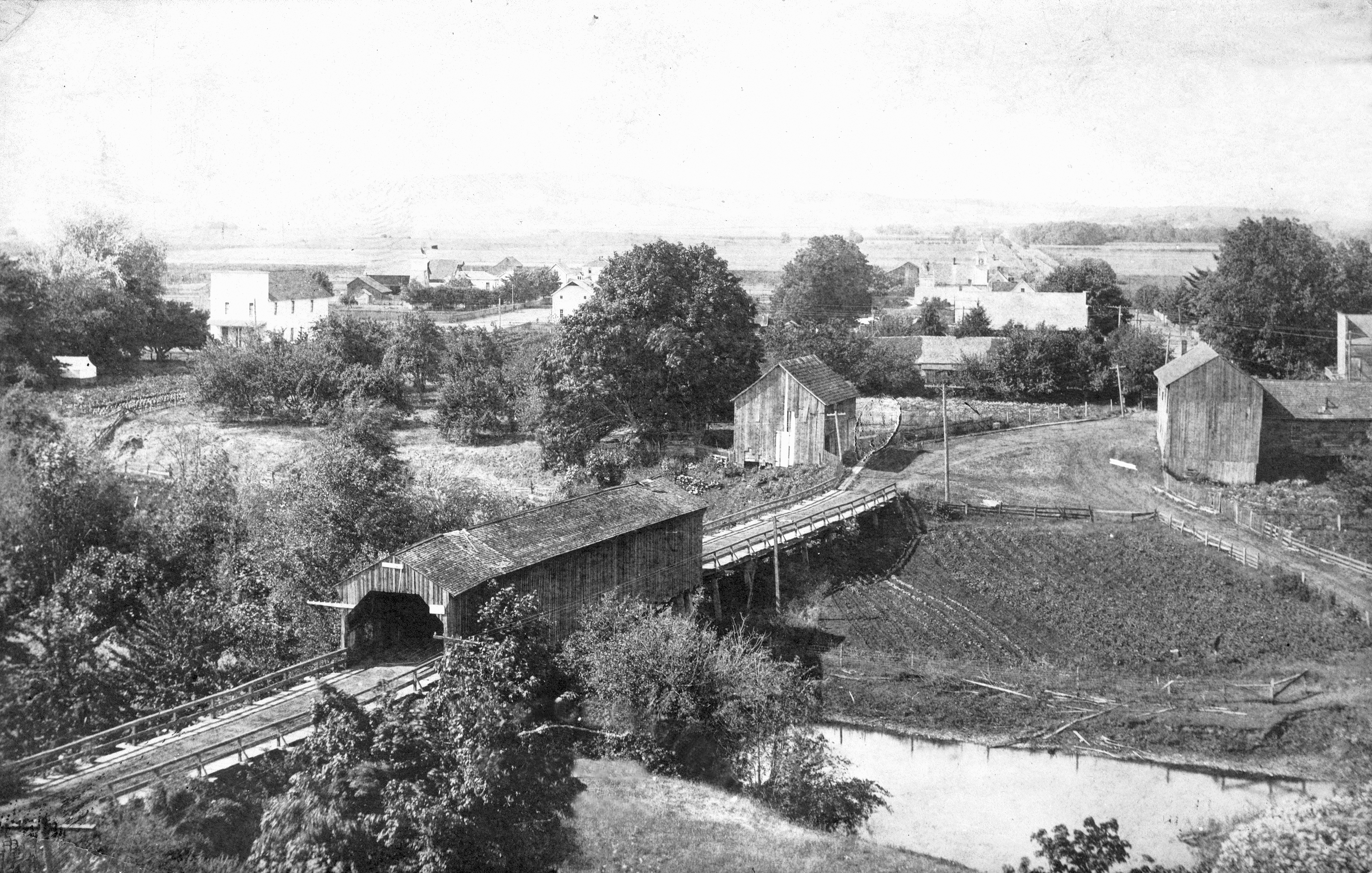
An early view of Rickreall

"Rickreal" post office was established in 1851 with Nathaniel Ford as postmaster. It was discontinued in 1857, but reestablished in 1866 with the spelling "Rickreall". Ford was again postmaster. The office has continued to operate to the present day. Rickreall was often referred to as Dixie during the Civil War and for some time after, because of the Southern sympathies of the local populace. Dixie was never the official name of the community or the post office.

== Geography ==
According to the United States Census Bureau, the CDP has a total area of 0.2 square miles (0.52 km^{2}), all of it land.

== Demographics ==
Historical population
Census	Pop.	Note	%±
2020	76		—
U.S. Decennial Census

As of the census of 2000, there were 57 people, 26 households, and 17 families residing in the CDP. The population density was 335.6 inhabitants per square mile (129.6/km^{2}). There were 26 housing units at an average density of 153.1 per square mile (59.1/km^{2}). The racial makeup of the CDP was 98.25% White, and 1.75% from two or more races.

There were 26 households, out of which 19.2% had children under the age of 18 living with them, 57.7% were married couples living together, 7.7% had a female householder with no husband present, and 30.8% were non-families. 23.1% of all households were made up of individuals, and 11.5% had someone living alone who was 65 years of age or older. The average household size was 2.19 and the average family size was 2.56.

In the CDP, the population was spread out, with 15.8% under the age of 18, 1.8% from 18 to 24, 24.6% from 25 to 44, 38.6% from 45 to 64, and 19.3% who were 65 years of age or older. The median age was 50 years. For every 100 females, there were 83.9 males. For every 100 females age 18 and over, there were 71.4 males.

The median income for a household in the CDP was $27,222, and the median income for a family was $26,389. Males had a median income of $41,250 versus $21,250 for females. The per capita income for the CDP was $12,846. None of the population and none of the families were below the poverty line.

== Education ==
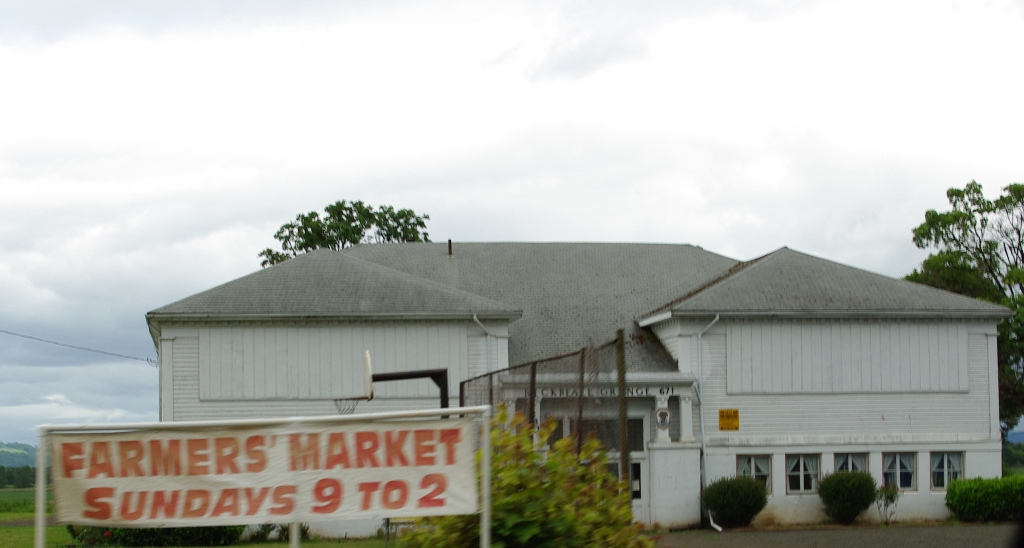
Rickreall Grange

The Jefferson Institute, located a mile west of the Nathaniel Ford house, was founded in 1846; it closed sometime in the 1850s.

Later there were two elementary schools in the Rickreall School District. One was Oak Grove Elementary, east of the community, and the other was Rickreall Elementary. In 2003, Rickreall Elementary was shut down by the Dallas School District, and the school building was leased to Our Jubilee Church and Academy. Students who were attending Rickreall Elementary were sent to Whitworth Elementary in Dallas. As of 2007, the church ended their lease on the Rickreall Elementary building. Oak Grove Elementary closed in the fall of 2005.

== Utilities ==
Water service for the Rickreall area is provided by Rickreall Community Water Association, a non-profit water association serving approximately 525 homes, 64 businesses, and 2 schools in the greater Rickreall area.
