= Tourist sternwheelers of Oregon =

List of sternwheelers of Oregon used in tourism

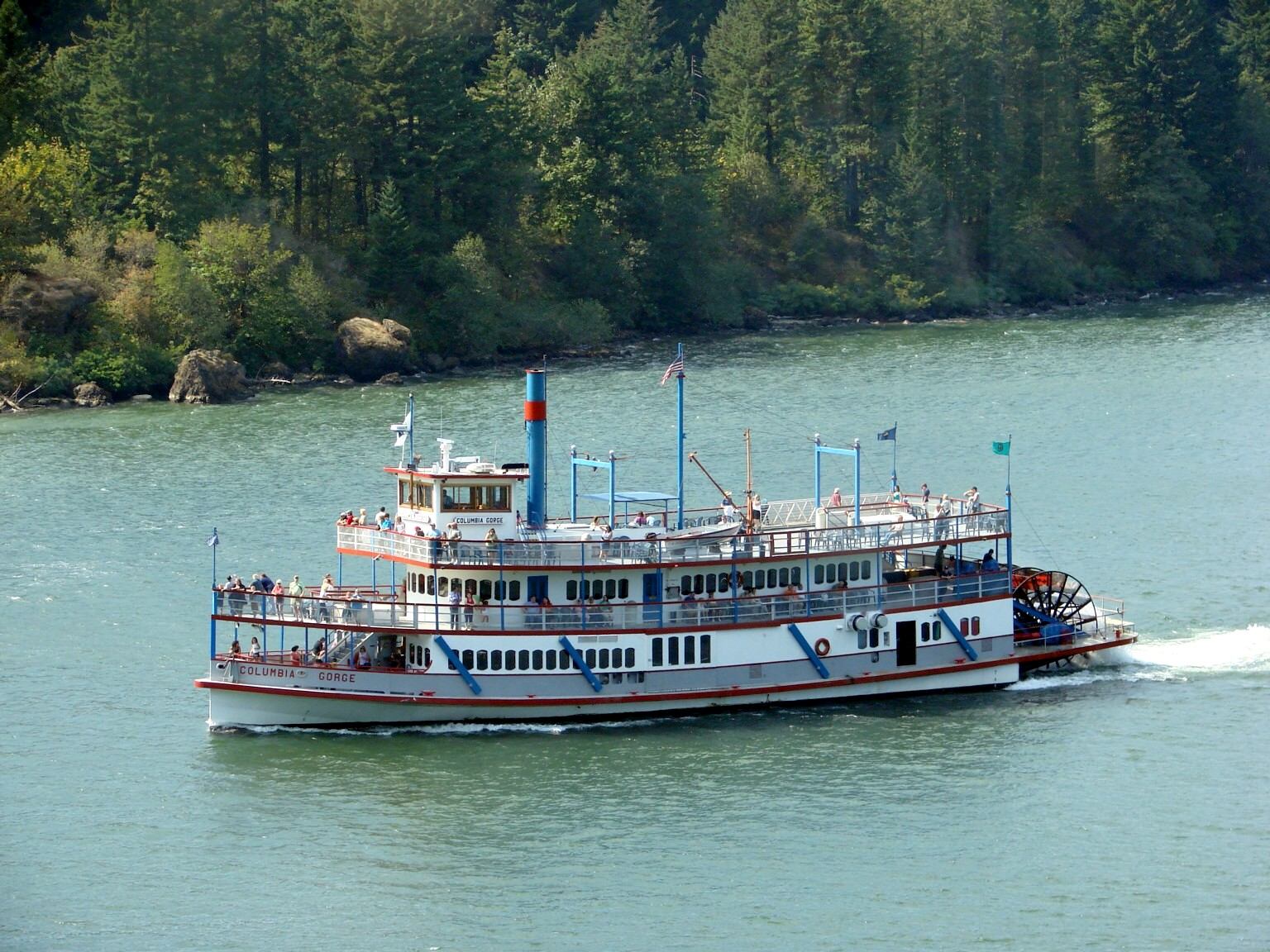
The sternwheeler M.V. Columbia Gorge, built in 1983, was one of the first replica steamboats built for tourism purposes in Oregon.

Since the early 1980s, several non-steam-powered sternwheel riverboats have been built and operated on major waterways in the U.S. state of Oregon, primarily the Willamette and Columbia Rivers, as river cruise ships used for tourism. Although configured as sternwheelers, they are not paddle steamers, but rather are motor vessels that are only replicas of paddle steamers. They are powered instead by diesel engines. The Lurdine (now Rose) was, when launched in 1983, "the first passenger-carrying sternwheeler in decades to [operate] on the Columbia River". In the case of the 1983-built M.V. Columbia Gorge, the construction and operation of a tourist sternwheeler was led by local government officials who viewed the idea as potentially being a major tourist attraction, giving an economic boost to their area, Cascade Locks, Oregon.

== Background ==
The only operational sternwheel steamboat surviving in Oregon is the Portland, moored at Portland, Oregon, and listed on the National Register of Historic Places. However, the Portland is a tugboat and has never carried passengers on a regular basis. In the late 19th century and first part of the 20th century, a large number of passenger steamboats – both sternwheelers and sidewheelers – were operated on the rivers of Oregon and Washington, with many examples on the Willamette and also many on the Columbia River. However, with no such vessels surviving and operational in the late 20th century, interest in building and operating replicas began to develop, now geared towards attracting tourists with excursion travel, or river cruises.

Proposals to construct and operate a new sternwheeler on the Columbia became a serious proposition at least as early as 1974, when the commissioners of the Port of Cascade Locks began pursuing a plan to construct and operate a 150-foot (46 m), 350-passenger sternwheeler on the river. However, not until 1983 did any plans for new sternwheel tour boats come to fruition, when two such boats – the Lurdine (now Rose) and Columbia Gorge – were launched. In the same year, the Port of Portland considered renovating the 1947-built sternwheel steam tug Portland for use as a tour boat. That proposal was eventually dropped, because of the high cost of work required to satisfy applicable U.S. Coast Guard regulations. The historic tug was renovated and returned to operating condition, but not converted into a passenger ship.

== Individual vessels ==
The boats and ships described below are listed in order of their completion, or launching. All operate, or have operated, in Oregon, but most have also operated in Washington (on the Columbia River, which divides those two states for much of its length) or in Alaska.

=== Rose ===
The sternwheeler now named Rose is a 65-foot (20 m) boat that was built over a nearly four-year period from 1979 to 1983. Constructed in Astoria, Oregon, by John Hendrickson, she was launched on April 24, 1983, and was originally named Lurdine. Her name was intended to honor two late 1800s sternwheelers, the Lurline and the Undine. Lurdine was used for tour boat service based in Astoria, and when she entered service, on July 3, 1983, The Oregonian reported that she was "the first passenger-carrying sternwheeler in decades to [operate] on the Columbia River". She was designed to emulate historic sternwheelers and has a 10-foot-diameter paddle wheel, which is diesel-powered.

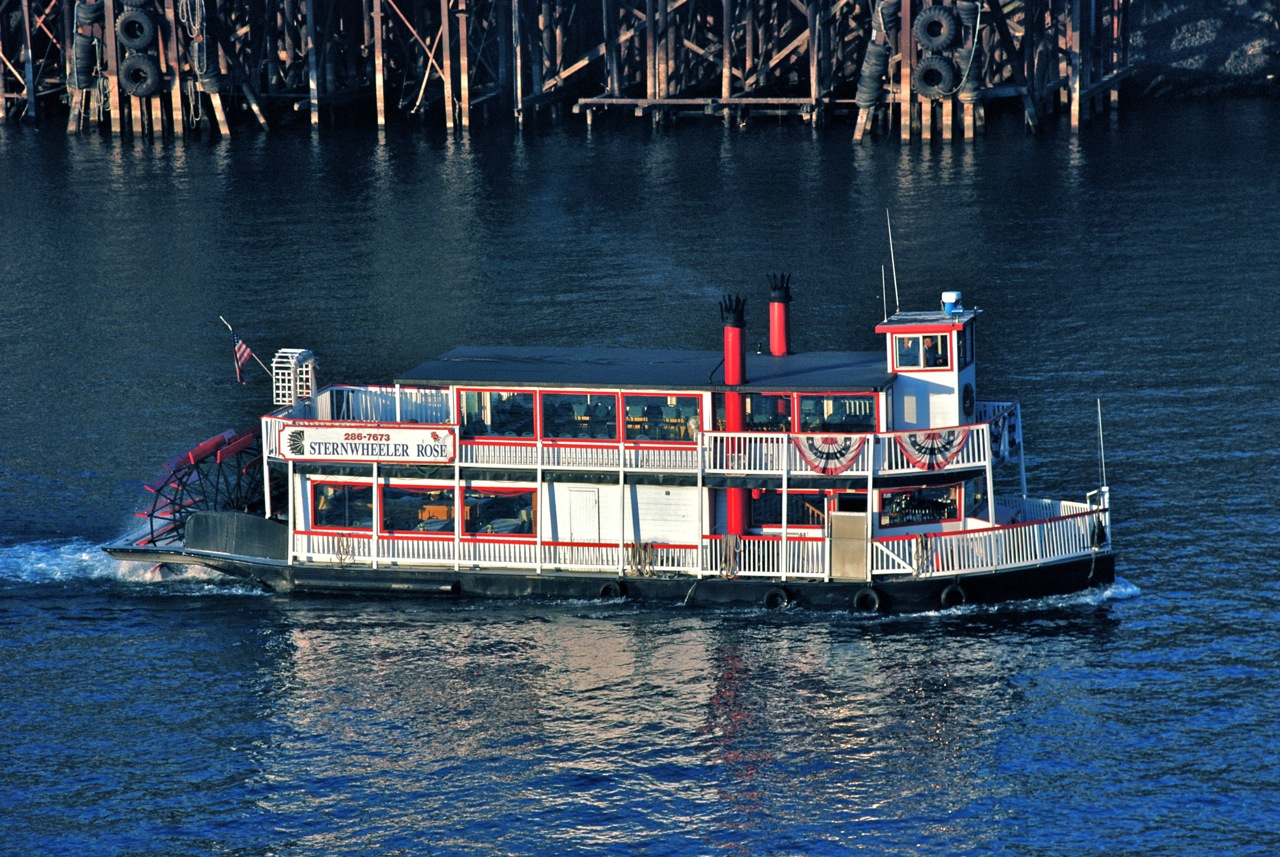
The Rose in Portland in 2009

In 1985, Lurdine was purchased by a group of investors in Portland who formed a new company named the Oregon Steam Navigation Company – a revival of the name used by the original Oregon Steam Navigation Company – which in June 1985 began operating river cruises on the Willamette River, from Portland, and on the Columbia River, also from Portland. Lurdine was moved to Portland, renamed Rose, and began operating Portland-based Columbia River cruises in June or July 1985. In the fall of the same year, she operated on the Willamette River, including excursions through the Willamette Falls Locks at Oregon City, and was moored at Portland's RiverPlace marina. In subsequent years, Rose has usually been operated only on the Willamette. She has a capacity of 49 passengers.

Rose was sold to Willamette Sternwheel Navigation in early 2004 and continued to be based in Portland and operated on the Willamette. Her mooring location was moved from Portland to Oregon City in 2010.

=== Columbia Gorge ===
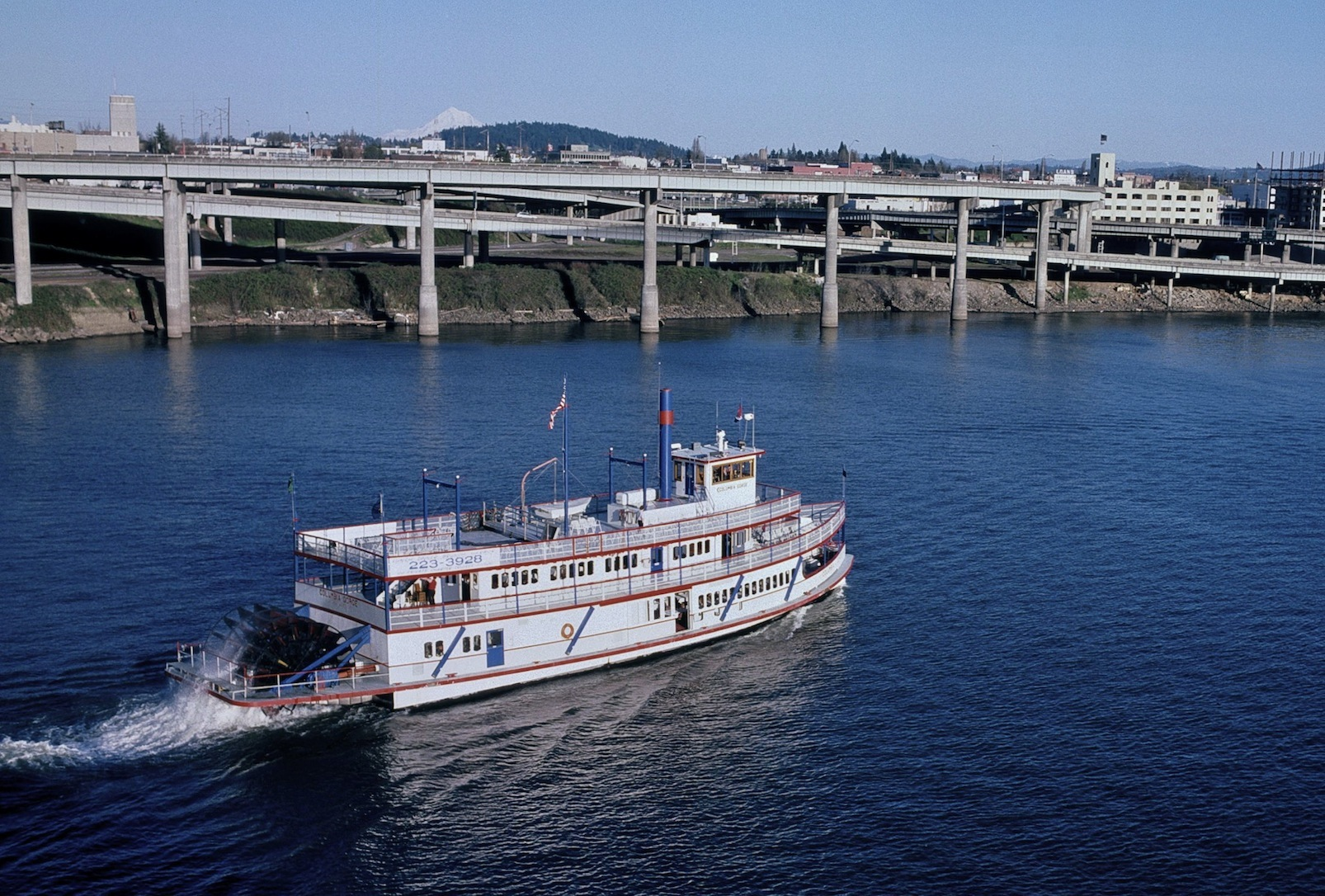
The Columbia Gorge on the Willamette River, in Portland, in 1987

The M.V. Columbia Gorge is a 145-foot (44 m) sternwheeler in service on both the Columbia and Willamette Rivers. She was built in Hood River by Nichols Boat Works and was launched on August 30, 1983. The motors driving her 17-foot (5.2 m) paddle wheel are diesel-powered. She was partially modeled on the 1890-built Bailey Gatzert and is named for the Columbia River Gorge. She was built for the Port of Cascade Locks, at a cost of around $2.5 million, of which $1.1 million was funded by federal grants secured by U.S. Senators Mark Hatfield and Bob Packwood, with a goal of boosting tourism in the area. After some delay in obtaining certification from the U.S. Coast Guard, Columbia Gorge took her maiden passenger voyage on October 29, 1983. The Port's plans were for the boat to operate on the Columbia River, out of Cascade Locks, during summer months and on the Willamette River, out of Portland during winter months. Her design includes simulated hog chains, described in 1983 by The Oregonian as "upright posts on the top deck [which were] used on vintage boats to keep the hulls from vibrating and the wooden boats from warping", but which on this vessel are for appearance only. She is certified to carry up to 599 passengers. In the late 1980s, at least, M.V. Columbia Gorge followed the same seasonal pattern of operating out of Cascade Locks from mid-June through September and spending the remainder of each year in Portland, cruising on the Willamette, where she was joined by the Rose.

On the morning of January 13, 2024, high winds caused the Columbia Gorge to break free of her moorings in Cascade Locks, resulting in damage to surrounding structures and the vessel herself. Crews regained control of the vessel and piloted her downriver in winds up to 65 mph to the Bonneville Dam for safe mooring and assessment.

=== Willamette Queen ===
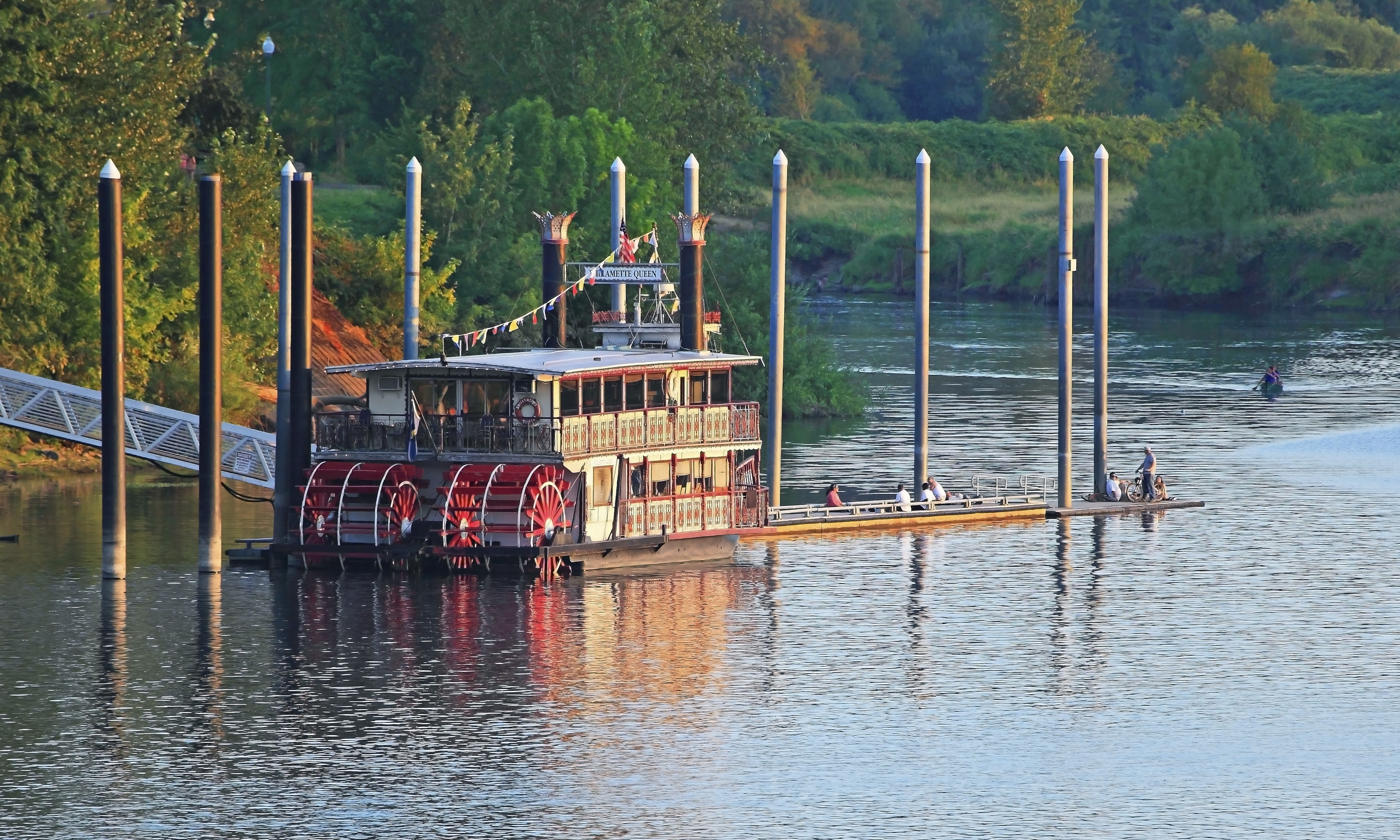
The Willamette Queen, pictured at her dock in Salem, Oregon, has twin paddle wheels.

The Willamette Queen is an 87-foot (27 m) sternwheeler built in 1990 in Newport, Oregon, which operates on the Willamette River, year-round from Salem's Riverfront Park. Although based in Salem, she makes a trip to Portland once every five years for a required periodic hull inspection. She is a scaled-down replica of former Mississippi River and Yukon riverboats, with twin paddle wheels and a capacity of 90 passengers. The Willamette Queen carries 10,000–15,000 passengers a year. In March 2015, the boat was lifted out of the water to undergo repair work, expected to last until at least May.

=== Queen of the West ===
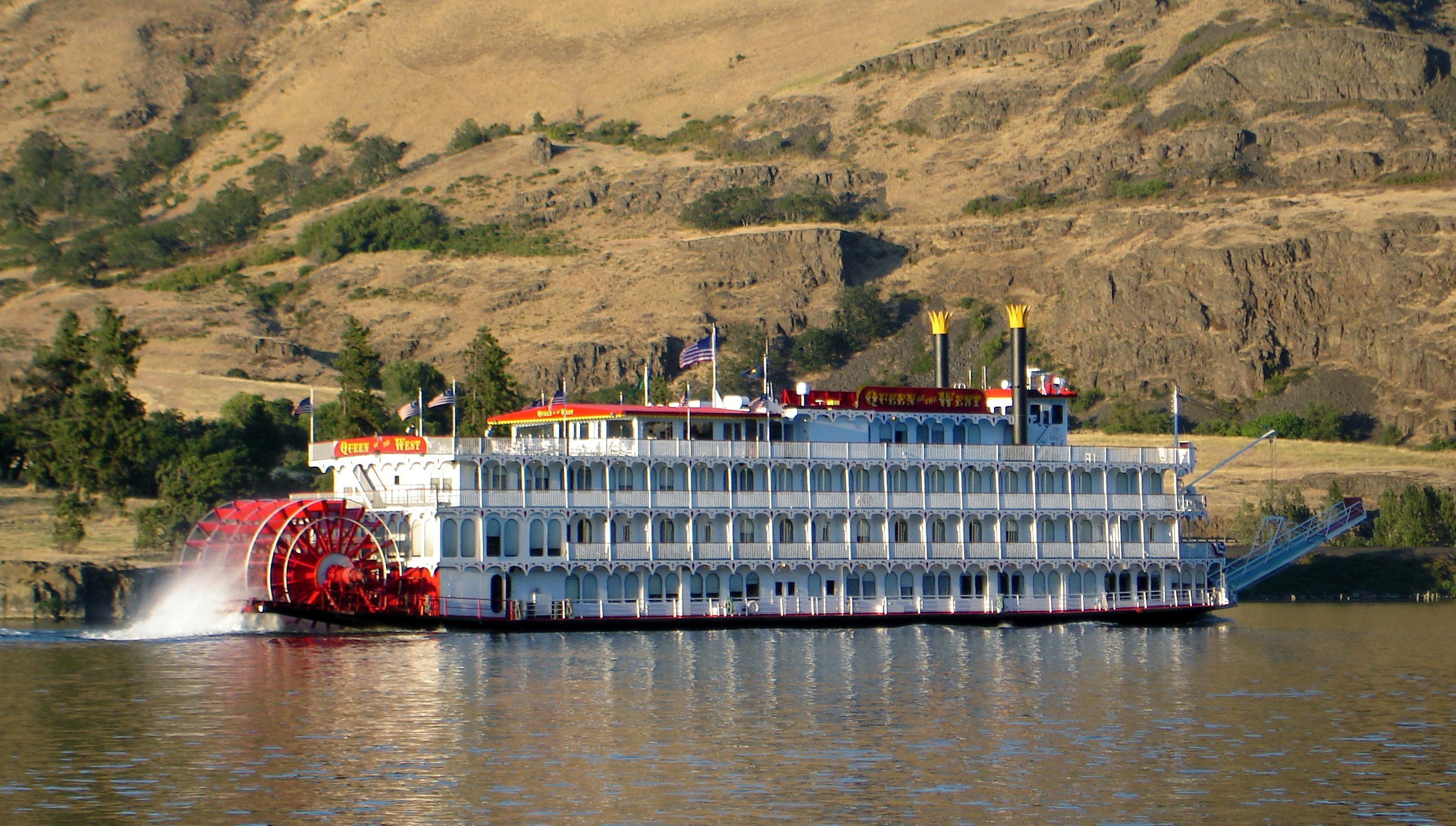
The Queen of the West paddling in the Columbia near Hood River

The 230-foot (70 m) Queen of the West was built in 1995 and operates cruises on the Columbia River, out of Portland, and the Snake River, out of Clarkston, Washington. She was built for the American West Steamboat Company, but was later sold to the Majestic America Line and, in turn, to American Cruise Lines in 2009. She was renovated in 2011.

=== American Empress ===
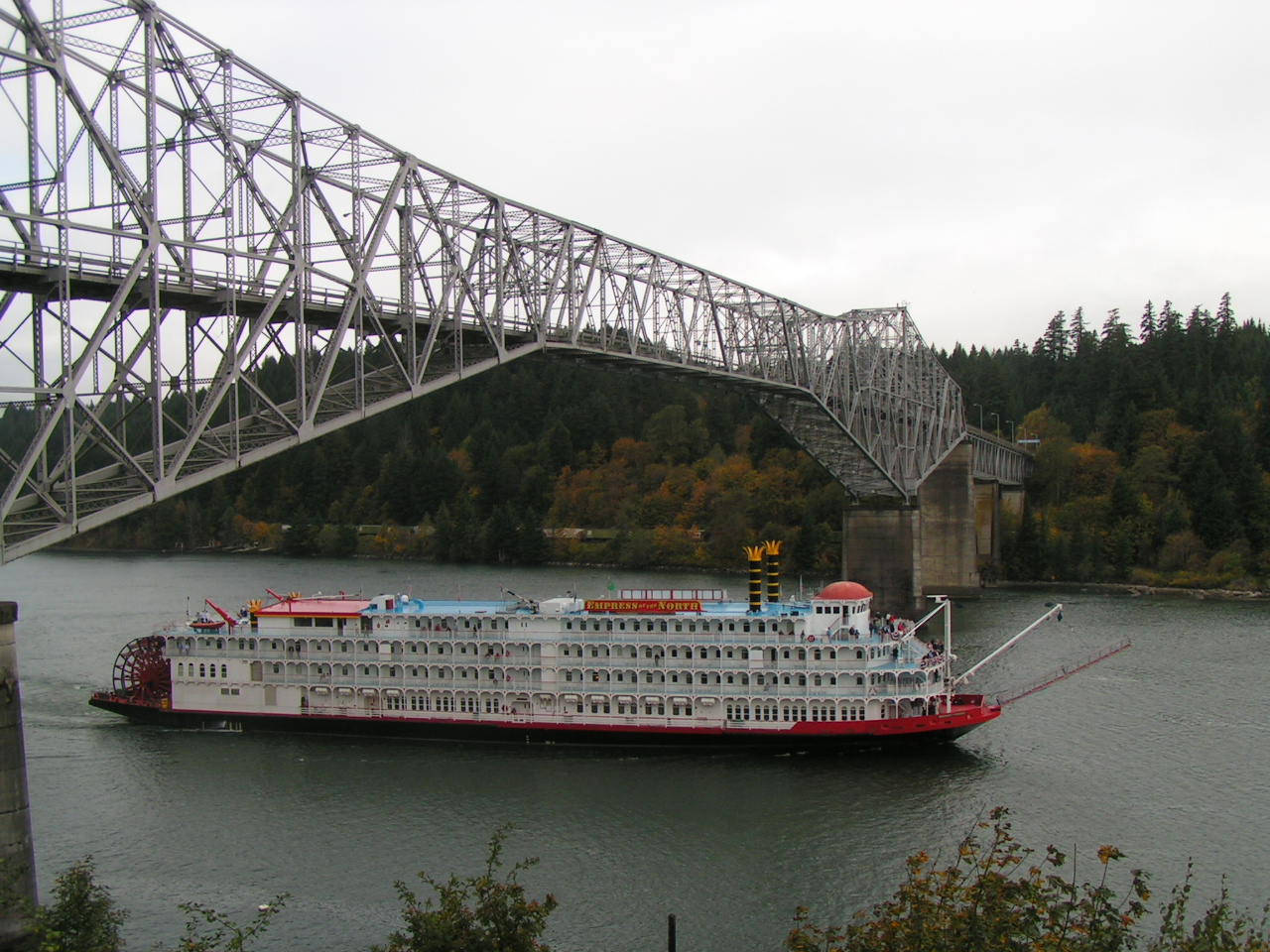
The Empress of the North passing under the Bridge of the Gods in 2005. The ship was renamed American Empress in 2014.

The American Empress, formerly the Empress of the North, is a 360-foot (110 m) diesel-powered sternwheeler built in 2002 by Nichols Brothers Boat Builders, of Freeland, Washington, the same company that was founded in Hood River, Oregon, in 1939 and was previously known as Nichols Boat Works. Although the Empress of the North was based in Juneau, Alaska (until 2013), and operated between Juneau and Seattle, she also operated cruises in Oregon that included the Columbia and Snake Rivers. In 2013, the Empress of the North was acquired by the American Queen Steamboat Company, which announced plans to rename her the American Empress and make Portland her home port starting in 2014, with cruises planned again for the Columbia and Snake Rivers. The ship was rechristened American Empress in April 2014 and placed back into service cruising the Columbia and Snake, between Astoria, Oregon, and Clarkston, Washington. Her new home port is Vancouver, Washington – which is directly across from Portland – rather than in Portland proper.

== See also ==
- Historic ferries in Oregon
- Steamboats of the Columbia River
- Steamboats of the Willamette River
- Sternwheeler Jean
