= List of geographic acronyms and initialisms =

This is a list of geographic acronyms and initialisms. That is, it's a list of the names of cities, towns, lakes, and other geographic places that are derived from acronyms. Acronyms are abbreviations formed by the initial letter or letters of the words that make up a multi-word term.

For the most part, the geographic names in this list were derived from three or more other names or words. Those derived from only two names are usually considered portmanteaus and can be found in the List of geographic portmanteaus. However, there are exceptions to this two/three rule in both lists, so it is more of a guideline than a hard-and-fast rule.

== Regions ==
=== Countries ===
- Malaysia – MALAYa, Sabah, SArawak, Singapore (until 1965), (IA for pronunciation), the former British Colony. The name also means Land of the Malays, combining the ethnic name "Malays" (from the Malay word Melayu) with the Latin-Greek suffix "-ia," meaning "land".
- Pakistan – Punjab, Afghania, Kashmir, (I for pronunciation), Sindh, and BaluchisTAN, the northern provinces of British India. The name also means Land of the Pure in Urdu and Persian.

=== Provinces ===
- Malampa Province, Vanuatu – islands that make up the province: MALakula, AMbrym, PAama
- Penama Province, Vanuatu – islands that make up the province: PENtecost, Ambae, MAewo
- Tafea Province, Vanuatu – five islands that comprise the province: Tanna, Aneityum, Futuna, Erromango and Aniwa

=== Other regions ===
- Banzare Coast, Wilkes Land, Antarctica – British–Australian–New Zealand Antarctic Research Expedition
- Benelux – BElgium NEtherlands LUXembourg
- Calabarzon – the Southern Tagalog Mainland region of the Philippines, comprising five provinces: CAvite, LAguna, BAtangas, Rizal, and QueZON
- LoVeSe – three island groups in northern Norway: LOfoten, VEsterålen, and SEnja, often used in relation to the political issue of oil extraction in the region. "LoVe" is also a common variation, referring to just Lofoten and Vesterålen.
- Luzviminda – three island groups in the Philippines: LUZon, VIsayas, and MINDAnao
- Mimaropa, Philippines – provinces comprising the Southwestern Tagalog Region: MIndoro (East and West), MArinduque, ROmblon and PAlawan
- NEPA, a common nickname of NorthEastern PennsylvaniA
- NOVA – NOrthern VirginiA
- Shoshanguve, South Africa – SOtho, SHAngaan, NGUni and VEnda, the languages of the peoples relocated to this township
- Soccsksargen, Philippines – administrative region: SOuth Cotabato, Cotabato City, North Cotabato, Sultan Kudarat, SARangani and GENeral Santos City
- SOWEGA – SOuth WEst GeorgiA
- TAG Corner – Tennessee Alabama Georgia

== Populated places ==
=== Cities and towns ===
==== Places named after companies ====
Many of these places are former company towns.

- Abanda, Alabama – Atlanta, Birmingham AND Atlantic Railroad
- Alco, Louisiana – Alexandria Lumber COmpany
- Alcoa, Tennessee – ALuminum COmpany of America
- Alpoca, West Virginia – ALpha POCAhontas Coal Company
- Ameagle, West Virginia – AMerican EAGLE Colliery
- Asco, West Virginia – Atlantic Smokeless COal Company
- Atco, Georgia – American Textile COmpany
- Atco, New Jersey – Atlantic Transport COmpany
- Ballico, California – BALLIntine COmpany
- Becco, West Virginia – Bufalo Eagle Colliery COmpany
- Cadomin, Alberta – CAnadian DOminion MINe
- Calavo Gardens, California – CALifornia AVOcado Growers Association
- Caldor, California – CALifornia DOoR Company
- Calgro, California – CALifornia GROwers Wineries
- Calpack, California – CALifornia PACKing Corporation
- Calpet, Wyoming – CALifornia PETroleum Company
- Calwa, California – CALifornia Wine Association
- Canora, Saskatchewan – CAnadian NOrthern RAilway
- Ceepeecee, British Columbia – either Canadian Packing Corporation or California Packing Corporation, or likely first Canadian, then California
- Charmco, West Virginia – CHARleston Milling COmpany
- Cipsco Park, Illinois – Central Illinois Public Service COmpany
- Cleo, Oregon – A backwards acronym for Oregon Export Lumber Company
- Clinchco, Virginia – for both CLINCHfield Railroad and CLINCHfield Coal COrporation
- Closplint, Kentucky – CLOver SPLINT Coal Company
- Cofoco, West Virginia – COal FOrk COal Company, now known as Coal, West Virginia
- Colwich, Kansas – COLorado and WICHita Railroad Company
- Cominco, Saskatchewan – COnsolidated MINing and Smelting COmpany
- Copco, California – California Oregon Power COmpany
- Cumbo, West Virginia – CUMberland Valley Railroad, Baltimore and Ohio Railroad
- Delanson, New York – DELaware ANd HudSON Railroad
- Domex, Saskatchewan – DOMe EXploration, Ltd.
- Elco, Illinois – E. Levenworth and COmpany General Store (from the abbreviation "E. L. Co" stenciled on boxes in front of the store)
- Falco, Alabama – Florida–Alabama Land COmpany
- Gamerco, New Mexico – Gallup AMERican COal Company
- Gimco City, Indiana – General Insulation and Manufacturing COmpany (now part of Alexandria, Indiana)
- Grenora, North Dakota – GREat NOrthern RAilway
- Harco, Illinois – HARrisburg COlliery Coal Company
- Herpoco, California – HERcules POwder COmpany
- Ioco, Port Moody, British Columbia – Imperial Oil COrporation or COmpany (actual name: Imperial Oil, Ltd.)
- Irmulco, California – IRvine and MUir Lumber COmpany
- Kayjay, Kentucky – Kentucky–Jellico Coal Company
- Kicco, Florida – Kissimmee Island Cattle COmpany
- Kofa, Arizona – King OF Arizona Mine
- Kyrock, Kentucky – KentuckY ROCK Asphalt Company
- Labuco, Alabama – LAcey–BUek Iron COmpany
- Lacjac, California – LAChman & JACobi
- Latexo, Texas – LouisianA TEXas Orchard Company
- Lobeco, South Carolina – LOng, BEllamy, and COmpany
- Lorado, West Virginia – LORAin Coal and DOck Company
- Mercoal, Alberta – McLeod (E for pronunciation) River Hard COAL Company
- Micco, West Virginia – Main Island Creek COal Company
- Mico, Texas – Medina Irrigation COmpany
- Mococo, California – MOuntain COpper COmpany
- Mokane, Missouri – MissOuri KANsas and Eastern Railway
- Mopeco, California – MOhawk PEtroleum COmpany
- Nacmine, Alberta – North America Collieries, Ltd. plus the word MINE
- Naplate, Illinois – NAtional PLATE Glass Company
- Nolalu, Ontario – NOrthern LAnd LUmber Company
- Norco, California – NORth COrona Land Company
- Norco, Louisiana – New Orleans Refinery COmpany
- Norco, Saskatchewan – NORanda COmpany
- Norpak, North Dakota – NORthern PACific Railroad (with a K replacing the C)
- Nyando, New York – New York AND Ottawa Railway, former station on the line; now known as Rooseveltown
- Ocapos, Arizona – A backwards acronym for SOuthern PAcific COmpany (i.e. Southern Pacific Railroad)
- Ohaton, Alberta – Osler, HAmmond, and NanTON, Winnipeg financial firm
- Orenco, Oregon – OREgon Nursery COmpany
- Orseco, Oregon – ORegon SEcurities COmpany; name changed to Champion now historical
- Parco, Wyoming – Producers And Refiners COrporation
- Pennsuco, Florida – PENNsylvania SUgar COmpany
- Phosmico, Florida – PHOSphate MIning COmpany
- Praco, Alabama – PRAtt Consolidated Coal COmpany
- Raco, Michigan – Richardson & Avery COmpany
- Raeco, Washington – Rodes, Appel, and Earnest plus COmpany
- Reco, Alberta – REliance COal Company
- Sasco, Arizona – Southern Arizona Smelter COmpany
- Saspamco, Texas – San Antonio Sewer Pipe (A for pronunciation) Manufacturing COmpany
- Seco, Kentucky – South East COal Company
- Sedco Hills, California – South Elsinore Development COmpany
- Seroco, North Dakota – SEars ROebuck and COmpany
- Siboco, Oregon – SIuslaw BOom COmpany
- Sterco, Alberta – STERling COllieries
- Stoil, California – STandard OIL Company (former location of a pumping station)
- Sumica, Florida – Société Universelle des Mines, Industrie Commerce et Agriculture
- Svit, Slovakia – Slovenské VIzkózové Továrne (English: "Slovak Viscose Works")
- Talco, Texas – Texas, Arkansas, and Louisiana Candy COmpany (seen on a box of candy)
- Tapco, Arizona – The Arizona Power COmpany
- Tapoco, North Carolina – TAllassee POwer COmpany
- Tracoal, West Virginia – TRAce Fork COAL Company
- Tumco, California – The United Mines COmpany
- Upalco, Utah – Utah Power And Light COmpany
- Vancorum, Colorado – VANadium CORporation of AMerica, with a substitution of a U for the A
- Vicco, Kentucky – Virginia Iron Coal and Coke COmpany
- Weslaco, Texas – W. E. Stewart LAnd COmpany
- Wevaco, West Virginia – WEst VirginiA COlliery Company
- Wiscoal, Kentucky – WISconsin COAL Company
- Zimco, Alabama – ZImmerman Manufacturing COmpany

==== Places named after people ====
- Aflex, Kentucky – A. F. LEckie (X instead of CK)
- Aitch, Pennsylvania – Aumen, Isett, Trexler, Crexwell, and Harker, town founders
- Alcolu, South Carolina – ALderman COldwell LUla; mill owner, friend, and eldest daughter, respectively
- Almadane, Louisiana – three early settlers: AL Damereal, MAnn Huddleston, and DAN Knight + E for euphony
- Anarene, Texas – ANnA LauRENE Graham, daughter of early pioneer J. M. Keen
- Anco, Kentucky – ANderson COmbs, first postmaster
- Arbyrd, Missouri – A. R. BYRD, landowner
- Archerwill, Saskatchewan – councilors ARCHie Hamilton Campbell and ERvie Edvin Hanson, and secretary-treasurer WILLiam S. Pierce of Barrier Valley Rural Municipality
- Arjay, Kentucky – R. J. Asher, coal operator
- Armelgra, Alberta – ARthur MELville GRAce, engineer for the Canadian Pacific Railway
- Arvida, Quebec – ARthur VIning DAvis, president of Aluminum Company of Canada
- Awe, Kentucky – Anthony Wayne Everman, first postmaster
- Bahama, North Carolina – three leading families of the community: BAll, HArris, and MAngum
- Balmorhea, Texas – BALcolm, MOrrow, RHEA, town founders
- Benld, Illinois – BEN L. Dorsey, early settler
- Bolada, Arizona – three family names: BOnes LAne DAndera
- Bresaylor, Saskatchewan – three founding families: BREmner, SAYers, and TayLOR
- Bromer, Indiana – early settlers: Boyd, Roll, Oldham, McCoy, Ellis, and Reid
- Bucoda, Missouri – early settlers: BUchanan, COburn, and DAvis
- Bucoda, Washington – investors in local industry: J. M. BUckley, Samuel COulter, John B. DAvid
- Cabarton, Idaho – C. A. BARTON, official of the Boise Payette Lumber Company (a former company town of that company)
- Cadams, Nebraska – C. ADAMS, local banker
- Chaney, Oklahoma – six family names: Carey, Hull, Adams, Nichols, Edmonds, Yarnold
- Charlo, Port Elizabeth, South Africa – CHARles LOvemore, landowner
- Comrey, Alberta – names of six early settlers: Columbus Larson, Ole Roen, Mons Roen, R. Rolfson, J. J. Everson, Ed Yager
- Dacono, Colorado – DAisy Baum, COra Van Vorhies and NOra Brooks
- Delmar, Iowa – initials of six women on the first train to the new town: Della, Emma, Laura, Marie, Anna, and Rose.
- Edmore, Michigan – EDwin MOoRE, the first settler of the village
- Emida, Idaho – East, MIller, and DAwson, three early family names
- Eram, Oklahoma – four children of Ed Oates: Eugene, Roderick, Anthony, and Marie
- Ethanac, California – ETHAN A. Chase, landowner and political leader (town is now named Romoland, California)
- Faloma, Oregon – Force Love Moore, three original land-owners, with added vowels
- Fastrill, Texas – F. F. FArrington, P. H. STRause, and Will HILL, postmaster and two lumbermen
- Gamoca, West Virginia – GAuley, MOley, and CAmpbell
- Gathon, Illinois – Gallager, Adams, Tremblay, and Herzog (ON added by the post office)
- Geekabee Hill, Western Australia – George Kershaw Brown
- Germfask Township, Michigan – town founders: John Grant, Matthew Edge, George Robinson, Thaddeus Mead, Dr. W. W. French, Ezekiel Ackley, Oscar (O.D.) Sheppard, and Hezekiah Knaggs
- Golah, New York – coined by Rev H. W. Howard from five local family names (names unknown)
- Hacoda, Alabama – HArt, COleman, DAvis, three local businessmen
- Halbrite, Saskatchewan – three Canadian Pacific Railway engineers: HALl, BRuce, WhITE
- Helechawa, Kentucky – HELEn CHAse WAlbridge, daughter of W. Delancy Walbridge, first president of Ohio and Kentucky Railroad
- Hemaruka, Alberta – daughters of A. E. Warren, General Manager of Canadian National Railway: HElen, MArgaret, RUth and KAthleen
- Hisega, South Dakota – six women who built a camp site and country club at the location: Helen Scroggs, Ida Anding, Sadie Robinson, Ethel Brink, Grace Wasson, and Ada Pike
- Itmann, West Virginia – Isaac T. MANN, president of Pocahontas Consolidated Coal Company
- Jacam, Manitoba – J. A. CAMpbell, politician
- Jayem, Kentucky – John Marshall Robsion Sr., congressman
- Jay Em, Wyoming – Jim Moore, cattle rancher
- Jayenne, West Virginia – Johnson Newlon Camden, US senator
- Jaype, Idaho – John P. Weyerhaeuser Jr., president of Potlatch Lumber Company
- Jetson, Kentucky – J. E. Taylor and SON, co-owners of a local business
- Kinnorwood, Illinois – H. L. KINney, George H. NORris, Robert P. WOODworth, land owners
- Klej Grange, Maryland – Joseph William Drexel's four daughters: Katherine, Lucy, Elizabeth, and Josephine
- Kragon, Kentucky – K. RAGON, founder and president of the Kentucky Wood Products Company
- Lecoma, Missouri – three local merchants: LEnox, COmstock, and MArtin
- Le Mars, Iowa – eight women from Cedar Rapids on a railroad excursion who were asked to name the town. Two of the letters, L and M, represent two women each: Lucy Ford and Laura Walker; Elizabeth Underhill or Ellen Cleghorn; Mary Weare and Martha Weare; Adeline Swain; Rebecca Smith; Sarah Reynolds.
- Lookeba, Oklahoma – LOwe, KElly and BAker, town founders (with an extra O)
- Mabana, Washington – MABel ANderson, daughter of an early settler, plus A for pronunciation
- Mabscott, West Virginia – MABel SCOTT
- Maleb, Alberta – initials of the Bowen family: Morley, Amy, Lorne, Elizabeth, Bowen; disagreement over whether these are the initials of the parents or the children
- Maljamar, New Mexico – MALcolm, JAnet, MARgaret, children of William Mitchell, oil operator
- Marenisco Township, Michigan – either MARy ENId SCOtt, or MAry RElief NIles SCOtt, the wife of Emmet H. Scott, a timber producer
- Marietta, Ohio – MARIe AntoinETTe plus A
- Marmarth, North Dakota – MARgaret MARTHa Fitch, very young granddaughter of A. J. Ealing, railroad president
- Mesena, Georgia – coined by Dr. J. F. Hamilton, using the initial letters of the first names of his six daughters (names unknown)
- Milo, Oklahoma – initials of four daughters of J. W. Johnson (names unknown)
- Mohall, North Dakota – Martin O. HALL, founder and first postmaster
- Mohrland, Utah – four investors in a coal mine: Mays, Orem, Heiner, and Rice plus LAND
- Natal, Oregon – NAThAnieL C. Dale, local landowner and Columbia County clerk
- Nemato, Port Alfred, South Africa – NElson MAndela TOwnship
- Newport, Texas – initials of seven founding families: Norman, Ezell, Welch, Pruitt, Owsley, Reiger, and Turner
- Neyami, Georgia – three subdevelopers: NEwton, YAncy, MIlner
- Norvelt, Pennsylvania – EleaNOR RooseVELT
- Pawn, Oregon – local residents who applied for a post office: Poole, Ackerley, Worthington, Nolen
- Peedee, Kentucky – Pumphrey David Smith, landowner
- Primghar, Iowa – initials of eight people who had a major part in platting the town: Pumphrey; Roberts; Inman; McCormack; Green; Hayes or Hays; Albright; Rereick or Renck
- Renwer, Manitoba – A. E. WarREN and W. E. Roberts, railway officials
- Reston, Virginia – Robert E. Simon, founder of Reston, plus TON
- Safe, Missouri – possibly early settlers: Shinkle, Aufderheide, Fann, and Essman
- Soda, Texas – initials of four names submitted to the post office (names unknown; now a ghost town)
- Tako, Saskatchewan – homesteaders: Taylor, Aked, Krips, Olsen
- Tamalco, Illinois – W. H. TAylor, John M(A)cLaren, Frank COlwell, prominent locals
- Tejay, Kentucky – Thomas Jefferson Asher, landowner, founder, and judge
- Texico, Illinois – TEXas, Illinois, Claybourn, Osborn, the latter two being local family names
- Wabd, Kentucky – William A. B. Davis, post office founder
- Wahjamega, Michigan – William A. Heartt, James A. Montgomery, and Edgar George Avery
- Wascott, Wisconsin – W. A. SCOTT, railroad company president
- Walong, California – W. A. LONG, railroad official
- Willows, Saskatchewan – WILliam Gibson LOWeS, owner of the first store
- Wimauma, Florida – WIlma, MAUd, MAry, daughters of Captain C. H. Davis, first postmaster

==== Other places ====
- Abac, Georgia – Abraham Baldwin Agricultural College
- Alorton, Illinois – ALuminum ORe plus TON
- Anzac, Alberta – Australia New Zealand Army Corps
- Bacova, Virginia – BAth COunty VirginiA
- Barford, Saskatchewan – BArrier River FORD
- Biola, California – Bible Institute Of Los Angeles
- Cal-Nev-Ari, Nevada – CALifornia, NEVada, ARIzona
- Claycomo, Missouri – CLAY COunty, MissOuri
- Covada, Washington – six nearby mines: Columbia, Orin, Verin, Ada, Dora, and Alice
- Cudsaskwa Beach, Saskatchewan – CUDworth, SASKatchewan WAkaw
- Denare Beach, Saskatchewan – DEpartment of NAtural REsources
- Hico, Missouri – HIckory COunty (although Hico is in Dallas County)
- Hocomo, Missouri – HOwell COunty MissOuri
- Ilasco, Missouri – elements and ingredients of cement: Iron, Lime, Aluminum, Silica, Carbon, and Oxygen
- Kenova, West Virginia – KENtucky, Ohio, VirginiA
- Kenora, Ontario – three predecessor communities: KEewatin, NOrman and RAt Portage
- Lockridge, Oklahoma – Logan, Oklahoma, Canadian, and Kingfisher Counties plus RIDGE
- Macy, Nebraska – (O)MAha AgenCY (location of Indian agency to the Maha or Omaha people)
- Mandaree, North Dakota – MANdan, HiDAtsa and REE, the three tribes whose reservation the place is on. (Ree is another name for the Arikara)
- Molanosa, Saskatchewan – MOntreal LAke, NOrthern SAskatchewan
- Nalcrest, Florida – National Association of Letter Carriers plus REST, retirement community for postmen
- Noida, Uttar Pradesh – New Okhla Industrial Development Authority
- NOLA – A common nickname for New Orleans, LouisianA
- Okarche, Oklahoma – OKlahoma ARapaho CHEyenne
- Omphghent Township, Illinois – Our Mother of Perpetual Help + GHENT (city in Belgium)
- Ovapa, West Virginia – Ohio, VirginiA, PennsylvaniA
- Pen Mar, Maryland – PENnsylvania and MARyland
- Penowa, Pennsylvania – PENnsylvania, Ohio, West VirginiA
- Sharedon Park, South Africa – Self Help Association of REsidents plus DON, a neighbourhood somewhere in the Cape Town area
- Texarkana, Texas/Arkansas – TEXas ARKansas LouisiANA
- Ti, Oklahoma – a backwards acronym for Indian Territory
- Usna, Oklahoma – United States North America
- Usona, Alberta – United States Of North America
- Usona, California – United States Of North America
- Veyo, Utah – either Virtue, Enterprise, Youth, or Order or VErdure and YOuth
- Viropa, West Virginia – VIRginia, Ohio, PennsylvaniA
- Walden, Ontario – WAters, Lively, DENison, three of the several communities that merged to form the town
- Wamac, Illinois – WAshington, MArion, and Clinton Counties
- Wyco, West Virginia – WYoming COunty

=== Neighborhoods ===
Many of these names were the result of neighborhood rebranding, first in New York, and then in other cities. The names were mostly coined in imitation of Soho in Manhattan.

==== New York ====
- DoBro – DOwntown BROoklyn
- Dumbo, Brooklyn – Down Under the Manhattan Bridge Overpass
- FiDi – FInancial DIstrict
- NoHo, Manhattan – NOrth of HOuston Street
- Nolita – NOrth of Little ITAly
- NoMad, Manhattan – NOrth of MADison Square Park
- Sobro – SOuth BROnx
- SoHo, Manhattan – SOuth of HOuston Street
- Tribeca – TRIangle BElow CAnal Street

==== Los Angeles ====
- DTLA – DownTown Los Angeles
- NoHo – NOrth HOllywood
- SoLA – SOuth Los Angeles
- WeHo – WEst HOllywood

==== Denver, Colorado ====
- LoDo – LOwer DOwntown
- LoHi – LOwer HIghland
- RiNo – RIver NOrth Art District
- SoBro – SOuth BROadway

==== Metropolitan and suburban areas ====
- Camanava – the Northern Manila District of Metro Manila, Philippines; cities: CAloocan, MAlabon, NAvotas, VAlenzuela
- Gerbangkertosusila – official acronym for the Surabaya Extended Metropolitan Area in East Java, Indonesia: GREsik BANGkalan MojoKERTO SUrabaya SIdoarjo LAmongan
- Jabodetabek – the capital of Indonesia and suburbs: JAkarta, BOgor, DEpok, TAngerang and BEKasi
- MM – Metro Manila, a metropolitan area and seat of government of the Philippines
- Muntapat, Metro Manila, Philippines – three cities: MUNtinlupa, TAguig, PATeros
- Muntiparlas, Metro Manila, Philippines – three cities: MUNTInlupa, PARañaque, LAS Piñas
- Soweto, Johannesburg, South Africa – SOuth WEstern TOwnships

==== In other cities ====
- COB – City of Balanga, provincial capital of Bataan, Philippines
- CSFP – City of San Fernando, Pampanga, provincial capital of Pampanga, Philippines
- NoBo, Traverse City, Michigan – NOrth BOardman Lake District
- NoDa, Charlotte, NC – NOrth DAvidson Street
- NoMa, Washington, DC – NOrth of MAssachusetts Avenue
- NoPa, San Francisco, California – NOrth of the PAnhandle
- NuLu, Louisville, Kentucky – a portmanteau of "New" and "Louisville"
- Lamasco, Evansville, Indiana – town founders: John and William LAw, James B. MAcCall, Lucius H. SCOtt
- SoBe, Miami Beach, Florida – SOuth BEach
- SoBo, Mumbai – SOuth BOmbay
- Sobro, Nashville, Tennessee – SOuth of BROadway
- SoDo, Seattle, Washington – originally SOuth of the DOme; now SOuth of DOwntown
- SoHo, Hong Kong – SOuth of HOllywood Road
- SoHo, London, Ontario – SOuth of HOrton Street
- SoHo (Tampa), Florida – SOuth of HOward Avenue
- Soho, West Midlands (Birmingham, England) – SOuth HOuse
- SoMa, San Francisco, California – SOuth of MArket Street
- SoMa, Vancouver, British Columbia – SOuth MAin
- SoPi, Paris – SOuth of PIgalle
- QC – Quezon City, Metro Manila, Philippines

== Natural features ==
=== Bodies of water ===
- Ayceecee Creek, British Columbia – Alpine Club of Canada (creek draining glaciers on Three Bears Mountain)
- Lake Carasaljo – daughters of Joseph Brick, owner of local Bergen Iron Works: CARrie (A for pronunciation), SALly, and JOsephine
- Lake Chaweva – CHArleston, WEst VirginiA
- Copco Lake, California (now drained) – California Oregon Power COmpany
- Emar Lake, Saskatchewan – Eldorado Mining And Refining
- Lake Jacomo, Missouri – JAckson COunty, MissOuri
- Owaa Lake, Saskatchewan – Outdoor Writers Association of America (to mark a meeting of that organization in June 1967)
- Lake Jodeco, Georgia – JOnesboro DEvelopment COrporation
- Sareco Bay, Saskatchewan – SAskatchewan REsearch COuncil; contains Sareco Island
- Snafu Lake, Yukon – Situation Normal, All Fucked Up (drained by Snafu Creek); there is also a Snafu Lake in Ontario and a Snafu Creek in Northwest Territories
- Swenoda Lake and Swenoda Township, Swift County, Minnesota – SWEdish NOrwegian DAnish, nationalities of settlers in that region
- Lake Taneycomo, Missouri – TANEY COunty, MissOuri
- Tarfu Lake, Yukon – Things Are Really Fucked Up (fed and drained by Tarfu Creek)
- Lake Wagejo, Michigan – WAlter Koelz, GEorge Stanley, JOhn Brumm, zoologists

=== Topography ===
- Delmarva Peninsula – DELaware MARyland VirginiA
- Fasp Mountain, British Columbia – First Aid Ski Patrol
- Isar Mountain, Washington/British Columbia – Internation Search And Rescue
- Multorpor Butte or Mountain – a mountain near Mount Hood: MULTnomah County, ORegon, PORtland
- Tamu Massif – Texas A&M University; large undersea volcano in the western Pacific named by scientist after the school he taught at
- Ubyssey Glacier, Mount Garibaldi, British Columbia – University of British Columbia
- Veeocee Mountain, British Columbia – Varsity Outdoor Club of the University of British Columbia

== Others ==
- Alwinsal – potash mine at Guernsey, Saskatchewan named after a French–German consortium that invested: 1) Mines Domanials de Potasse d'ALsace (French) 2) WINtersall AG (German) 3) SALzfuther AG (German)
- Amdewanda No. 630 – school near Eston, Saskatchewan; first trustees: Clyde AMey, Sid DEan, Robert WAmsley plus NDA for alliteration
- Barholis No. 746 – school near Glenbain, Saskatchewan; early settlers: BARnes, HOLmes and InnIS
- Elanco (commonly used name for Eastern Lancaster County School District) – Eastern LANcaster COunty
- 6489 Golevka, asteroid named for three observatories that studied it for the Yarkovski effect – GOLdstone Observatory in California; EVpatoria Planetary Radar, Yevpatoria, Ukraine; KAshima Space Technology Center, located in Kashima, Ibaraki, Japan
- Kemoca Park, Montmartre, Saskatchewan – KEndal, MOtmartre, and CAdiac; three communities the park serves
- Mohonasen High School, Rotterdam, New York – MOHawk, ONOndaga, SENeca (with an A replacing the last O), three tribes that once lived in the Rotterdam area
- Odhill railway station, Manitoba – O. D. HILL, K.C.
- Rawebb railway station, Manitoba – RAlph WEBB, politician
- Camp Shagabec, Saskatchewan – church campground for parishes at Shaunavon, Hazenmore, Assinaboia, Govenlock, Abbey, Bracken, Eastend, Consul-Cabri-Climax
- Solanco School District, Lancaster County, Pennsylvania – SOuthern LANcaster COunty
- Viento State Park, near Hood River, Oregon – Henry VIllard, William ENdicott, TOlman

== See also ==
- List of acronyms
- List of airport codes
- List of geographic portmanteaus
- List of geographic anagrams and ananyms
- List of country groupings
