= List of lakes of Yukon =

This is an incomplete list of lakes of Yukon, a territory of Canada.

The largest lake of Yukon is Kluane Lake at 409 km^{2} (158 sq mi) located at an elevation of 781 m (2,562 ft).

== Gallery ==
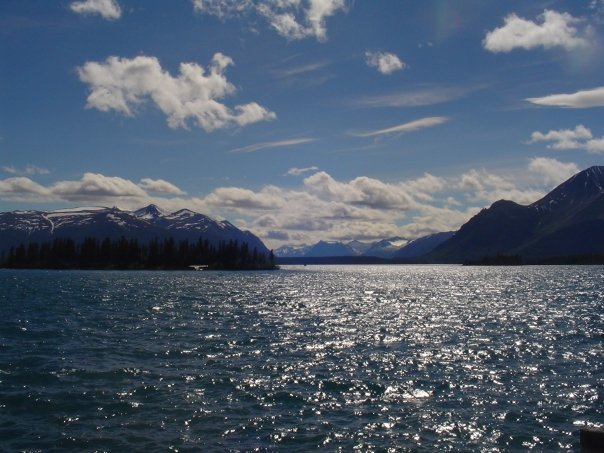
Atlin Lake is the largest lake partly in Yukon

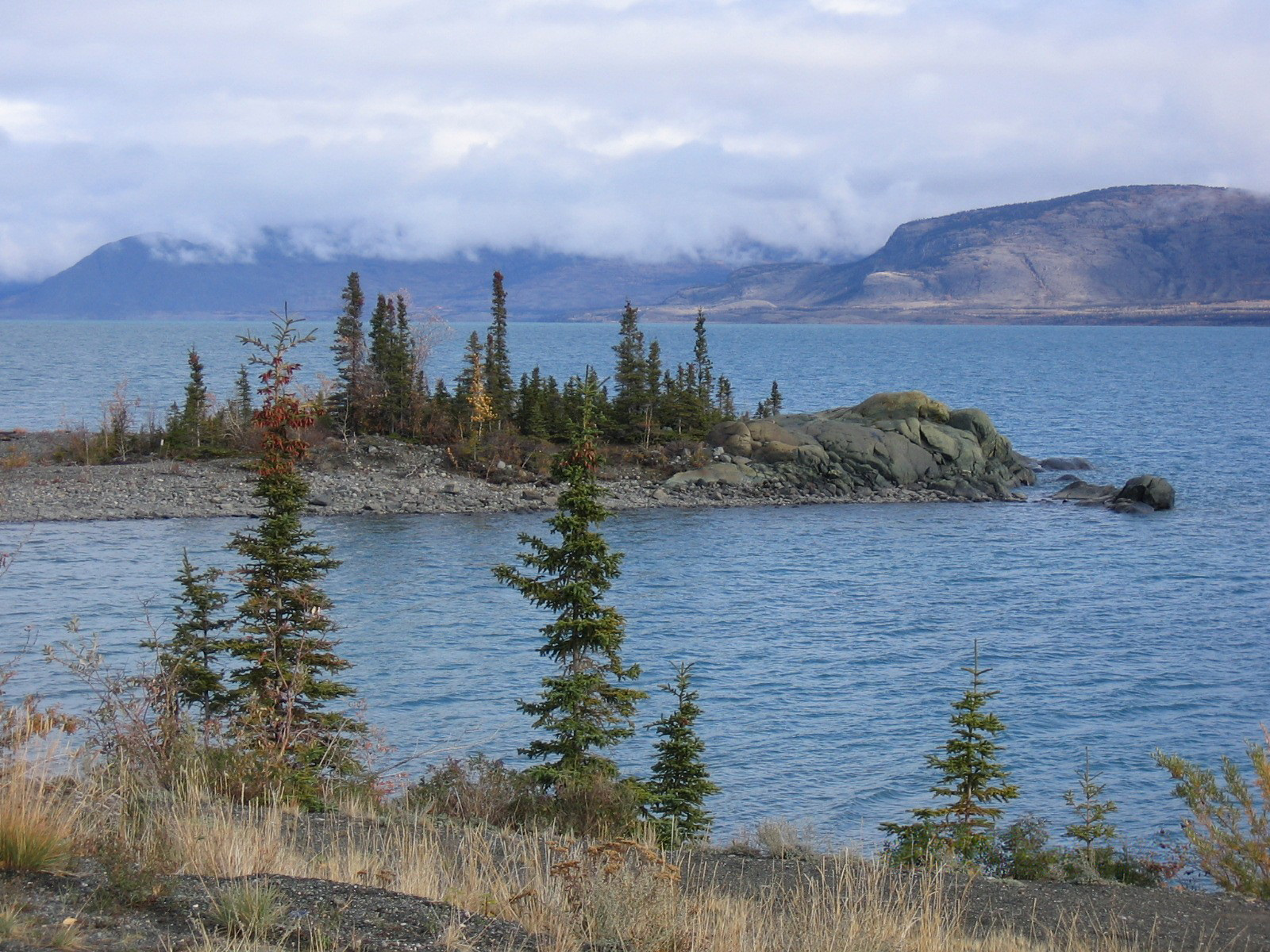
Kluane Lake is the largest entirely in Yukon

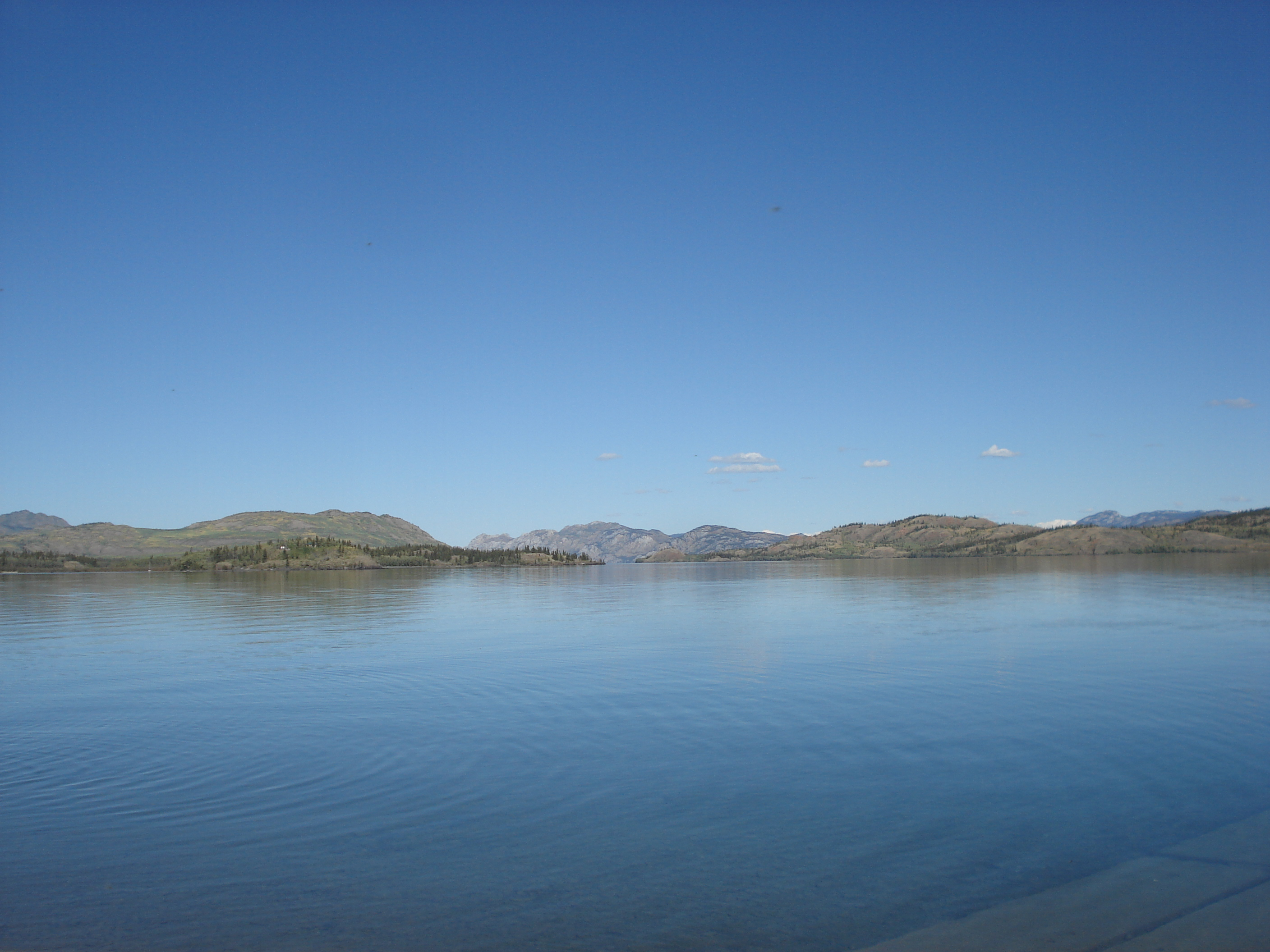
Lake Laberge in 2010

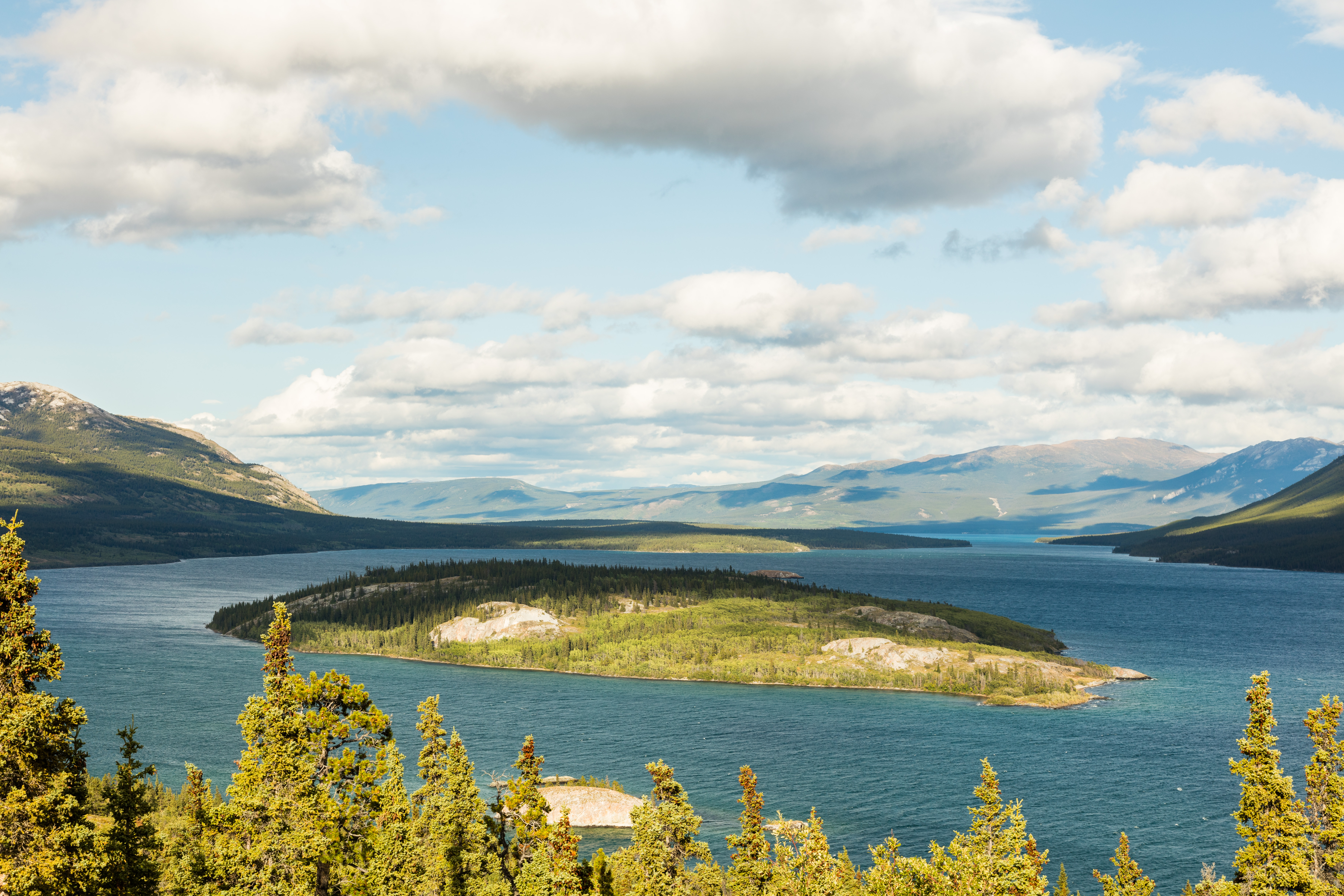
Tagish Lake is the longest and deepest in the territory

== List of lakes ==
Lakes in Yukon by size and elevation
Lake	Length		Width		Area		Elevation		Average depth		Maximum depth		Notes	Sources
Lake	km	mi	km	mi	km^{2}	sq mi	m	ft	m	ft	m	ft	Notes	Sources
Aishihik Lake	53	33	6	3.7	147.47	56.94	930	3,050	35.5	116	120	390		
Alligator Lake					6.3	2.4			5.4	18				
Annie Lake	2.41	1.50					107	351					Also partly in British Columbia	
Atlin Lake	81	50	3–8	1.9–5.0	791	305	669	2,195	85.6	281	289	948	Mostly in British Columbia	
Barlow Lake	1.2	0.75	0.7	0.43	0.9	0.35	610–760	2,000–2,490			5.5	18		
Bennett Lake	41	25	3.7	2.3	96.80	37.37	656	2,152	61.9	203	123	404	Also partly in British Columbia.	
Big Kalzas Lake					42	16	780	2,560	65	213				
Black Lake (Munroe Lake)	6.4	4.0	0.8	0.50									Also partly in British Columbia	
Blind Lake														
Bonnet Plume Lake					3.7	1.4	1,067–1,121	3,501–3,678			12	39		
Braeburn Lake	6.2	3.9	1.9	1.2	5.62	2.17	695	2,280	14.3	47	50	160		
Bruce Lake	4.4	2.7			2.5	0.97	760–910	2,490–2,990			35	115		
Cantile Lake					2.17	0.84	901	2,956			18	59		
Canyon Lake														
Caribou Lake	1.6	0.99	0.8	0.50	0.52	0.20	820	2,690	16.5	54				
Chadburn Lake	4.5	2.8	1.1	0.68	1.44	0.56	877	2,877	15	49	43	141		
Chadden Lake					0.55	0.21	661	2,169			30	98		
Chapman Lake	2	1.2	1.3	0.81	1.29	0.50	981	3,219	8	26	12	39		
Chootla Lake														
Claire Lake	24	15	1.6	0.99	20.4	7.9			53	174				
Clark Lake					3.0	1.2	610–760	2,000–2,490			23	75		
Coffee Lake					1.36	0.53	814	2,671						
Coghlan Lake	8	5.0	1.6	0.99	8.23	3.18			24	79				
Crag Lake	5.6	3.5	1.2	0.75	5.67	2.19	760	2,490						
Crystal Lake	2.5	1.6	0.8	0.50	1.77	0.68	760–915	2,493–3,002						
Dalayee Lake	10.3	6.4	1.6	0.99	10.6	4.1	970	3,180			46	151		
Daughney Lake	6	3.7			4.8	1.9	915–1,065	3,002–3,494			27	89		
Davis Lake (north)	2.5	1.6			2.8	1.1	305–460	1,001–1,509			23	75		
Davis Lake (south)	2.5	1.6					305–460	1,001–1,509			27	89		
Dezadeash Lake	19	12	9.7	6.0	82.50	31.85	690	2,260	4.1	13	7.4	24		
Diamain Lake	10	6.2	2	1.2	18.80	7.26	460–610	1,510–2,000			25	82		
Divide Lake	10.4	6.5	0.2	0.12	0.2	0.077	1,040	3,410			10.4	34		
Dog Lake	1.9	1.2	0.5	0.31	0.8	0.31	300–460	980–1,510						
Dogpack Lake					1.76	0.68								
Dragon Lake	16	9.9	0.6	0.37	7.3	2.8	760–910	2,490–2,990			10	33		
Drury Lake	24	15			0.27	0.10	715	2,346			295	968		
Duo Lake					0.24	0.093	1,200	3,900						
Dwarf Lake					0.5	0.19	760–910	2,490–2,990			18	59		
Earn Lake					35.53	13.72								
Elliot Lake	1.9	1.2	0.8	0.50	1.13	0.44	915–1,065	3,002–3,494			22	72		
Emerald Lake														
Enger Lake					1.17	0.45	741	2,431	6.3	21	16	52		
Ess Lake					13.300	5.135								
Ethel Lake	21	13	2.5	1.6	46.10	17.80	760	2,490	31	102	62	203		
Fairchild Lake	4.0	2.5	0.8	0.50	1.69	0.65	610–760	2,000–2,490			4.5	15		
Fairweather Lake	12	7.5	3	1.9	18.90	7.30								
Finlayson Lake	14.5	9.0	2.2	1.4	20.70	7.99	946	3,104			11.3	37		
Fire Lake														
Fish Lake	11.3	7.0	1.2	0.75	13.86	5.35	1,123	3,684	16.5	54	37	121		
Fisheye Lake					0.36	0.14	773	2,536	7.6	25	21	69	Sources differ on spelling "Fisheye" or "Fish Eye"	
Fortin Lake					14.98	5.78								
Fox Lake	4	2.5	0.8	0.50	16.02	6.19	957	3,140	28.6	94	47	154		
Frances Lake	37	23	2.4	1.5	99.41	38.38	734	2,408	93	305	31	102		
Frank Lake	12.9	8.0	0.8	0.50	5.86	2.26								
Frederick Lake	9	5.6	0.7	0.43	4.45	1.72	703–762	2,306–2,500			24.5	80		
Frenchman Lake	18	11	1.6	0.99	14.41	5.56	575	1,886	14.6	48	65	213		
Gillespie Lake	2.8	1.7	0.5	0.31	0.63	0.24	1,370	4,490			22.3	73		
Gladstone Lake - Central					0.29	0.11								
Gladstone Lake - North					0.24	0.093								
Gladstone Lake - South					0.79	0.31								
Glenlyon Lake														
Gloria Lake II					0.09	0.035	507	1,663			20	66		
Granite Lake					1.74	0.67								
Grass Lakes														
Gravel Lake					0.38	0.15	628	2,060			0.9	3.0		
Haldane Lake					0.10	0.039	691	2,267						
Halfway Lake – East	1.5	0.93					760	2,490			4.2	14	Elevation given is a maximum figure	
Halfway Lake – West	1.5	0.93			0.9	0.35	760	2,490			4.7	15	Elevation given is a maximum figure	
Hanson Lake – North					1.0	0.39	760	2,490			19	62	Elevation given is a maximum figure	
Hanson Lake – South	5.0	3.1	0.8	0.50	3.2	1.2	760	2,490			33	108	Elevation given is a maximum figure	
Hidden Lake 1					0.34	0.13	665	2,182			20	66		
Hidden Lake 3					0.04	0.015	665	2,182			15	49		
Hour Lake					0.03	0.012	689	2,260						
Howard Lake - North					2.00	0.77								
Howard Lake - South					0.59	0.23								
Hungry Lake	8	5.0			6.6	2.5	305–460	1,001–1,509			4	13		
Hutshi Lake – Central					3.24	1.25								
Hutshi Lake – North					5.10	1.97								
Ibex Lake					0.31	0.12								
Jackfish Lake (Yukon)					1.14	0.44	797	2,615	5.3	17	21	69		
Janet Lake	11	6.8	2	1.2	17.2	6.6	572	1,877			103	338		
Jim Cook (Tele) Lake					4.78	1.85	1,150	3,770						
Jojo Lake	11	6.8	1.6	0.99	6.4	2.5	888	2,913	31	102	52	171	Sometimes spelled "Jo-Jo"	
Judas Lake					0.04	0.015	732	2,402			12	39		
Kathleen Lake					33.76	13.03	731	2,398	52.2	171	111	364		
Kathleen Lake – Lower	11.0	6.8	8.0	5.0	33.8	13.1	734.5	2,410						
Kathleen Lake – Upper	5.5	3.4	1.4	0.87	5.38	2.08	736	2,415			110	360		
Kloo Lake					11.61	4.48	837	2,746	13	43	12	39		
Kluane Lake	81	50	8	5.0	408.21	157.61	781	2,562	31	102	91	299	Largest lake entirely within Yukon	
Klukshu Lake	5	3.1	0.5	0.31	1.29	0.50	706	2,316	21.5	71	31	102		
Kookatsoon Lake	0.8	0.50			0.18	0.069	762	2,500						
Kusawa Lake	74	46	0.8–2.4	0.50–1.49	140.18	54.12	671	2,201	54	177	140	460		
Ladue Lake					2.4	0.93	760	2,490			24	79	Elevation given is a maximum figure	
Lake 13-562					0.23	0.089	698	2,290	4.5	15	7	23	Unnamed lake about 3 km (1.9 mi) north of Watson Lake.	
Lake 13-563					0.12	0.046	831	2,726	2.5	8.2	3	9.8	Unnamed lake adjacent to Frances Lake.	
Lake 13-587					0.11	0.042	664	2,178	4	13	6	20	Unnamed lake adjacent to Marsh Lake.	
Lake 14-584					0.21	0.081	1,121	3,678	5.3	17			Unnamed lake in Tombstone Territorial Park	
Lake Laberge	50	31	2.5–6.5	1.6–4.0	200.99	77.60	628	2,060	54	177	146	479		
Lewes Lake					1.31	0.51	728	2,388	17	56	40	130		
Little Atlin Lake	23	14	2.5–3	1.6–1.9	40.32	15.57	669	2,195	10.6	35	42	138		
Little Braeburn Lake					0.79	0.31								
Little Fox Lake					2.27	0.88	818	2,684			50	160		
Little Fox Lake – North basin									16.3	53	44	144		
Little Fox Lake – South basin					1.37	0.53			10.7	35	50	160		
Little Kalzas Lake					9.93	3.83								
Little Salmon Lake	33	21	1.6	0.99	63.21	24.41	885	2,904	92.6	304	155	509		
Little Teslin Lake	3.2	2.0	1.2	0.75	3.2	1.2	794	2,605			20	66		
Little Wolverine Lake														
Long Lake	1.3	0.81			0.34	0.13	665	2,182			15	49		
Louise Lake (Jackson Lake)					0.58	0.22	1,020	3,350	6.8	22	13	43		
Lower Snafu Lake	9.5	5.9	0.8	0.50	2.84	1.10	759	2,490	6.3	21	25	82		
Lucky Lake					0.04	0.015	670	2,200					Features the only outdoor waterslide north of 60° latitude.	
Mandanna Lake	6	3.7	4.5	2.8	8.5	3.3	781	2,562	21	69	64	210	Sinclair (2021) gives the area as 786 ha (7.86 km^{2}; 3.03 sq mi)	
Margaret Lake	5	3.1	1.5	0.93	4.5	1.7	490	1,610			26	85		
Marsh Lake	40	25	4	2.5	95.54	36.89	660	2,170	12.8	42	51.5	169		
Marshall Lake	1.8	1.1	0.5	0.31	0.44	0.17	1,430	4,690			2.1	6.9		
Mayo Lake	35.4	22.0	3.2	2.0	99.63	38.47	583	1,913	56.5	185	106	348		
McClinktock	2.8	1.7	1.3	0.81	1.8	0.69	790–825	2,592–2,707			22.0	72.2		
McEvoy Lake					19.04	7.35								
McLean Lake					0.026	0.010					7	23		
McPherson Lake					9.27	3.58								
McQuesten Lake	19	12	3	1.9	12.30	4.75	760	2,490			8	26	Elevation given is a maximum figure	
Michie Lake	4	2.5	1.5	0.93	3.71	1.43	795	2,608	15	49	50	160		
Minto Lake	3.7	2.3	1.3	0.81	4.20	1.62	761	2,497	13.8	45	37	121		
Moose Lake					13.85	5.35								
Moose Ponds													Almost entirely in the Northwest Territories.	
Moraine Lake	7	4.3			4.2	1.6	910–1,070	2,990–3,510			32	105		
Morley Lake					11.14	4.30	814	2,671	8.07	26.5	30	98		
Morris														
Nares Lake	4.5	2.8	2.6	1.6	107.15	41.37	1,000	3,300			15	49		
North Fork Lake	0.9	0.56	0.8	0.50	0.16	0.062	1,067–1,220	3,501–4,003			3.6	12		
North Lakes														
Palmer Lake	1.6	0.99	0.8	0.50	1.0	0.39	670–760	2,200–2,490			13.7	45		
Partridge Lake	6	3.7	0.8	0.50									Also partly in British Columbia	
Pelly Lake					19.80	7.64								
Pickhandle Lake					1.63	0.63								
Pine Lake	5.5	3.4	0.8	0.50	6.03	2.33	625	2,051	14.7	48	28	92		
Pine Lake 1					0.20	0.077	995	3,264	4.6	15	10	33		
Pine Lake 2					5.85	2.26	650	2,130	11.8	39	26	85		
Pinguicula Lake	3.2	2.0	0.5	0.31	1.13	0.44	914	2,999			12.2	40		
Pleasant														
Pocket Lake					0.063	0.024	610	2,000			16.7	55	Formerly called Moose Lake	
Poisson Lake														
Polecat Lake					1.68	0.65								
Popcornfish Lake	2.2	1.4	0.2	0.12	0.56	0.22	750	2,460			12.2	40		
Pygmy Lake					0.5	0.19					18	59		
Quiet Lake	28	17	3.2	2.0	54.41	21.01	787	2,582	56.8	186	170	560	Headwaters of the Big Salmon River. Some sources give the length as 12 km (7.5 mi), the area as 3,780 ha (37.8 km^{2}; 14.6 sq mi) and the average depth as 32.9 m (108 ft), but this conflicts with map evidence.	
Rainbow Lake					1.44	0.56	610–735	2,001–2,411			2	6.6		
Rantin Lake					0.07	0.027	723	2,372			12	39		
Reid Lake	5.6	3.5	3.5	2.2	14.8	5.7	460–610	1,510–2,000			15.5	51		
Salmo Lake					0.03	0.012	796	2,612			8	26		
Sambo Lake					11.36	4.39								
Sandy														
Schwatka Lake					0.15	0.058					6–8	20–26	Reservoir created in the 1950s by the Whitehorse Dam on the Yukon River	
Scout Lake					0.23	0.089	877	2,877			22	72		
Sekulmun Lake	30	19			49.32	19.04	921	3,022	28	92	53	174		
Simpson Lake	11	6.8	2	1.2	21.80	8.42	694	2,277	38	125	58	190		
Smart Lake	1.3	0.81			1.4	0.54	760–910	2,490–2,990			6	20		
Snafu Lakes — see Upper Snafu Lake and Lower Snafu Lake														N/A
Sockeye Lake					0.728	0.281			17.3	57	27.4	90		
Spirit Lake														
Squanga Lake	8.5	5.3	1.2	0.75	10.20	3.94	790	2,590	40	130	46	151		
Stevens Lake					7.09	2.74								
Stewart Lake					10.41	4.02								
Stokes Lake					13.90	5.37								
Sulphur	2.8	1.7	0.6	0.37	1.50	0.58	760–910	2,490–2,990			2	6.6		
Summit Lake	3.2	2.0	0.5	0.31	1.60	0.62	838	2,749			13	43		
Swan Lake	7	4.3	1.4	0.87	8.9	3.4	841	2,759			65	213		
Ta'tla Mun (Tatlmain Lake)	20	12	1.0	0.62	31.41	12.13	525	1,722	27	89	48	157		
Tadru Lake					13.60	5.25								
Tagish Lake	119	74	3	1.9	354.48	136.87	662	2,172	62	203	307	1,007	About two-thirds of the area is in British Columbia, figure for width is the mean average	
Tarfu Lake	4.5	2.8	1.6	0.99	4.04	1.56	773	2,536	11.6	38	33	108		
Tatchun Lake	10.5	6.5	1.0	0.62	6.86	2.65	460–610	1,510–2,000			53	174		
Tay Lake					9.50	3.67							East of Faro, Yukon. Not to be confused with Taye Lake.	
Taye Lake	6.4	4.0	1.6	0.99	9.77	3.77	610–760	2,000–2,490	2.5	8.2	3	9.8	North of Champagne Landing. Not to be confused with Tay Lake.	
Tchawsahmon Lake					7.13	2.75							Sometimes misspelled "Tchawshamon"	
Teenah Lake	3.9	2.4	0.8–2.4	0.50–1.49	2.40	0.93	855–885	2,805–2,904			19.2	63		
Ten Mile Lake					3.26	1.26	808	2,651	23	75	48	157		
Teslin Lake	108	67	3.0	1.9	354.00	136.68	684	2,244	59	194	214	702	Also partly in British Columbia	
Thirty-Seven Mile Lake	0.5	0.31	0.8	0.50	3.50	1.35								
Tillei Lake					20.04	7.74								
Tincup Lake					17.90	6.91								
Toobally Lake - Lower					10.80	4.17	623	2,044	16.7	55	60	200		
Toobally Lake - Upper					11.70	4.52	623	2,044	22.8	75	118	387		
Ts'oogot Gaay Lake														
Twin Lakes – East					0.61	0.24	630	2,070	14.6	48	34.0	111.5		
Twin Lakes – West	2.3	1.4	1.8	1.1	1.53	0.59	630	2,070	16.1	53	43.0	141.1	Dimensions given by Lindsey interpreted as related to Twin Lake west based on area and depth given by Sinclair.	
Two Moose Lake					0.12	0.046	1,077	3,533	5	16				
Upper Snafu Lake					3.43	1.32			14.7	48				
Veronica Lake					0.14	0.054	861	2,825						
Von Wilczek Lake – North	2.4	1.5	1.6	0.99	3.2	1.2	460–610	1,510–2,000			3.7	12		
Von Wilczek Lake – South					2.5	0.97	460–610	1,510–2,000						
Watson Lake	8	5.0	2.9	1.8	13.44	5.19	677	2,221	12	39	36	118		
Wellesley Lake	13.5	8.4	6.5	4.0	73.81	28.50			23.8	78	47.0	154.2		
Wheeler Lake					2.8	1.1	610–760	2,000–2,490			30.0	98.4		
Whiskers Lake					0.73	0.28	783	2,569			30	98		
Whitefish					14	5.4								
Willow Lake	3.5	2.2	0.8	0.50	1.9	0.73	760–910	2,490–2,990			1.8	5.9		
Wolf Lake	22	14	6	3.7	74.4	28.7	991	3,251			66	217		
Wolverine Lake					7.64	2.95	1,115	3,658	21.2	70	73	240		
Wrong Lake					0.08	0.031	742	2,434			6	20		
Second Wye Lake					0.30	0.12	689	2,260	3.5	11	28	92	Located in Wye Lake Park in the town of Watson Lake.	
Wye Lake					0.19	0.073	692	2,270	2.7	8.9	5.6	18	Located in Wye Lake Park in the town of Watson Lake.	
