= Caribou Creek (disambiguation) =

Caribou Creek is a river in Saskatchewan, Canada.

Caribou Creek may also refer to:

- Caribou Creek, a creek near Burton, British Columbia
- Caribou Creek, a tributary to the Liard River
- Caribou Creek, a tributary to the Matanuska River
- Caribou Creek, a tributary to the Winnipeg River
- Caribou Creek, a tributary to the Wolf River, Yukon
- Caribou Creek, a mostly dry creek near Whispering Forest, California
- Caribou Creek, a historic name for Abandon Creek
- Caribou Creek, a stream carrying water from Sophist Mountain into Kinbasket Lake
  - Caribou Creek Recreation site, a gravel boat launch at Kinbasket Lake, British Columbia
- Caribou Creek Lodge, a motel on the southern shore of Upper Fishing Lake in the Narrow Hills Provincial Park
- Caribou Creek recreational gold mining area, one of several such areas for Gold mining in Alaska § Recreational gold mining in Alaska
