= Independence Historic District =

Independence Historic District may refer to:

- Independence Historic District (Evansville, Indiana), listed on the NRHP in Indiana
- Independence Downtown Historic District, Independence, KS, listed on the NRHP in Kansas
- Independence Historic District (Independence, Louisiana), listed on the NRHP in Louisiana
- Independence Historic District (Independence, Oregon), listed on the NRHP in Oregon
- Independence Heights Residential Historic District, Houston, TX, listed on the NRHP in Texas
