= Hico =

Hico may stand for:

- Hico, Kentucky
- Hico, Missouri
- Hico, Texas
- Hico, West Virginia
- HiCo stands for high-coercivity, a variety of magnetic stripe.
- The Hyperspectral Imager for the Coastal Ocean (HICO), a satellite sensor mounted on the International Space Station 2009-2014.
- Gyeongju Hwabaek International Convention Center
