= 1936 Cordele–Greensboro tornado outbreak =

Weather event in the United States

1936 Cordele-Greensboro tornado outbreak
Meteorological history
- Duration: April 1–2, 1936

Tornado outbreak
- Tornadoes: ≥ 13
- Max. rating: F4 tornado
- Duration: ~14 hours

Overall effects
- Fatalities: 49 confirmed
- Injuries: Unknown
- Damage: Unknown
- Areas affected: Southeastern United States

The 1936 Cordele–Greensboro tornado outbreak was a tornado outbreak that affected the Southeastern United States during April 1936. The Greensboro, North Carolina, and Cordele, Georgia, tornadoes were the deadliest spawned during the April 1–2 outbreak, which developed in three waves of tornadic activity over 14 hours, associated with the same storm system.

On the evening of April 2, 1936, the Greensboro tornado left a long path of F4 damage across the south side of Greensboro, passing through the south side of downtown. The storm began its path near High Point Road at Elam Street and continued east along Lee Street to east of Bennett College. This storm left $2 million in damage in Greensboro (1936 USD). It was responsible for 14 deaths and 144 injuries, standing as the second-deadliest tornado in the history of North Carolina after a February 1884 tornado that caused 23 deaths along a path from Rockingham to Lillington.

Later in the week, a second outbreak would spawn devastating tornadoes in Waynesboro, Tennessee, Tupelo, Mississippi, and Gainesville, Georgia.

== Tornado table ==
Confirmed tornadoes by Fujita rating
FU	F0	F1	F2	F3	F4	F5	Total
≥5	?	?	5	0	3	0	≥ 13

=== April 1 ===
April 1, 1936
F#	Location	County	Time (UTC)	Path length	Comments/Damage
Georgia
F?	Athens	Clarke	0100	unknown	Damage in one neighborhood, with a church destroyed.
F4	Tignall to Lincolnton	Wilkes, Lincoln	0130	20 miles (32 km)	5 deaths — A tornado killed five people as it destroyed 10 homes and damaged 30 in Tignall. The courthouse and 50 homes were damaged in Lincolnton and nearby farms also reported damage. Cattle were killed and five barns and a store wrecked. The section of the path in Lincolnton, which was widest and weakest, may have been another tornado by a separate thunderstorm.
Alabama
F2	N of Gordo	Pickens	0500	4 miles (6.4 km)	1 death — Five homes were destroyed and one woman killed in the small community of Hannah's Church, 7 miles (11 km) to the north of Gordo.

=== April 2 ===
April 2, 1936
F#	Location	County	Time (UTC)	Path length	Comments/Damage
Georgia
F2	Sasser area	Terrell	1130	5 miles (8.0 km)	1 death — Tenant homes were destroyed southwest and northeast of Sasser. The tornado unroofed large homes and threw about debris as it hit downtown Sasser. This tornado and the subsequent Leesburg and Cordele tornadoes were produced by the same supercell.
F?	Dawson area	Terrell	1145		1 death — Tornado reported at Dawson.
F2	N of Leesburg	Lee, Sumter	1200	15 miles (24 km)	1 death — Six homes were destroyed as the tornado passed 2 miles (3.2 km) north of Neyami and into Sumter County. Losses reached $4,300.
F4	Cordele area	Crisp	1230	15 miles (24 km)	23 deaths — A large and violent tornado developed 7 miles (11 km) southwest of Cordele and moved into the business district. It destroyed 276 homes and damaged 165, causing ~$3 million in damage in the town. At least 11 other buildings were also damaged. "Many of the finest houses were torn to splinters..."
South Carolina
F2	Lodge	Colleton	1330	1 mile (1.6 km)	1 death — Brief tornado touchdown destroyed a farm in Lodge, between Barnwell and Walterboro.
F?	Hampton	Hampton	unknown		1 death
North Carolina
F?	Concord	Mecklenburg, Cabarrus	2230		Businesses and homes heavily damaged (with at least one building destroyed) near downtown Concord.
F4	Greensboro area	Guilford	0012	11 miles (18 km)	14 deaths — A tornado produced F4 damage through the southern part of downtown Greensboro. 56 buildings were completely destroyed, with 233 more damaged. ~$2 million in damage.
F2	N of Mebane	Alamance, Orange	0040	3 miles (4.8 km)	1 death — Passed 1 mile (1.6 km) north of Mebane. Three small homes were destroyed and five people were injured. The tornado may have also caused "slight" damage 3 miles (4.8 km) to the north of Hillsborough. The parent supercell also produced the Warren County tornado.
F?	SE of Warrenton	Warren	0215		An eyewitness in the Warren County community of Arcola noted that "a heavy cloud and a loud roar passed north of me at 9:15 P.M."

== See also ==
- 1936 Tupelo–Gainesville tornado outbreak – An even deadlier outbreak that occurred just days after this one
- List of North American tornadoes and tornado outbreaks
- List of tornadoes striking downtown areas
