= Swenoda =

Swenoda may refer to:

- Swenoda Lake, a lake in Pope County, Minnesota
- Swenoda Township, Swift County, Minnesota
