= Tarfu =

Tarfu or TARFU may refer to:

- Tarfu Lake, a lake of Yukon, Canada
- TARFU, an acronym for "Totally and Royally Fucked Up" or "Things Are Really Fucked Up"; see Military slang
- Seaman Tarfu, a brother of cartoon character Private Snafu
