= Saint Patrick's Roman Catholic Church (Independence, Oregon) =

Historic church in Oregon, United States

- U.S. National Register of Historic Places
- U.S. Historic district – Contributing property
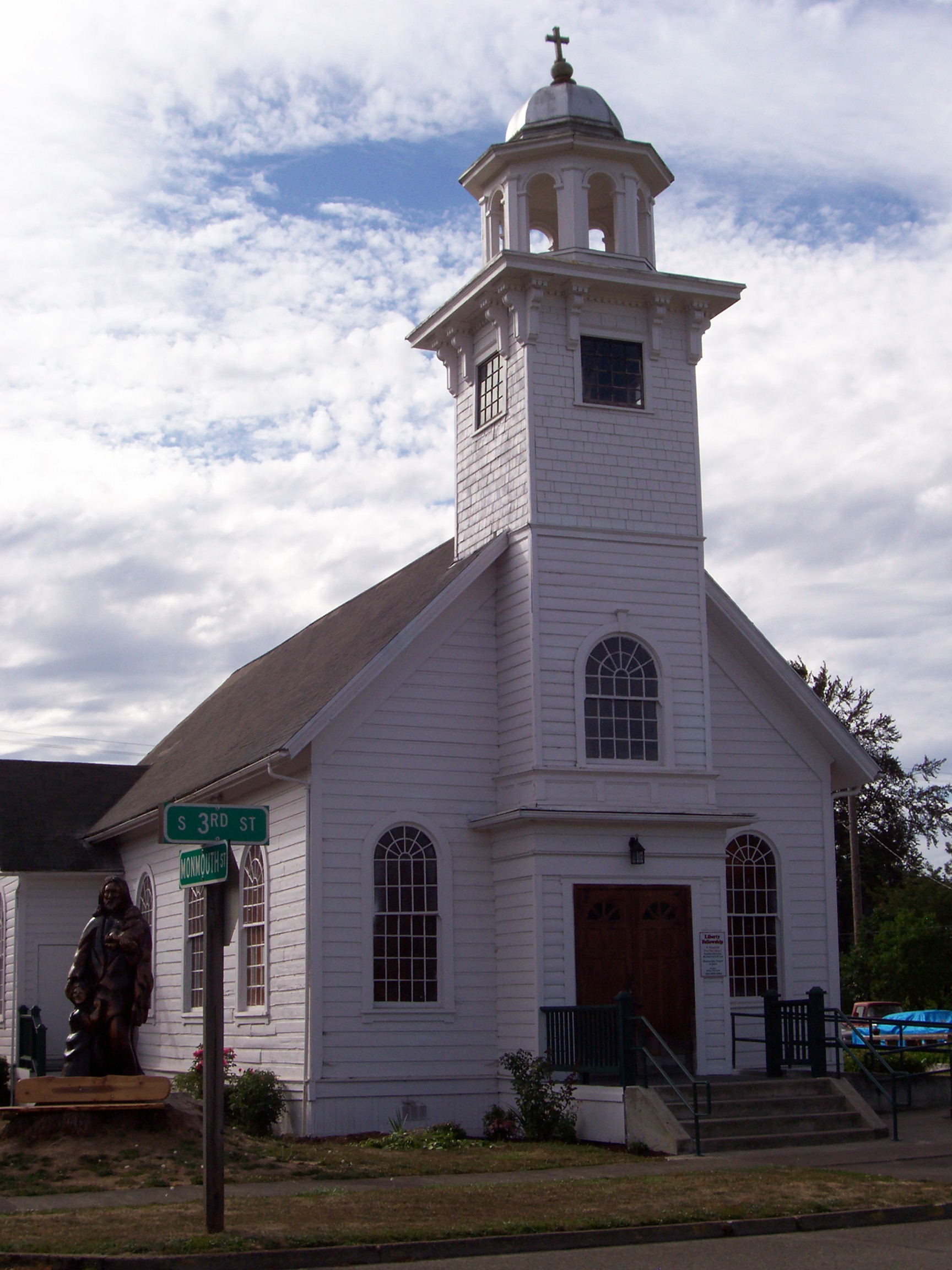

- Location within Oregon Location within the United States
- Location: 330 Monmouth St., Independence, Oregon
- Coordinates: 44°51′05″N 123°11′16″W
- Area: less than one acre
- Built: 1874
- Part of: Independence Historic District (ID89000048)
- NRHP reference No.: 87000040
- Added to NRHP: February 5, 1987

Saint Patrick's Roman Catholic Church (also known as Methodist Episcopal Church, South) is a historic church building at 330 Monmouth Street in Independence, Oregon.

It was built in 1874 and added to the National Register in 1987.

== See also ==
- National Register of Historic Places listings in Polk County, Oregon
- Independence Historic District
