= Quiet Lake (Yukon) =

Lake in Yukon, Canada

- Location within Canada
- Location: Yukon
- Coordinates: 61°5′37″N 133°4′32.9″W
- Basin countries: Canada
- Surface area: 5,391.3 ha (13,322 acres)

Quiet Lake is a lake in Yukon, Canada that is 28 kilometres (17 mi) in length and at 5,391.3 hectares (13,322 acres) the largest lake of the three Big Salmon River system lakes. It was named in 1887 by John McCormack, a gold prospector. Prior to the construction of the South Canol road, which was completed in the 1940s, the area was mostly reached by boating hundreds of miles up the Big Salmon, Teslin or Nisutlin rivers.

== See also ==
- List of lakes in Yukon
