= North Fork Siuslaw River =

River in Oregon, the United States of America

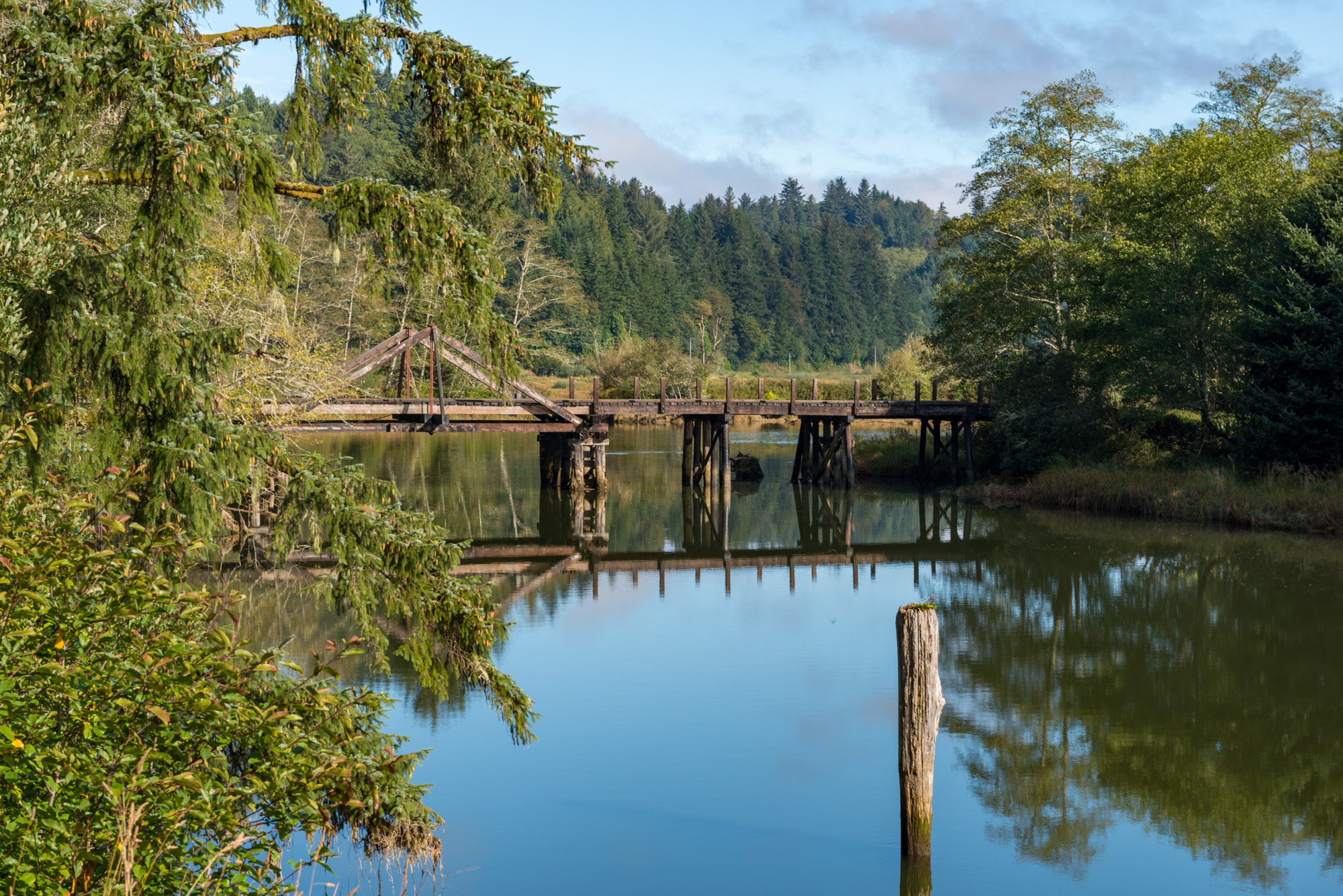
- A bridge over the North Fork Siuslaw River near Florence.

- Location of the mouth of the North Fork Siuslaw River in Oregon
- Etymology: From a Yakonan name for a locality, tribe or chief

Location
- Country: United States
- State: Oregon
- County: Lane

Physical characteristics
- Source: Confluence of Sam Creek and West Branch Sam Creek
  - location: Pawn, a former community and post office, Siuslaw National Forest
  - coordinates: 44°09′14″N 123°57′01″W
  - elevation: 419 ft (128 m)
- Mouth: Siuslaw River
  - location: near Florence, Oregon
  - coordinates: 43°58′35″N 124°04′51″W
  - elevation: 0 ft (0 m)
- Length: 27 mi (43 km)
- Basin size: 64 sq mi (170 km^{2})

The North Fork Siuslaw River is a tributary of the Siuslaw River in Lane County in the United States state of Oregon. It is formed by the confluence of Sam Creek and West Branch in the Siuslaw National Forest of the Central Oregon Coast Range. The former community of Pawn was once at the juncture of the two creeks. From here, the river flows about 2 miles (3 km) southeast, then about 25 miles (40 km) southwest to meet the main stem 1.2 miles (1.9 km) east of Florence.

== Recreation ==
The United States Forest Service maintains the North Fork Siuslaw Campground along the river north of Minerva. Generally open from May 1 to December 1, it has seven dispersed campsites and a vault toilet but no drinking water.

The river, which supports populations of Chinook salmon, cutthroat trout, and steelhead, is open to fishing from boats downstream of Minerva and from the bank further upstream. Wild steelhead fishing is limited to catch and release. Bender Landing County Park, off North Fork Road near Florence, has a boat ramp, picnic tables, toilets, and access to fishing.

== Tributaries ==
Sam Creek and West Branch form the river. Downstream of this from source to mouth, tributaries enter as follows: Cedar, Taylor, and Deadman creeks, all from the left; Porter, Wilhelm, and Drew creeks, right; Cataract, McLeod, and South Johns creeks, left; Stout Canyon, right, and Stout Creek, left.

Then Shumard Creek, left; Russell Creek, right; South Russell Creek, left; Jim Dick, Condon, and Culver creeks, right; Bellstrom Canyon, left, and Morris, Haring, Slover, and Lindsley creeks, right.

== See also ==
- List of rivers of Oregon
