= Mayo Lake (Yukon) =

Lake in Canada

- Location within Yukon
- Location: Yukon
- Coordinates: 63°45′46.7″N 135°2′47″W
- Basin countries: Canada
- Surface area: 95 km^{2} (37 sq mi)

Mayo Lake is a lake of Yukon, Canada with an area of about 95 square kilometres (37 sq mi).

== See also ==
- List of lakes in Yukon
