= Pawn, Oregon =

Unincorporated community in the state of Oregon, United States

- Unincorporated community
- Location within Oregon Location within the United States
- Coordinates: 44°09′12″N 123°56′55″W
- Country: United States
- State: Oregon
- County: Lane
- Elevation: 423 ft (129 m)
- Time zone: UTC-8 (Pacific (PST))
  - Summer (DST): UTC-7 (PDT)
- Coordinates and elevation from United States Geological Survey

Pawn was a historic unincorporated community in Lane County in the U.S. state of Oregon. It lay at the headwaters of the North Fork Siuslaw River, where Sam Creek and West Branch join to form the river in the Siuslaw National Forest of the Central Oregon Coast Range. Downstream is the unincorporated community of Minerva, and further downstream, near the mouth of the river on the Siuslaw River is the city of Florence.

Pawn had a post office from 1915 to 1933. Four area residents combined the first letters of their last names—Poole, Ackerley, Worthington, and Nolen—to manufacture the post office name. One of them, Monroe Poole, was the first postmaster. Mail reached Pawn by horse or wagon, sometimes transferred from a boat further downstream.

Before roads connected Pawn to Florence, the community had its own school for children in grades 1 through 8. Older children boarded in Florence, where they went to high school.

A 21st-century forest trail in the same general vicinity is named after the community. Pawn Trail, managed by the United States Forest Service, forms a 4,000-foot (1,200 m) loop through an old-growth forest. The trail, open all year, is about 18 miles (29 km) from Florence, mostly via forest roads.
