= Rural Municipality of Lake of the Rivers No. 72 =

Rural municipality in Saskatchewan, Canada

Lake of the Rivers No. 72
- Rural municipality
- Rural Municipality of Lake of the Rivers No. 72
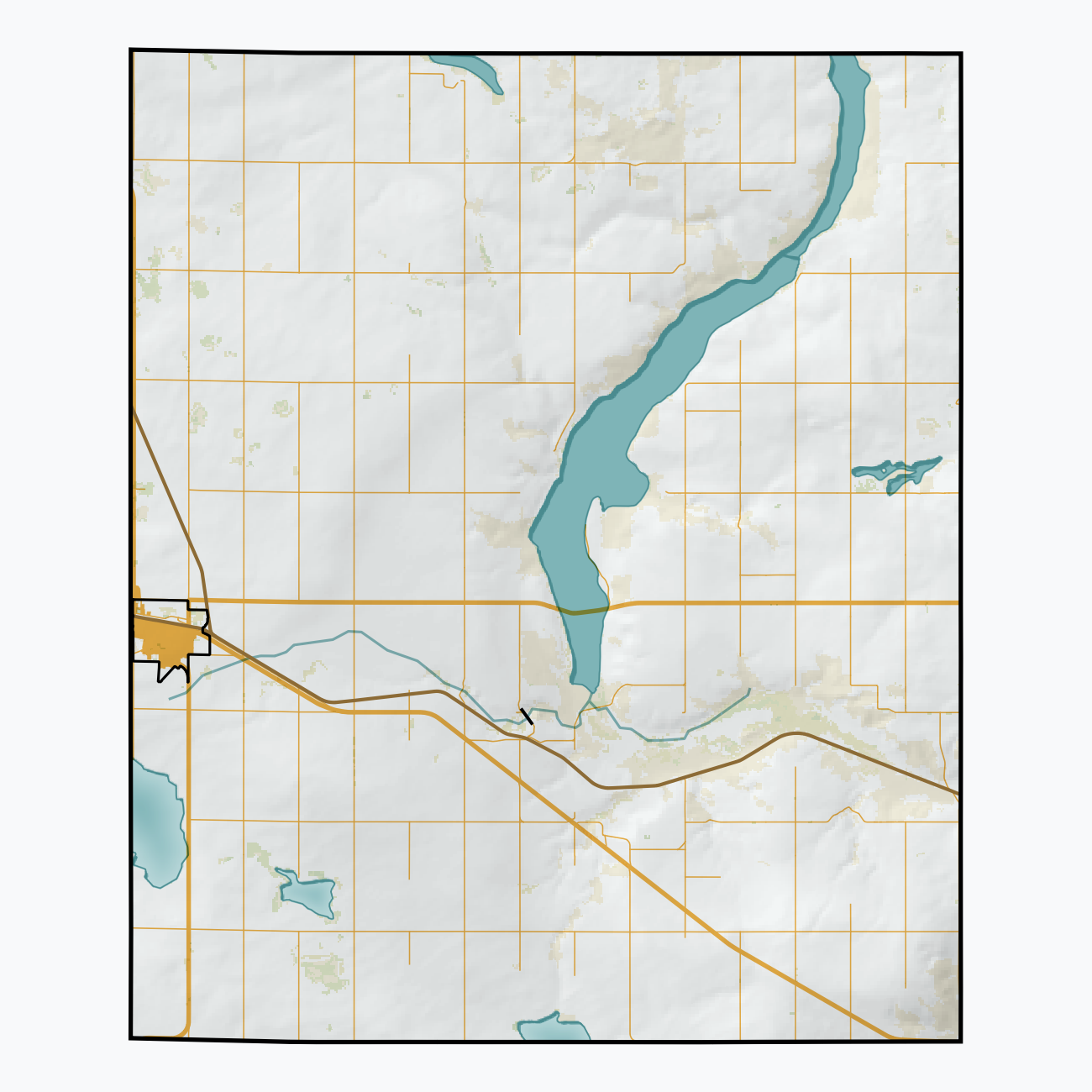

- Location of the RM of Lake of the Rivers No. 72 in Saskatchewan
- Coordinates: 49.622°N 105.928°W
- Country: Canada
- Province: Saskatchewan
- Census division: 3
- SARM division: 2
- Federal riding: Cypress Hills—Grasslands
- Provincial riding: Wood River
- Formed: December 11, 1911

Government
  - Reeve: Norm Nordgulen
  - Governing body: RM of Lake of the Rivers No. 72 Council
  - Administrator: Shanese Mielke
  - Office location: Assiniboia

Area (2016)
  - Land: 677.5 km^{2} (261.6 sq mi)

Population (2016)
  - Total: 279
  - Density: 0.4/km^{2} (1.0/sq mi)
- Time zone: CST
  - Summer (DST): CST
- Postal code: S0H 0B0
- Area codes: 306 and 639

The Rural Municipality of Lake of the Rivers No. 72 (2016 population: 279) is a rural municipality (RM) in the Canadian province of Saskatchewan within Census Division No. 3 and SARM Division No. 2. It is located in the southwest portion of the province.

== History ==
The RM of Lake Of The Rivers No. 72 incorporated as a rural municipality on December 11, 1911.

== Geography ==
=== Communities and localities ===
The following urban municipalities are surrounded by the RM.

Towns

- Assiniboia

The following unincorporated communities are within the RM.

Localities

- Davyroyd
- Willows, dissolved as a village, January 1, 1950

== Demographics ==
Population history (1981–2016)
Year	Pop.	±%
1981	506	—
1986	495	−2.2%
1991	413	−16.6%
1996	423	+2.4%
2001	376	−11.1%
2006	326	−13.3%
2011	302	−7.4%
2016	279	−7.6%
Source: Statistics Canada via Saskatchewan Bureau of Statistics

In the 2021 Census of Population conducted by Statistics Canada, the RM of Lake of the Rivers No. 72 had a population of 252 living in 101 of its 107 total private dwellings, a change of −9.7% from its 2016 population of 279. With a land area of 665.26 km^{2} (256.86 sq mi), it had a population density of 0.4/km^{2} (1.0/sq mi) in 2021.

In the 2016 Census of Population, the RM of Lake of the Rivers No. 72 recorded a population of 279 living in 111 of its 121 total private dwellings, a −7.6% change from its 2011 population of 302. With a land area of 677.5 km^{2} (261.6 sq mi), it had a population density of 0.4/km^{2} (1.1/sq mi) in 2016.

== Government ==
The RM of Lake of the Rivers No. 72 is governed by an elected municipal council and an appointed administrator that meets on the second Friday of every month. The reeve of the RM is Norm Nordgulen while its administrator is Shanese Mielke. The RM's office is located in Assiniboia.

== Transportation ==
The Assiniboia Airport is located in the rural municipality.

== See also ==
- List of rural municipalities in Saskatchewan
- Rural municipality (Canada)
