= Molanosa =

Northern community in Saskatchewan, Canada

Coordinates: 54°30′00″N 105°33′02″W

Molanosa (Cree: ᑮᐢᑲᐦᐃᑲᓂᓯᕽ, kîskahikanisihk) is a small isolated community located in Northern Saskatchewan, approximately 70 kilometres (43 mi) south of La Ronge near the northern end of Montreal Lake. It is considered the geographic centre of Saskatchewan. Access is from Highway 969.

The name is an acronym for Montreal Lake, Northern Saskatchewan.

== See also ==
- List of communities in Saskatchewan
- List of geographic acronyms and initialisms
