= Spirit Lake (Yukon) =

Lake in the Yukon, Canada

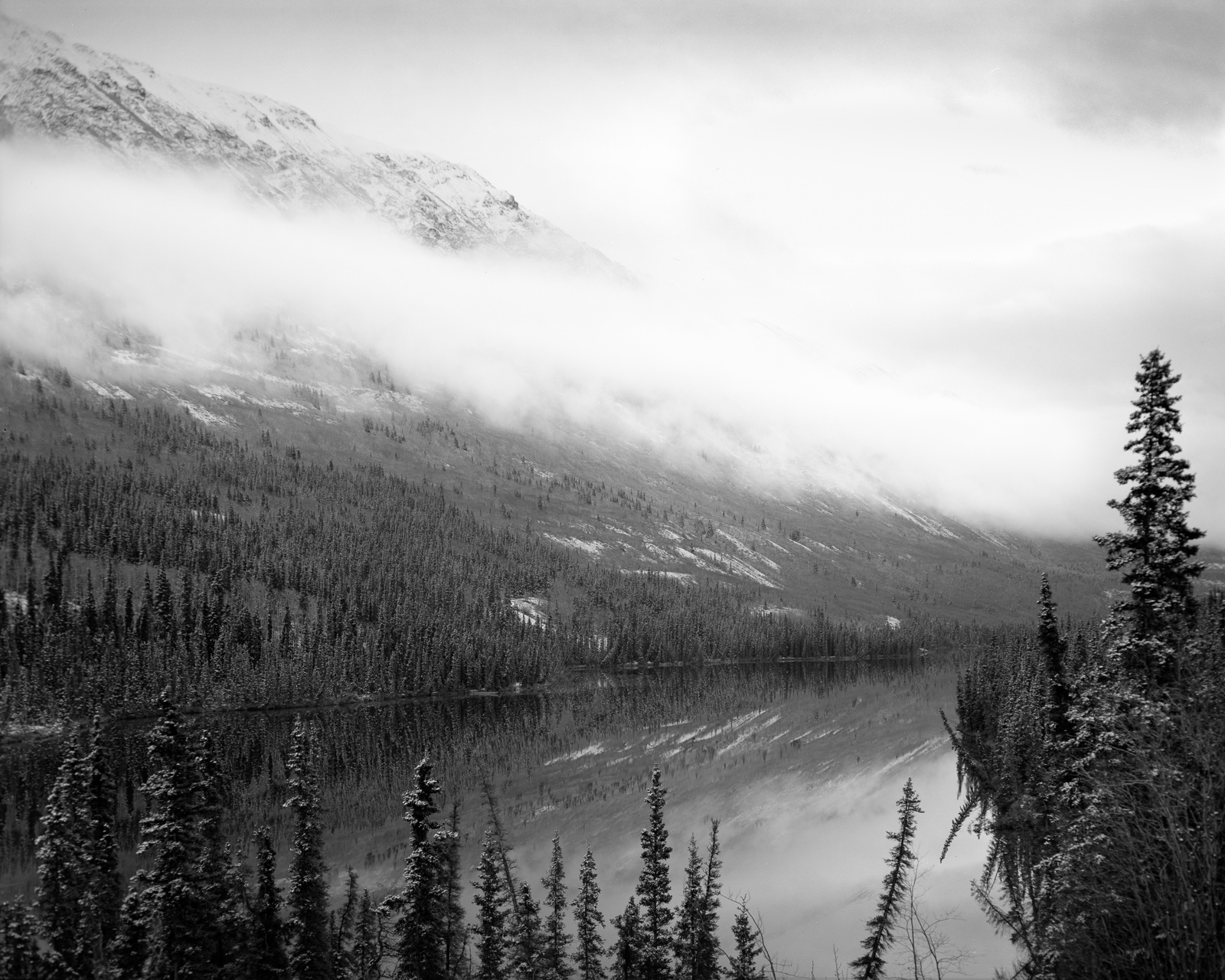
- Spirit Lake near Carcross, Yukon.

- Location within Yukon
- Location: Yukon
- Coordinates: 60.2480°N 134.7384°W
- Basin countries: Canada

Spirit Lake (Tlingit: Dal’eiyí Áukú) is a lake in the southern Yukon about 70 km (43 mi) south of Whitehorse. The lake is situated just off the Klondike Highway. The lake has emerald green colours. The distinct crater-like holes on the lake bottom were shaped by glaciers which retreated thousands of years ago.

== See also ==
- List of lakes of Yukon
