= Willows, Saskatchewan =

Human settlement in Saskatchewan, Canada

Coordinates: 49.603°N 105.846°W

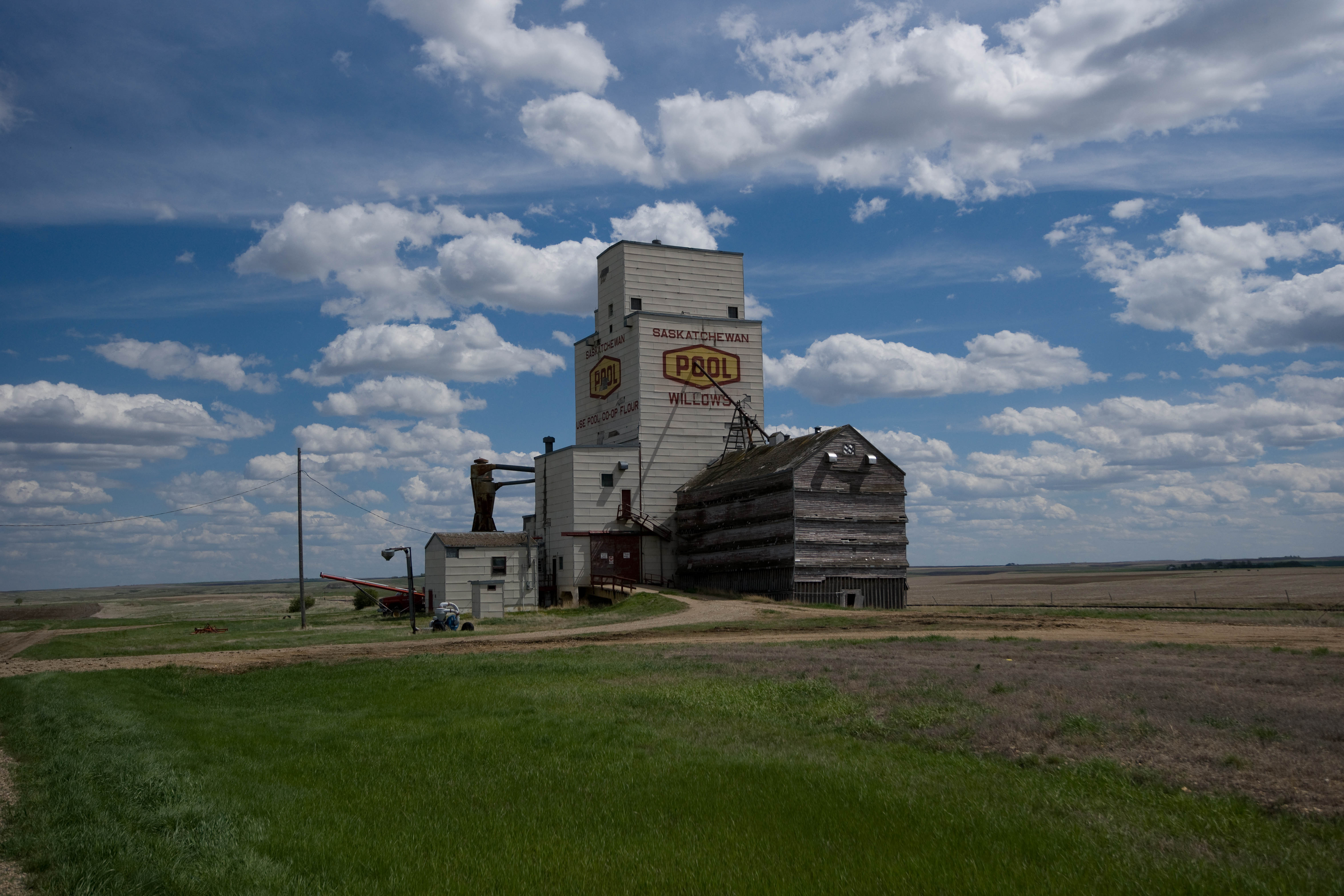
Elevator at Willows

Willows is an unincorporated community in Lake of the Rivers Rural Municipality No. 72, Saskatchewan, Canada. It previously held the status of a village until January 1, 1950. The name is a contraction of William Gibson Lowes, owner of the first store.

== Demographics ==
Prior to January 1, 1950, Willows was incorporated as a village, and was restructured as an unincorporated community under the jurisdiction of the Rural municipality of Lake of The Rivers on that date.

== See also ==
- List of communities in Saskatchewan
- List of geographic acronyms and initialisms
