= Independence Historic District (Evansville, Indiana) =

Historic district in Indiana, United States

- U.S. National Register of Historic Places
- U.S. Historic district
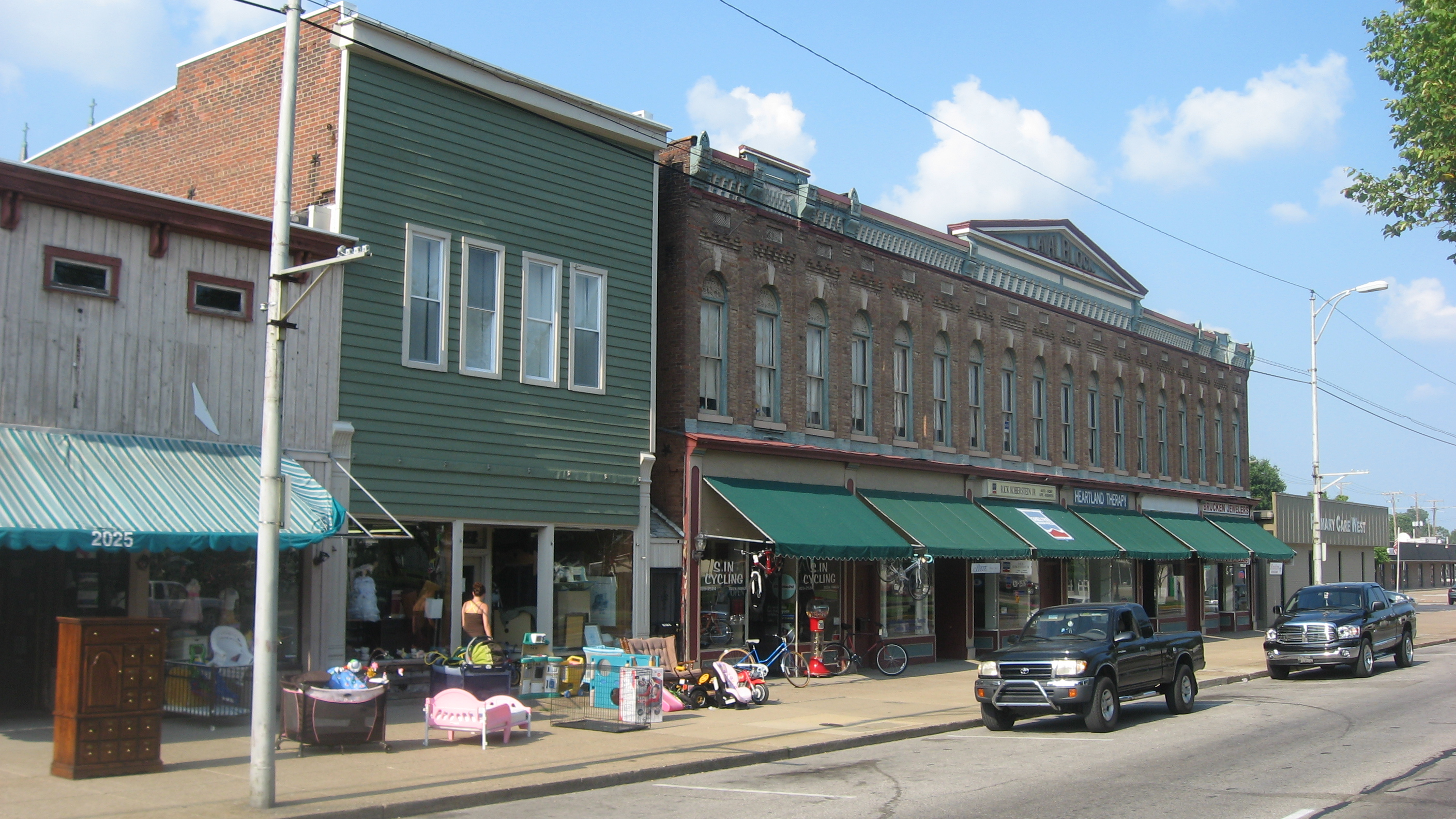
- Independence Historic District, July 2011

- Location within Indiana Location within the United States
- Location: W. Franklin St. and Wabash Ave., Evansville, Indiana
- Coordinates: 37°57′51″N 87°33′27″W
- Area: 33 acres (13 ha)
- Built: 1880
- Architectural style: Italianate, Romanesque, Beaux Arts
- NRHP reference No.: 82000102
- Added to NRHP: February 1, 1982

Independence Historic District, also known as the West Franklin Street-Wabash Avenue Historic District, is a national historic district located in the Lamasco neighborhood of Evansville, Indiana. The district developed after 1880, and encompasses 95 contributing buildings and one contributing site. It includes commercial and residential properties and representative examples of Italianate, Queen Anne, Romanesque, and Beaux-Arts style architecture. Notable buildings include the West Branch Carnegie Library (1912), Laval Block, Heldt-Voelker Hardware Store (1890), First Federal Savings, Gerke Building, August Rosenberger House (1894), and St. Boniface Church (1882, 1902).

It was listed on the National Register of Historic Places in 1982.
