= Kragon, Kentucky =

Unincorporated community in Kentucky, United States

Kragon
- Unincorporated community
- Location within the state of Kentucky Kragon (the United States)
- Coordinates: 37°30′24″N 83°20′40″W
- Country: United States
- State: Kentucky
- County: Breathitt
- Elevation: 837 ft (255 m)
- Time zone: UTC-6 (Central (CST))
  - Summer (DST): UTC-5 (CST)
- GNIS feature ID: 508409

Kragon is an unincorporated community in Breathitt County, Kentucky, United States.

The town was named after K. Ragon, who established a factory there in 1913.
