= Tarfu Lake =

Lake in Yukon, Canada

- Location within Yukon
- Location: Yukon
- Coordinates: 60°3′29.4″N 133°43′58.2″W
- Primary inflows: Tarfu Creek
- Primary outflows: Tarfu Creek
- Basin countries: Canada
- Max. length: 4.5 km (2.8 mi)
- Max. width: 1.21 km (0.75 mi)
- Surface area: 404 ha (1,000 acres)
- Average depth: 11.6 m (38 ft)
- Max. depth: 33 m (108 ft)

Tarfu Lake is a lake of Yukon, Canada. The lake is both fed and drained by Tarfu Creek. The name is from WWII-era Military slang, an acronym for either Things Are Really Fouled Up or Things Are Really Fucked Up. The lake is approximately 4.5 kilometres (2.8 mi) long, 1.21 km (0.75 mi) wide, has a surface area of 404 hectares (1,000 acres), a mean depth of 11.6 metres (38 ft) and a maximum depth of 33 metres (108 ft).

== See also ==
- Snafu Lakes, a chain of lakes in southern Yukon
- List of lakes in Yukon
