= Sophist Mountain =

Mountain in British Columbia, Canada

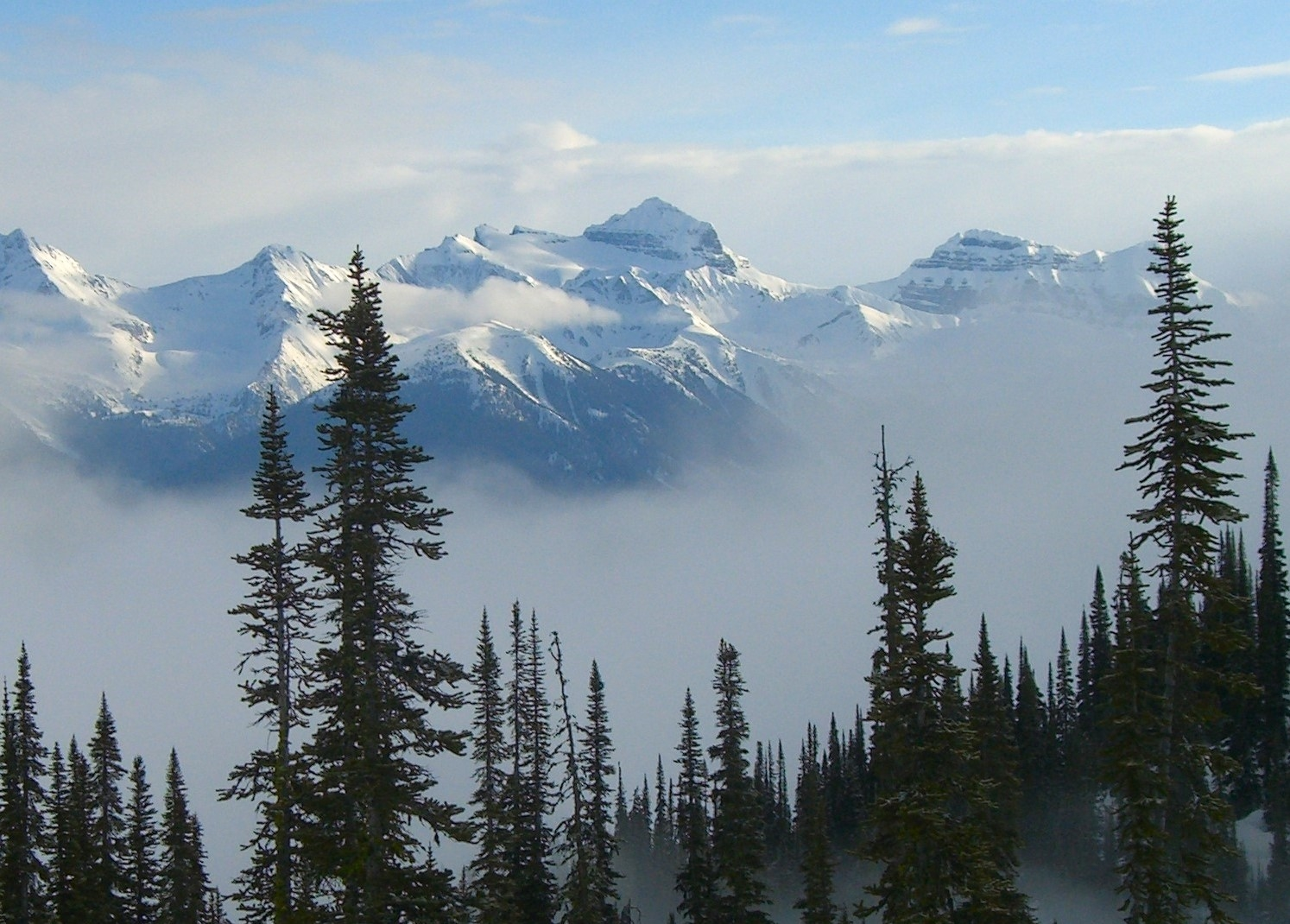
- Southwest aspect, centered on skyline

Highest point
- Elevation: 3,001 m (9,846 ft)
- Prominence: 851 m (2,792 ft)
- Parent peak: Mount Columbia (3,747 m)
- Isolation: 15.06 km (9.36 mi)
- Listing: Mountains of British Columbia
- Coordinates: 51°53′57″N 117°42′58″W

Naming
- Etymology: Sophist

Geography
- Location within British Columbia Location within Canada
- Country: Canada
- Province: British Columbia
- District: Kootenay Land District
- Parent range: Kitchen Range; Rocky Mountains
- Topo map: NTS 82N13 Sullivan River

Sophist Mountain is a 3,001-metre (9,846-foot) mountain in British Columbia, Canada.

== Description ==
Sophist Mountain is the highest point of the Kitchen Range which is a small subrange of the Rocky Mountains. It is located 85 km (53 mi) north of Golden along the east side of the Rocky Mountain Trench. Precipitation runoff and glacial meltwater from the mountain's north slope drains to Sullivan River, the west slope drains to Caribou Creek, the south slope to Game Creek, the east slope to Chatter Creek, and each flow into Kinbasket Lake which is a reservoir on the Columbia River. Topographic relief is significant as the summit rises 2,240 metres (7,350 ft) above the lake in 9 km (5.6 mi). The mountain's toponym was officially adopted on March 4, 1965, by the Geographical Names Board of Canada.

== Climate ==
Based on the Köppen climate classification, Sophist Mountain is located in a subarctic climate zone with cold, snowy winters, and mild summers. Winter temperatures can drop below −20 °C with wind chill factors below −30 °C. This climate supports unnamed glaciers on the north and west slopes of the peak.

== See also ==
- Geography of British Columbia
