= Kofa, Arizona =

Populated place in Yuma County, Arizona, US

- Populated place
- Location within the state of Arizona Kofa (the United States)
- Coordinates: 32°52′55″N 113°38′48″W
- Country: United States
- State: Arizona
- County: Yuma
- Elevation: 390 ft (119 m)
- Time zone: UTC-7 (Mountain (MST))
  - Summer (DST): UTC-7 (MST)
- Area code: 928
- FIPS code: 04-38390
- GNIS feature ID: 24482

Kofa, also historically known as Kofa Station, is a populated place situated in Yuma County, Arizona, United States. It is located in the northern San Cristobal Valley, along the Union Pacific Railroad's Roll Industrial Lead.

The town, like the nearby hills of the same name, was derived from the acronym for "King of Arizona", which had been coined by Colonel Eugene Ives. Ives had purchased a nearby mine from Charles Eichelberg for $250,000, which he named the King of Arizona Mine. A post office was established in the town in 1900, with Lewis W. Alexander as its postmaster. It has an estimated elevation of 390 feet (120 m) above sea level.
