= Wolf River (Yukon) =

- Native name: Ghùch Hîni (Tlingit)

Location
- Country: Canada
- Territory: Yukon

Physical characteristics
- Source: Wolf Lake
  - coordinates: 60°42′37″N 131°44′02″W
  - elevation: 988 m (3,241 ft)
- Mouth: Nisutlin River
  - coordinates: 60°16′34″N 132°33′10″W
  - elevation: 695 m (2,280 ft)

Basin features
- River system: Bering Sea drainage basin

The Wolf River (Tlingit: Ghùch Hîni) is a river in Yukon, Canada. It is in the Bering Sea drainage basin and is a left tributary of the Nisutlin River.

The river begins at a Wolf Lake, flows west and takes in its right tributary the Red River, then turns southwest and heads to its mouth at the Nisutlin River. The Nisutlin River empties via Teslin Lake, the Teslin River and the Yukon River to the Bering Sea.

== Tributaries ==
- Caribou Creek (left)
- English Creek (left)
- Red River (right)

== See also ==
- List of rivers of Yukon
