= Raeco, Washington =

Unincorporated community in Washington, US

- Unincorporated community
- Location in Washington and the United States Raeco (the United States)
- Coordinates: 47°22′59″N 122°24′28″W
- Country: United States
- State: Washington
- County: King
- Elevation: 482 ft (147 m)
- Time zone: UTC-8 (Pacific (PST))
  - Summer (DST): UTC-7 (PDT)
- Area code: 360
- GNIS feature ID: 1511247

Raeco is an unincorporated community in King County, in the U.S. state of Washington.

== History ==
A post office called Raeco was established in 1907, and remained in operation until 1911. The community's name is an acronym of the surnames Rhodes, Appel, and Earnest.
