= Wolf Lake (Yukon) =

Lake in Yukon, Canada

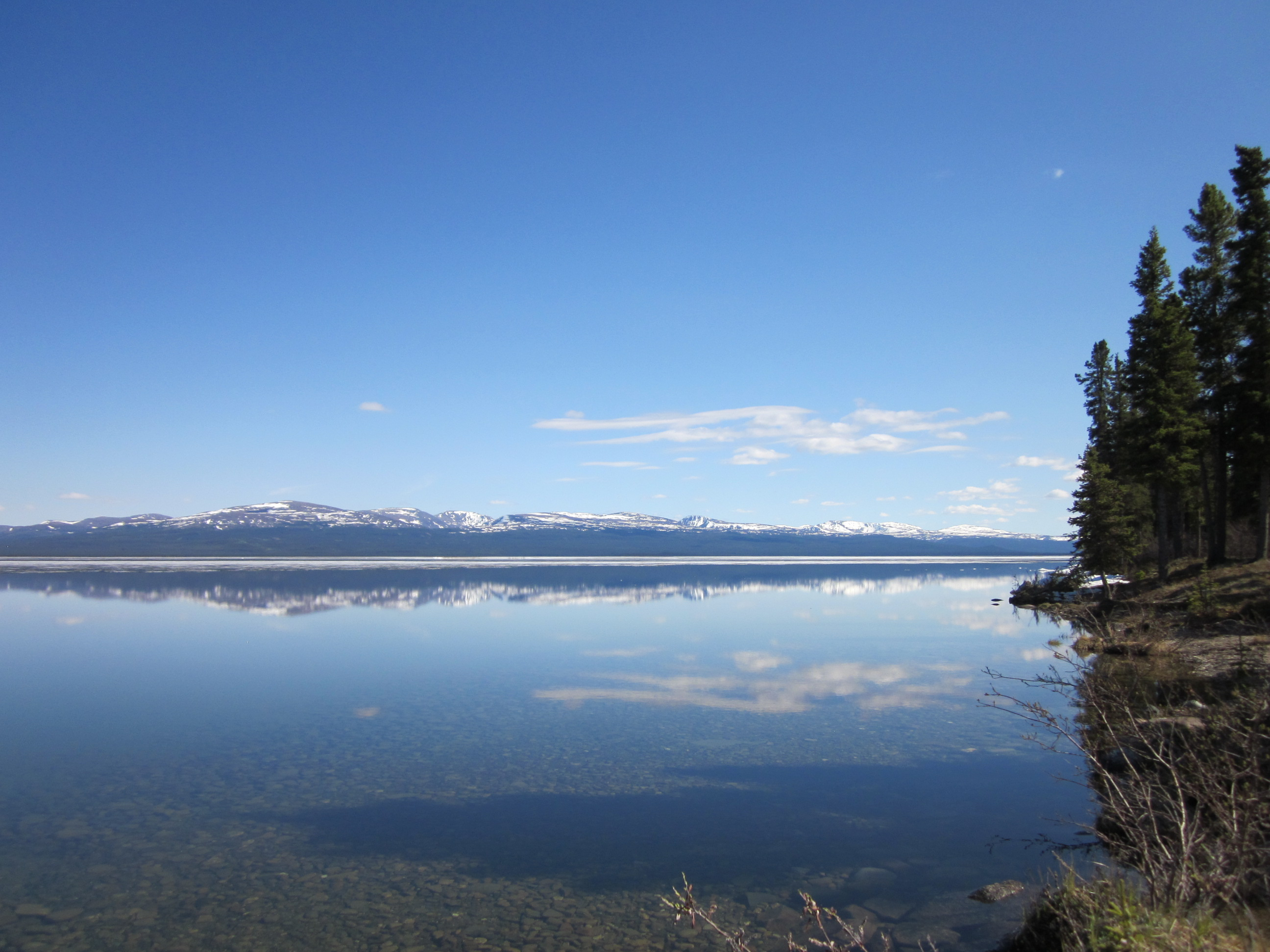
- Wolf Lake June 2012

- Location within Yukon
- Location: Yukon
- Coordinates: 60°39′19.9″N 131°40′44.4″W
- Primary outflows: Wolf River
- Basin countries: Canada
- Max. length: 21 km (13 mi)
- Max. width: 4 km (2.5 mi)
- Surface area: 7,312 ha (18,070 acres)
- Average depth: 26.6 m (87 ft)
- Max. depth: 84 m (276 ft); 72 m (236 ft)
- Surface elevation: 986 m (3,235 ft)
- Islands: 1

Wolf Lake (also known as Gooch Aa) is located in Yukon, Canada near Teslin. The lake is surrounded by tundra and wooded lowlands and mountains. The lake is also commonly fished for its lake trout. In 1998 Parks Canada, the Teslin Tlingit Council, and the Teslin Renewable Resources Council held a discussion about a feasibility study for a national park in the area. Later in 1998 the Yukon government issued the Protected Areas Strategy including Wolf Lake as a protected area. The Yukon Bureau of Statistics took a survey in the area to find the views of the community of the plan for a national park, at the request of the Teslin Renewable Resources Council. They found the plan for a national park had strong support but some disapproval as some feared the park would interfere with tradition.

Wolf Lake Lodge is located on the West shore of the lake in a secluded bay. Visitors to the lodge have the luxury of uninterrupted peace and tranquility during their stay. Lake trout up to 60lbs are caught in Wolf Lake, along with Northern Pike, Arctic Grayling and whitefish. Abundant moose, eagles, caribou and birds make this area a nature lover's paradise, made extra special by the occasional sighting of wolves, lynx and bears.

Wolf River is the main outflow from Wolf Lake, draining into Teslin lake. Arctic Grayling are plentiful. The river has been described by some as "the best Natural Grayling fishery in the world.". The lake is located at an elevation of 986 m (3,235 ft), has an area of 7,312 ha (18,070 acres), a maximum depth of 72 m (236 ft) and an average depth of 26.6 m (87 ft).
