= Wellesley Lake =

Lake in Yukon, Canada

- Location within Yukon
- Location: Yukon, Canada
- Coordinates: 62°21′N 139°48′W
- Basin countries: Canada
- Max. length: 13.5 km (8.4 mi)
- Max. width: 6.5 km (4.0 mi)
- Surface area: 73.81 km^{2} (28.50 sq mi)
- Average depth: 23.8 m (78 ft)
- Max. depth: 47.0 m (154.2 ft)
- Surface elevation: 540 m (1,770 ft)

Wellesley Lake is a 13.5-by-6.5-kilometre (8.4 by 4.0 mi) lake in Yukon, Canada with an area of 73.81 km^{2} (28.50 sq mi), an average depth of 23.8 metres (78 ft) and a maximum depth of 47.0 metres (154.2 ft). The lake is popular for angling.
