= Mesena, Georgia =

- Unincorporated community
- Location within Georgia
- Coordinates: 33°27′35″N 82°35′24″W
- Country: United States
- State: Georgia
- County: Warren
- Elevation: 561 ft (171 m)
- Time zone: UTC-5 (Eastern (EST))
  - Summer (DST): UTC-4 (EDT)
- ZIP code: 30819
- Area codes: 706 & 762
- GNIS feature ID: 332375

Mesena is an unincorporated community in Warren County, Georgia, United States. The community is located near the county's eastern border with McDuffie County, 5.5 miles (8.9 km) northeast of Warrenton. Mesena has a post office with ZIP code 30819.

Mesena is said to have been named by J. F. (or J. H.) Hamilton, who coined it from the initial letters of the first names of his six daughters (Mary, Evelyn, Sara, Emily, Nancy, and Ann).
