= Ts'oogot Gaay Lake =

Lake in western Canada

- Location within Yukon
- Location: Yukon
- Coordinates: 62°36′56.016″N 140°59′26.016″W
- Basin countries: Canada
- Surface area: .18 km^{2} (0.069 sq mi)
- Surface elevation: 567 m (1,860 ft)

Ts'oogot Gaay Lake is one of Canada's most westerly lakes, located in the south-west corner of Yukon at the Beaver Creek border with Alaska, 30 kilometres (19 mi) NW along the Alaska Highway from Beaver Creek's townsite. Ts'oogot Gaay Lake is 567 metres (1,860 ft) above sea level and measures 0.18 km^{2} (0.069 sq mi).

This lake complex also includes Ch'į̀hjiit Lake, Dlaałäl Lake, and Mänh Ts'eek. The highest point nearby is 792 m (2,598 ft) above sea level, 2.1 km (1.3 mi) west of Ts'oogot Gaay Lake. It extends 1.2 kilometres (0.75 mi) in the north–south direction, and 0.8 km (0.50 mi) in the east–west direction.

The vegetation around Ts'oogot Gaay Lake is mainly sparse and often low-growth subarctic forest. The annual average temperature in the valley is −5 °C (23 °F). The warmest month is July, when the average temperature is 14 °C (57 °F), and the coldest is January, at −24 °C (−11 °F).
