= Independence Historic District (Independence, Oregon) =

Historic district in Oregon, United States

- U.S. National Register of Historic Places
- U.S. Historic district
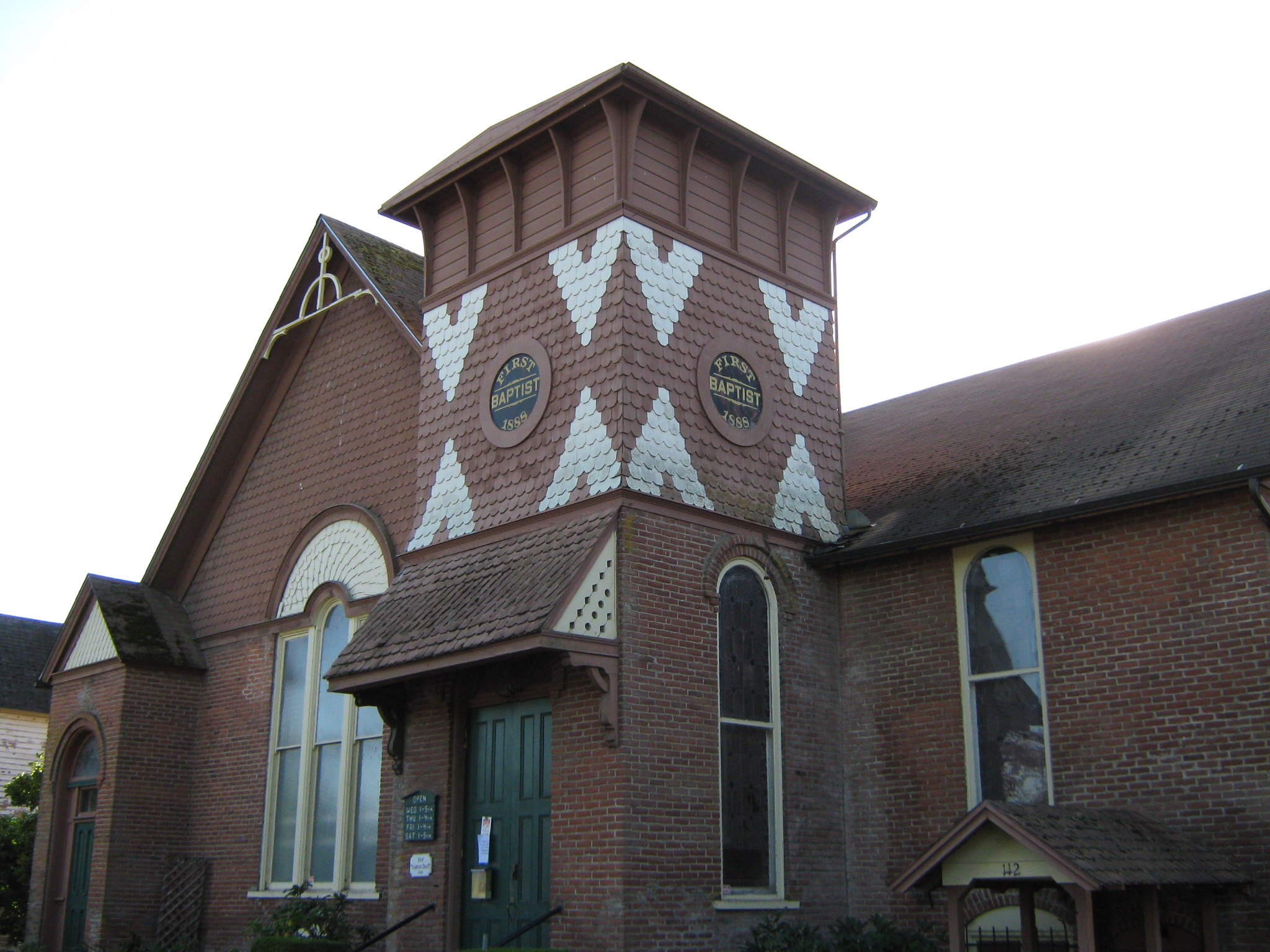
- The Independence Heritage Museum (former First Baptist Church) in 2008.

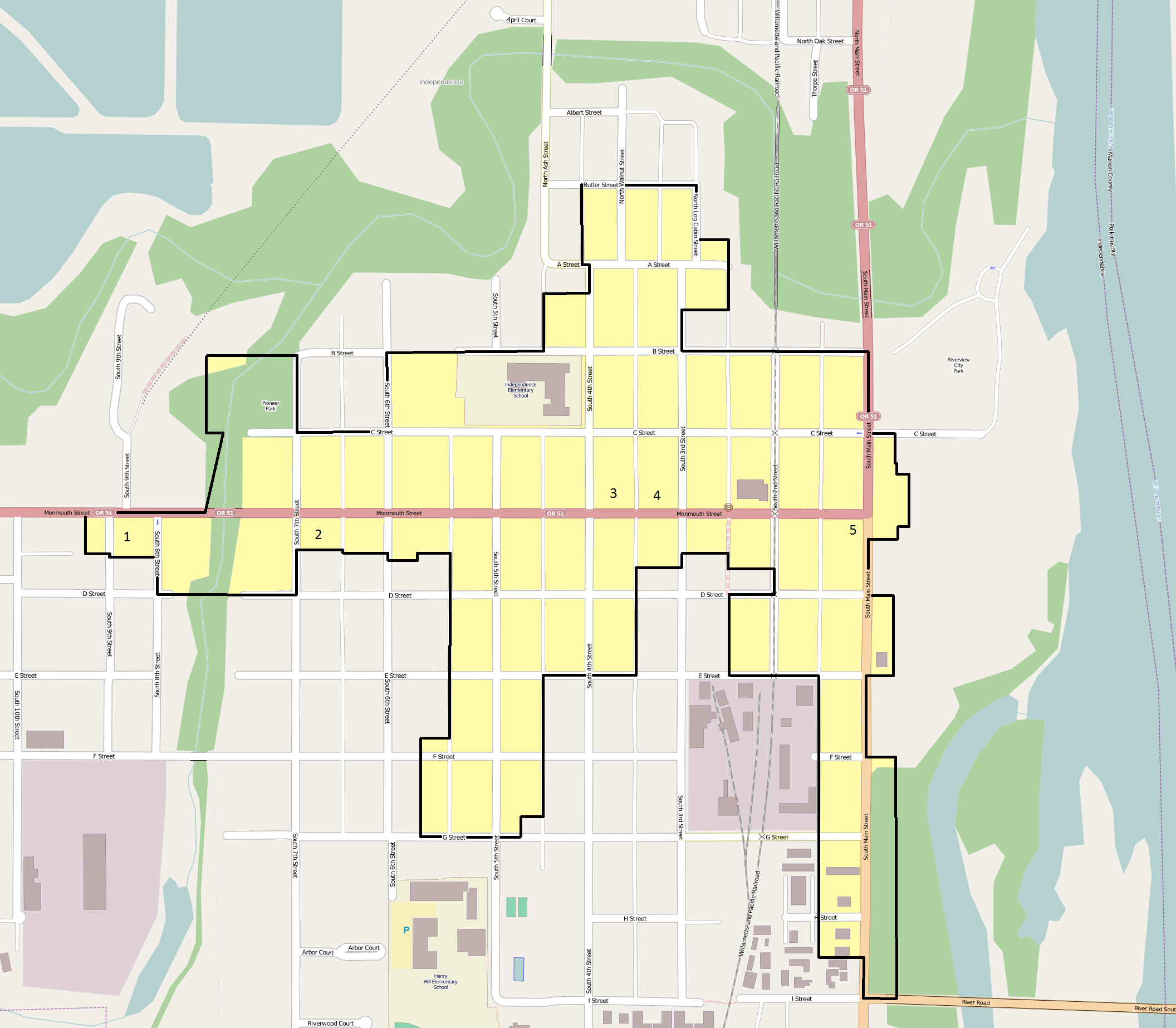
- District boundaries.
- Location: Roughly bounded by Butler, Main, G, and Ninth streets, Independence, Oregon
- Coordinates: 44°51′02″N 123°11′23″W
- Area: 98.7 acres (39.9 ha)
- Architect: Multiple
- Architectural style: Queen Anne, Gothic Revival, Victorian, Italianate, Craftsman
- NRHP reference No.: 89000048
- Added to NRHP: March 1, 1989

Independence Historic District in Independence, Oregon, United States is a historic district that was listed on the National Register of Historic Places (NRHP) in 1989. The roughly 30-block district preserves approximately 250 homes and businesses of a prosperous riverside town of the 1880s.

== History ==
Main Street, running along the Willamette River, is notable as an example of a late-nineteenth/early-twentieth century main street and features two commercial buildings with prominent Victorian-era towers. Most of the buildings on Main Street were built of brick between 1880 and 1900.

Independence thrived as a shipping point, by both rail and boat, for agricultural products and lumber until the 1950s. The city was known for its hops production from the 1890s through the 1940s, dubbing itself the "Hop Capital of the World." When the demand for hops dropped, the city's fortunes began to decline. One reason Independence is so well-preserved today is that it was bypassed by major freeways in the 1960s, so there wasn't a push to modernize the downtown. Today the historic district is being revitalized as a tourism destination.

== Individual listings within the district ==
The district includes five buildings separately listed on the NRHP:

- Dr. John E. and Mary D. Davidson House (c. 1878)
- Independence National Bank (1891) designed by architect Walter D. Pugh
- Kersey C. Eldridge House (1914)
- J. A. Wheeler House (c.1880)
- Saint Patrick's Roman Catholic Church (c. 1874)

== See also ==
- Alcohol in Oregon
- Oregon breweries
