= Wevaco, West Virginia =

- Unincorporated community
- Location within West Virginia and the United States Wevaco (the United States)
- Coordinates: 38°00′7″N 81°25′29″W
- Country: United States
- State: West Virginia
- County: Kanawha
- Elevation: 1,250 ft (380 m)
- Time zone: UTC-5 (Eastern (EST))
  - Summer (DST): UTC-4 (EDT)
- GNIS ID: 1555961

Wevaco is an unincorporated community and former coal town in Kanawha County, West Virginia, United States. It had a post office but is now closed.

The community's name is an acronym of the name of the local West Virginia Colliery Company.
