= Lamasco =

District of Evansville, Indiana

Coordinates: 37°59′N 87°35′W

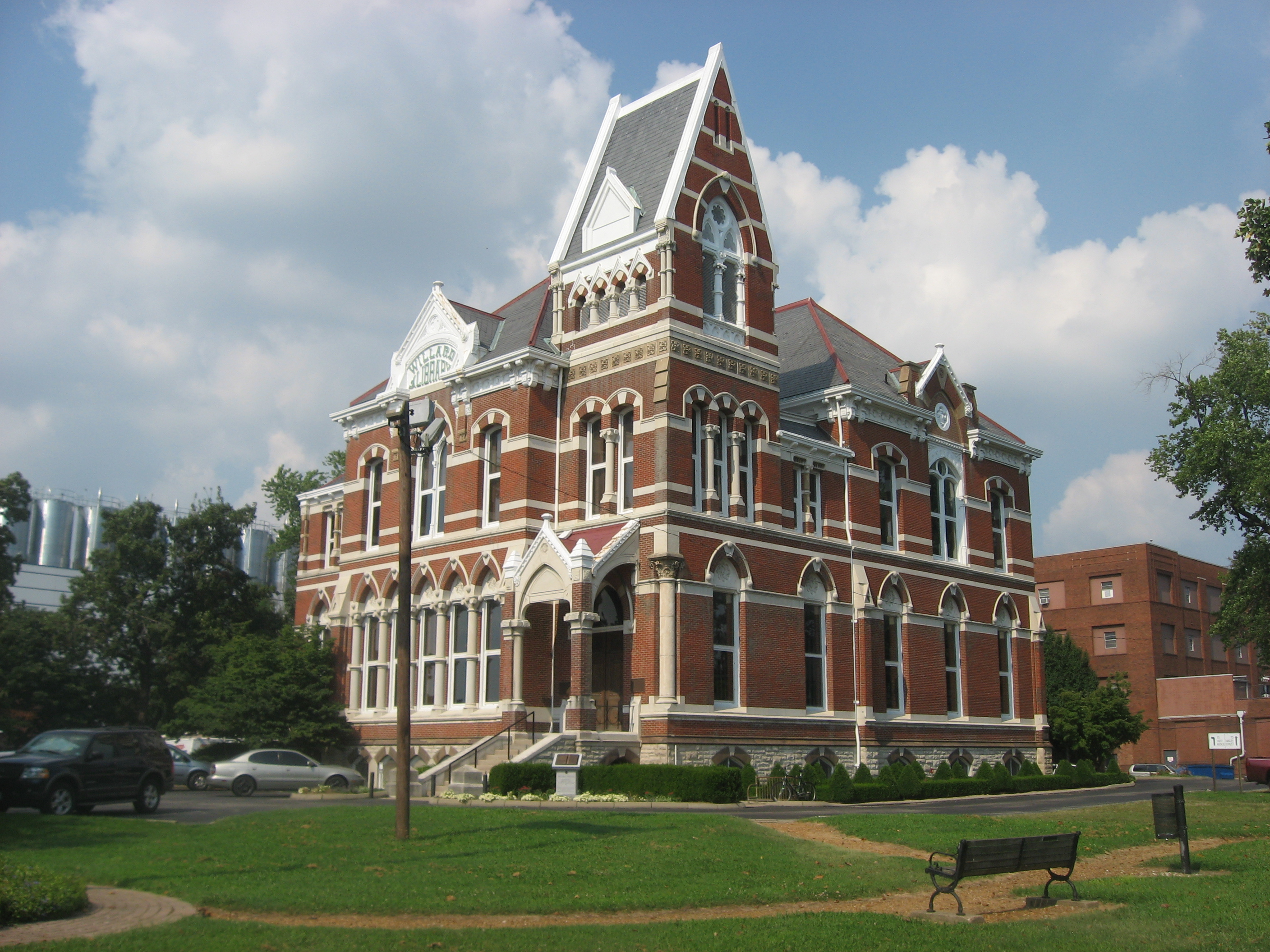
The stately Willard Library

Lamasco is a former town, and current district, in Evansville, Indiana originally bounded by the present day streets of St. Joseph Avenue on the west, First Avenue on the east, Maryland on the north and the Ohio River on the south to Fulton (meaning Pennsylvania east of Fulton). Lamasco includes the Independence Historic District, which was placed on the National Register of Historic Places in 1982. Part of this historic district includes West Franklin Street, a retail and service center with a 100-foot-wide street that plays host to the annual West Side Nut Club Fall Festival.
