= Whispering Forest =

Neighborhood in Big Bear City, California

Coordinates: 34.2690°N 116.8613°W

Whispering Forest is a residential community on the hills of the North Shore of Big Bear City, CA, just north of the Big Bear City Airport (opposite side of W. North Shore Drive). The neighborhood is located less than a mile north-east of Baker Pond and just 500 feet north of the airport. It borders National Forest to the north, Division Drive to the west, and the West North Shore Drive to the south. It is situated at the base of National Forest and backs to woodlands and densely forested areas to the north. Areas such as Holcomb Valley, the Pacific Crest Trail and Caribou Creek are all accessible to the north through Van Dusen Canyon Road in the east. It is an established neighborhood developed by the Whispering Forest Development Company. It is situated at a 6,750 feet elevation and is frequently suffering wildfires during the hotter summer months. The neighborhood is also frequently visited by wildlife such as black bears and mountain lions.
