= McEvoy Lake =

Lake in Yukon, Canada

- Location within Yukon
- Location: Yukon
- Coordinates: 61°48′6″N 130°14′8″W
- Basin countries: Canada
- Surface area: 4,242.62 acres (1,716.93 ha)
- Shore length^{1}: 22.06 mi (35.50 km)
- ^{1} Shore length is not a well-defined measure.

McEvoy Lake is a lake located in Yukon, Canada. It has an area of 4,242.62 acres (1,716.93 ha) and a shoreline of 22.06 miles (35.50 km).
