= Minerva, Oregon =

Unincorporated community in the state of Oregon, United States

- Unincorporated community
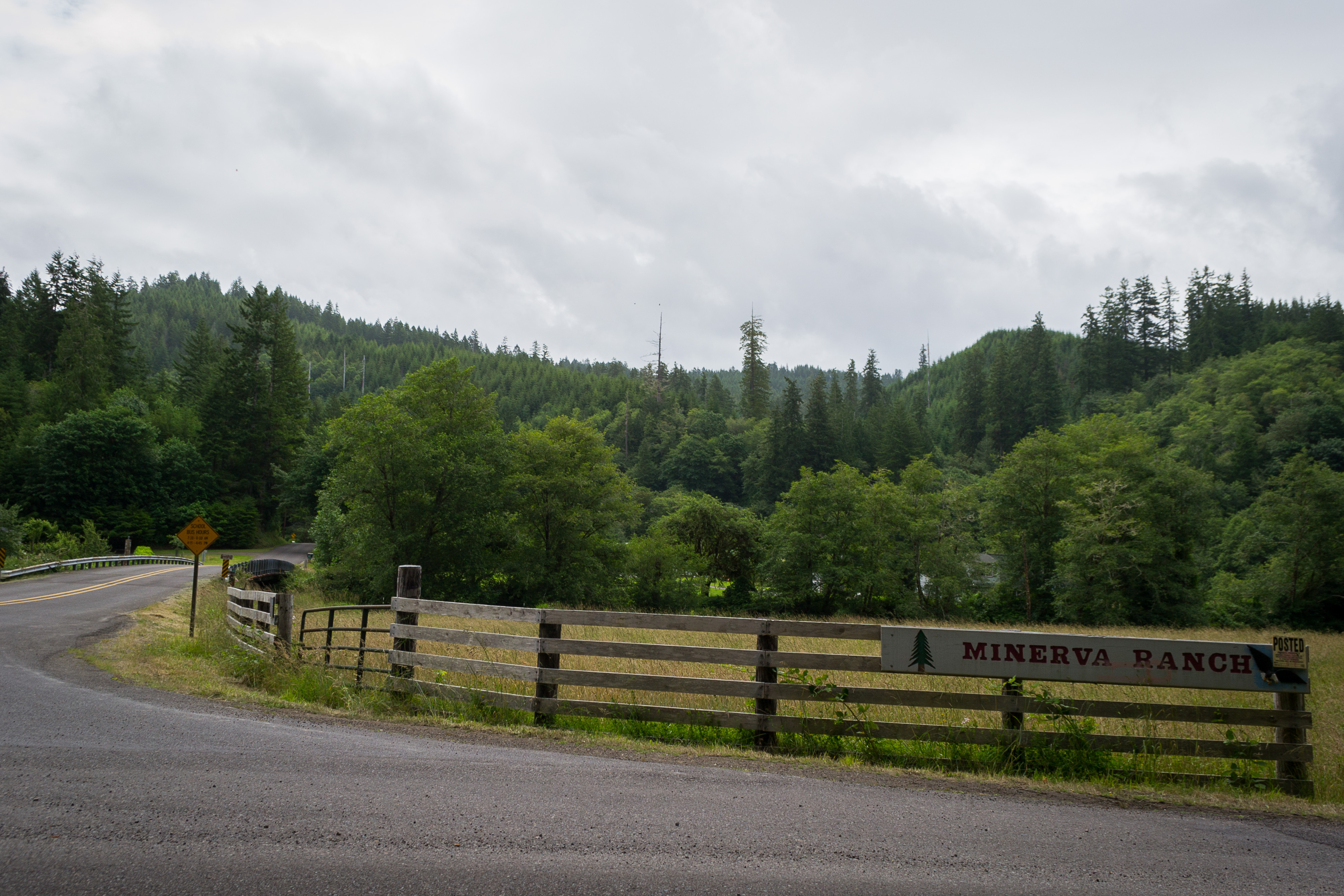
- A ranch in Minerva

- Location within Oregon Location within the United States
- Coordinates: 44°04′14″N 123°57′37″W
- Country: United States
- State: Oregon
- County: Lane
- Elevation: 56 ft (17 m)
- Time zone: UTC-8 (Pacific (PST))
  - Summer (DST): UTC-7 (PDT)
- ZIP code: 97439
- Area codes: 458 and 541
- GNIS feature ID: 1146323

Minerva is an unincorporated community in Lane County, Oregon, United States. It is located about 13 miles (21 km) northeast of Florence near the North Fork Siuslaw River within the Siuslaw National Forest.

== History ==
When local settlers petitioned the post office department for a new office in the 1890s, the name "Bays Landing" was suggested to honor local resident James E. Bay. The department suggested a one-word name would be more convenient, so the office was named Minerva after Mr. Bay's wife. L. C. Ackerley wrote the petition and the post office was first located in the Ackerley home. The post office closed in about 1940.

At one time Minerva had a store with a gas pump, a United Evangelical Church, a grange hall, and public school, but none of these remain at the site today. The school at Minerva served students in grades 1 through 8, and older students attended boarding school in Florence. When a road was constructed to Florence students of all ages attended school there and the Minerva school was closed.
