= Neyami, Georgia =

Unincorporated community in Georgia, U.S.

Coordinates: 31°49′26″N 84°12′55″W

Neyami is an unincorporated community in Lee County, in the U.S. state of Georgia.

== History ==
A variant name was "Adams". The community had about 30 inhabitants in 1900. A post office called Adams was established in 1897, and remained in operation until 1925. The current name comes from the first two letters of the names of the three subdevelopers: Newton, Yancy and Milner.
