= Snafu Lakes =

Lake in Yukon, Canada

Snafu Lake
- Location within Yukon
- Location: Yukon
- Coordinates: 60°10′48.8″N 133°26′36.7″W
- Primary outflows: Snafu Creek
- Basin countries: Canada

The Snafu Lakes are a chain of lakes in southern Yukon, Canada, about 25 to 30 km (15 to 20 mi) north of the border with British Columbia. It is drained by Snafu Creek. The two lakes principally of interest to anglers are Upper Snafu and Lower Snafu, which are separated by about 1.5 kilometres (0.9 mi) of the Snafu Creek. The lakes have the following dimensions:

Lake	Length		Area		Average depth		Maximum depth	
Lake	km	mi	ha	acre	m	ft	m	ft
Lower Snafu	9.4	5.8	284	700	6.3	21	25	82
Upper Snafu			343	850	14.7	48		

The name is from WWII-era Military slang meaning Situation Normal, All Fouled Up.

== See also ==
- List of lakes in Yukon
