= Swenoda Lake =

Lake in the state of Minnesota, United States

- Location within Minnesota
- Location: Pope County, Minnesota
- Coordinates: 45°32′24″N 95°18′57″W
- Type: lake

Swenoda Lake is a lake in Pope County, in the U.S. state of Minnesota.

Swenoda is a portmanteau of Swedish, Norwegian, and Danish, commemorating the nationalities of the pioneers who first settled in the area.

== See also ==
- List of lakes in Minnesota
