= Cascades Railroad =

Overview
- Headquarters: Cascades, Washington
- Locale: Skamania County, Washington
- Dates of operation: 1860–about 1907

Technical
- Track gauge: 3 ft (914 mm)
- Previous gauge: 4 ft 8 1/2 in (1,435 mm) standard gauge 5 ft (1,524 mm)

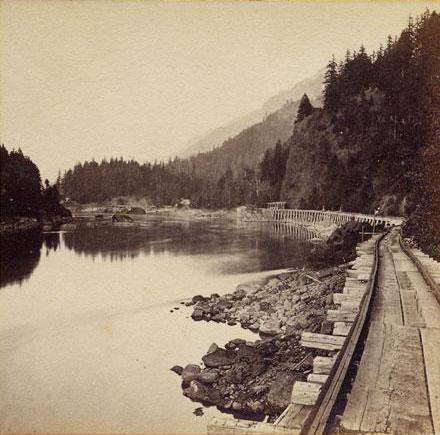
Tooth Rock Bridge on the Cascades Portage Railway, 1867

The Cascades Railroad ran for about 6 miles (9.7 km) on the north bank of the Columbia River around the Cascades Rapids. The owner was the Oregon Steam Navigation Company. The railroad operated as a portage around the rapids.

== History ==
Francis A. Chenoweth built a wooden tramway using mules on the north bank of the river in 1851. He sold the tram way to Daniel and Putnam Bradford who incorporated it as the Cascades Railroad. The Great Flood of 1862 (which began in November 1861) swept away the tramway. It was rebuilt as railroad by the Oregon Steam Navigation Company and returned to operation with two steam locomotives named "ANN" and "BETSY" on April 20, 1863. The railroad was 5 ft (1,524 mm) broad gauge from 1860 to 1880, 4 ft 8 1/2 in (1,435 mm) standard gauge from 1880 to 1883, and 3 ft (914 mm) narrow gauge from 1883 until the close of operations. One of its five small locomotives, No. 7, was sold in 1900 to the Ilwaco Railway and Navigation Company.

== See also ==
- Oregon Portage Railroad
