= Gazelle (1854 sidewheeler) =

American ship

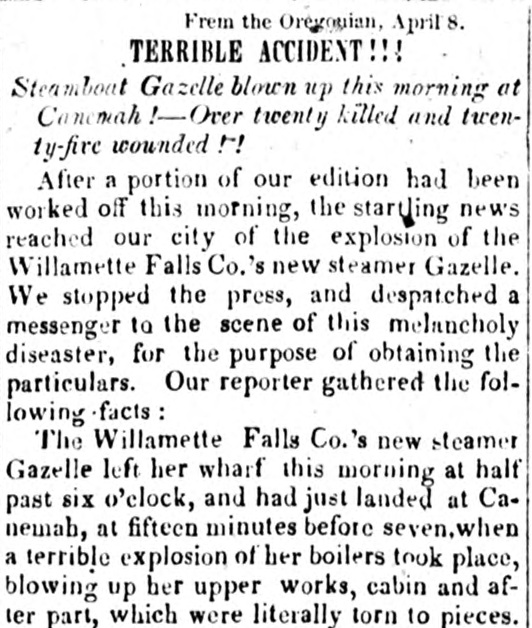

History
- Name: Gazelle
- Builder: Willamette Falls Milling and Transport Co., Linn City, Oregon
- Completed: 1854
- Maiden voyage: March 14, 1854
- Fate: Boiler exploded April 8, 1854 at Canemah, upper works destroyed.
- Notes: Hull salvaged, upper works rebuilt, and renamed (briefly) Sarah Hoyt and later Señorita.

General characteristics
- Type: inland shallow draft passenger/freighter/towboat
- Length: 145 ft (44 m)
- Beam: 23 ft (7 m)
- Depth: 5.0 ft (2 m) depth of hold
- Installed power: twin steam engines, high-pressure, one cylinder each, 14.5" bore by 48" stroke
- Propulsion: sidewheels
- Notes: Engines later installed on sternwheeler Okanogan, built in 1861.

Gazelle was an early sidewheeler on the Willamette River in what is now the U.S. state of Oregon. She did not operate long, suffering a catastrophic boiler explosion on April 8, 1854, less than a month after her trial voyage. This was the worst such explosion ever to occur in the Pacific Northwest states. The wrecked Gazelle was rebuilt and operated for a few years, first briefly as the unpowered barge Sarah Hoyt and then, with boilers installed, as the steamer Señorita. A victim of the explosion was D.P. Fuller, age 28, who is buried in Lone Fir Cemetery in Portland, Oregon.

== Design and construction ==
Gazelle was built by the Willamette Falls Milling and Transportation Company at the now vanished town of Linn City, which was located on the west side of the Willamette River across from Oregon City. The Willamette Falls Company was supported financially by the California banking firm of Page, Bacon & Co.

Gazelle was 145 ft (44 m) with a beam of 23 ft (7 m) and depth of hold of 5.0 ft (2 m).

Gazelle was driven by two high-pressure steam engines, each one turning one of her sidewheels. Each engine had a single cylinder with a bore diameter of 14.5 inches and a piston stroke of 48 inches. Gazelle's builders were doing business as the Willamette Falls Canal, Milling and Transportation Company, referred to at the time as the "Willamette Falls Company."

The choice of a side-wheel design, adopted by all the early steamers on the Columbia and Willamette rivers, was an error, as the sternwheel design was much better suited to the conditions.

== Reaching the upper river ==
Built below Willamette Falls, Gazelle was intended to run on the Willamette River above the falls, to serve the growing population in the Willamette Valley. To reach the upper river, Gazelle was lifted above the falls and launched on the upper Willamette at Canemah.

== Operations ==
Gazelle made its trial run above the falls on March 18, 1854. The steamer was scheduled to run to Salem and Corvallis, Oregon. The first commander of Gazelle was Robert Hereford, a Californian.

As of March 17, 1854, Gazelle was engaged in regular service running upriver from Oregon City. Gazelle departed at 7:00 a.m. on Tuesdays and Friday of each week, bound for upriver points, including Butteville, Champoeg, Crawford's Landing, Weston, Fairfield, Salem, Cincinnati, Independence, Washington, Albany, and Corvallis, Oregon. Gazelle operated with another steamer owned by the same company, the Belle, Capt. William B. Wells commanding, to carry passengers and freight from Portland to Oregon City, below Willamette Falls.

The company's freight schedule charged $2 per ton for freight on Belle to Milwaukie, and $3 per ton for cargo to Oregon City. For points above Oregon City, freight rates rose sharply, reflecting the cost of transshipment around Willamette Falls, starting with $10 per ton for freight to Butteville and Champoeg, ranging up to $20 per ton for shipments to Corvallis.

The company built a warehouse on the west side of Willamette Falls, at Linn City opposite from Oregon City, for the purpose of transshipping freight around the falls. The company intended to control transportation in the Willamette Valley.

Passenger rates from Portland to Oregon City on Gazelle were $2 each way; additional fares were charged for upriver travel, starting with $1 for passengers bound for Butteville and Champoeg, going up to $5 for passengers going to Corvallis.

Part of the route served by Gazelle was also served by the company's steamer Oregon, which as of March 17, 1854, ran from the company's warehouse in Oregon City at 7:00 a.m. every Monday and Thursday for Salem, calling en route at two points on the Yamhill River, Dayton and Lafayette, Oregon

The Oregon City newspaper was enthusiastic about the new steamer:

The fine weather and good music tended not a little to enhance the pleasure of the ladies and gentlemen on board, and all were highly entertained and pleased. Her tables are laden with Oregon's choicest productions, together with a select variety of imported fruits, etc. Who wishes for better accommodations, even in this tyee (Note: Chinook Jargon for "chief," "king[ly]," "excellent", or "the best.") day of Oregon refinement?

During one trip, Gazelle stood by to assist as the sidewheeler Oregon, owned by the same company, was sinking after hitting a snag just below Salem. Cargo from the Oregon was loaded onto Gazelle to lighten Oregon to better allow her salvaging. Suddenly Oregon broke free of the snag, drifted downstream, ran up on a sandbar and sank so deeply that only a part of her upperworks were visible above the water. Oregon, also a new steamer, was a total loss. On the way back down, Gazelle ran over a log and broke some paddle buckets, which, however, was not serious damage, and was actually one of the strengths of the paddlewheel design over the propeller on inland waters.

== Destruction ==
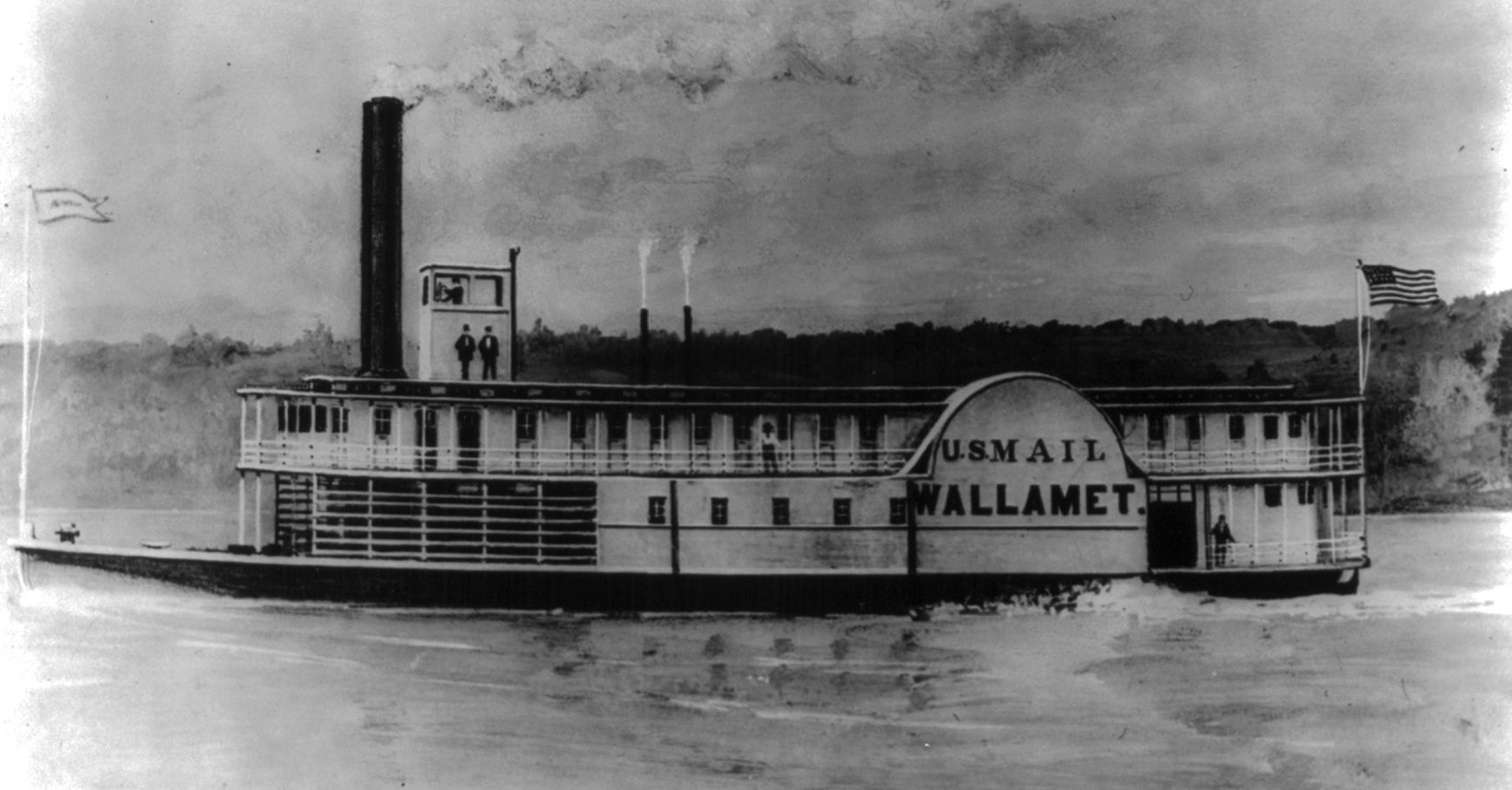
The steamer Wallamet, moored nearby when Gazelle exploded on April 8, 1854.

On April 8, 1854, at 6:30 a.m., Gazelle had come over to Canemah from the long wharf built above the falls on the western side of the river above Linn City, sometimes called the "basin".

This was to be the steamer's first regular run after the trip up river where she had attempted to assist the Oregon. That morning, bound for Corvallis. Gazelle had been at the Canemah dock for about ten minutes. To make a speedy departure, the engineer had tied down the safety valve to build up steam.

According to contemporaneous reports, the chief engineer, Tonie (or Toner), had run Gazelle across the river, and stopped briefly alongside the steamer Wallamet to take on freight. Wallamet was then under command of Capt. Charles H. Bennett (1811–1855), whose crew was just then preparing for breakfast.

On board Gazelle, the steam was "howling from escape pipe with a deafening roar." The chief engineer then moved Gazelle further on to the Willamette Company's wharf-boat, where he stopped the steamer, and then himself disembarked on to the wharf-boat. According to one source, the chief engineer took off running. The wharf-boat was either "a few rods" or 100 yards upriver from where the Willamet lay.

About one minute later, at about 6:40 a.m. both boilers exploded on Gazelle. Captain Bennett on board Wallamet exclaimed: "My God, the Gazelle has blown up — man your small boats." This order was just in time, as already people blown off Gazelle were starting to float downriver towards the falls. About 60 people had been on board Gazelle. At least twenty people were instantly killed, and almost everyone else was injured, including four people who died later.

Pieces of bodies were blown in all directions, including into the river and on to the shore, but most of the persons killed were found on the forward deck. David D. Page, chief superintendent of the company, was killed; his head "dashed to pieces", he could only be identified by his clothing. All the machinery, partitions and furniture had been blown off the main deck. The upper deck had been blown completely away as far as the wheelhouse, and the captain's cabin and clerk's office had been lifted off the deck and moved two feet forward. Most of the boilers were completely missing, and part of one, along with the smoke stack, was said to have been seen flying nearly across the river.

=== Persons killed ===
Notable people who died were Samuel Townsend Burch, also known as Judge Birch, of Polk County or Luckiamute member of the 1849 Oregon Territorial Legislature, and James White, operator of the ferry in Salem.

James White was the father of Leonard White, who became one of the great pioneering steamboat men of the Pacific Northwest.

The pilot of Wallamet, James M. Fudge, had stepped on board Gazelle when Gazelle had come alongside, and had been blown into the river with his lower spine severed by a flying piece of debris. He died within a few minutes.

Others killed included John Clemmens (or Clemens), the pilot, several other crew, and numerous passengers. Captain Hereford was scalded, but survived.

=== Rescue and recovery ===
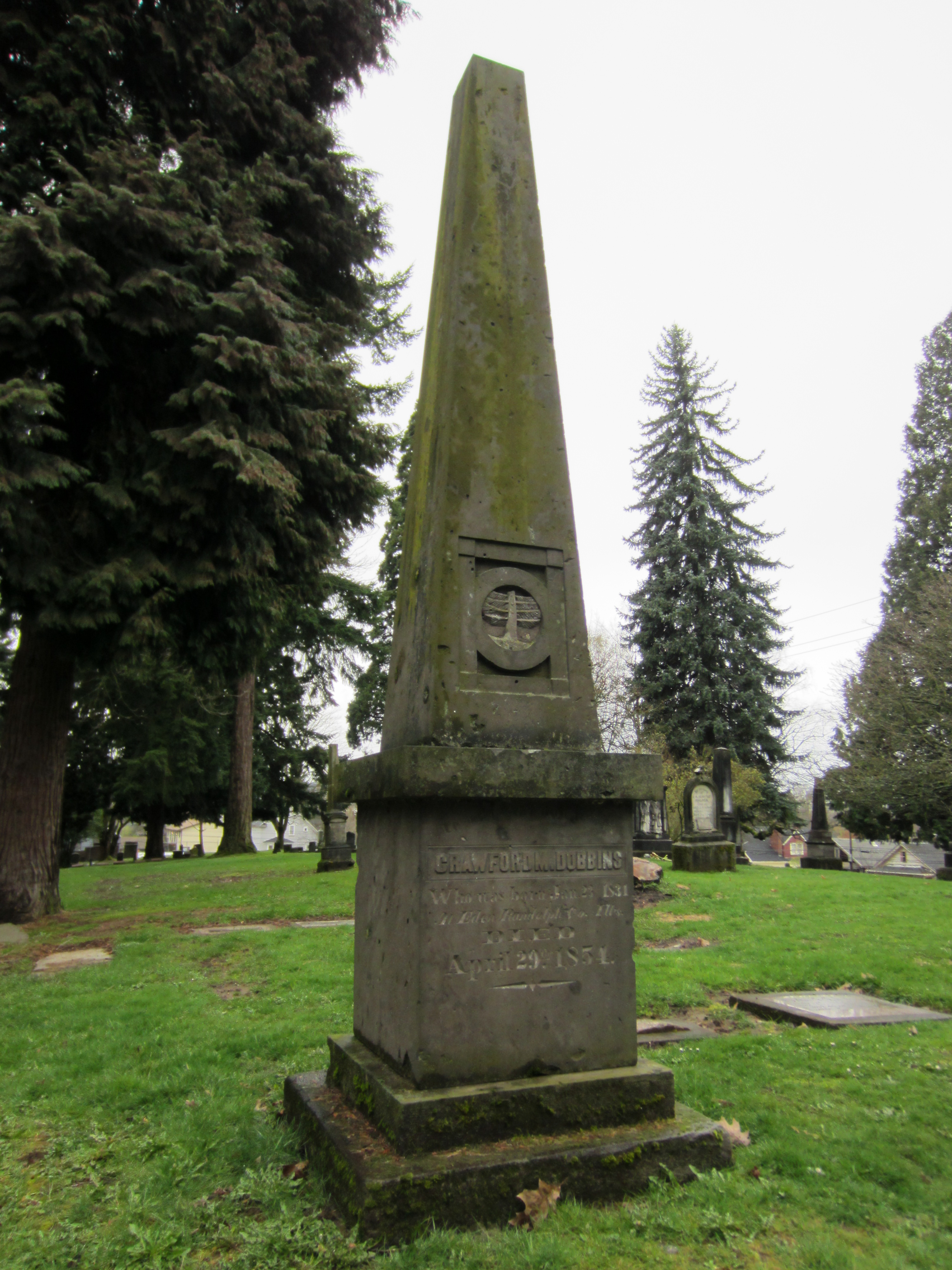
Grave monument for Crawford Dobbins, victim of the 1854 explosion of Gazelle, in Lone Fir Cemetery, in Portland, Oregon.

The whole town of Canemah came running to the rescue, and boats had to be launched to rescue the living people and recover the bodies floating in the river. The first man at the scene, according to his own report many years later, was Joseph Buchtel (1830–1916), who was then the steward on Wallamet. Buchtel said that people were struggling in the water while people on shore were standing around not knowing what to do. Buchtel organized the people and they rescued four or five persons in the water who were in danger of going over the falls.

When word of the explosion reached Portland, the steamer Multnomah was dispatched at once with several surgeons on board to assist the wounded in Oregon City.

Local citizens in Canemah opened up their businesses and spare rooms to help the wounded and store the bodies of the dead until they could be recognized and claimed. The day after the explosion, the steamer Wallamet proceeded upriver under Captain George A. Pease (b.1830 or 1831), as pilot, stopping at every landing to leave off the wounded and the dead.

The conduct of Rev. J.L. Parrish, of Salem, and Capt. Bennett of the steamer Wallamet, was particularly praised thirty years later by a crewman who had been on Wallamet at the time of the explosion.

A number of the victims, including David P. Fuller and Crawford M. Dobbins, were buried in the Lone Fir Cemetery by its founder, Colburn Barrell in his own family plot. Fuller and Dobbins were friends of Barrell. Fuller was killed instantly, while Dobbins lived to April 28, 1854. Barrell named the cemetery "Mount Crawford" after his friend. Later the name was changed to Lone Fir Cemetery. Barrell also paid for a monument for Dobbins, which bears the image of a lone fir.

=== Cause of the explosion ===
Jacob Kamm, an experienced steamboat man, examined the wreckage, and stated that the explosion was caused by a poor grade of iron used in the boiler and a defective pump. However, little could be known with certainty, with the second engineer having been killed and the chief, Toner, absent. Toner was later heard of in the Puget Sound area, but he never returned to Oregon to give a statement as to the cause.

A coroner's jury was formed, over which Dr. Forbes Barclay officiated as coroner. The coroner's jury blamed the engineer's "gross and culpable" negligence in keeping too much steam, and allowing the water level in the boilers to get too low.

== Salvage and reconstruction ==
The hull sank. Later it was sold to Alexander Sinclair Murray (b.1827), William B. Wells (d.1863), Richard Hoyt, and one or two other people. The new owners intended to place the vessel into the Astoria and Cowlitz river trade.

On June 23, 1855, it was reported that a contractor named Barnum, of Linn City, had agreed, for $1,350, to take Gazelle from the boat's moorings at Canemah, safely across the falls to the lower river.

The hull, engines, and cabin remnants were brought around Willamette Falls on August 11, 1855, by means of a runway of timbers on which rollers were placed, with a launch way or slide on the lower side of the falls.

== Operations as Señorita ==
When rebuilt, the vessel was renamed Sarah Hoyt. It had no boiler, and was used as barge for a time, being towed behind other riverboats. Later, in the fall of 1856, a new boiler was installed, the boat was renamed Señorita and placed on the route from Portland to the Cascades rapids. The boat was used to carry troops, horses, and army stores from Portland to army posts at Fort Vancouver and the Cascades. Julius Sorenson (1836–1909) was one of the captains of Señorita in this time.

The engines salvaged from Gazelle turned out to be too small for the Señorita's work on the Cascades run, so they were removed and placed in a new steamer, the Hassalo (also spelled Hassaloe), completed in 1857 just above the Cascades of the Columbia. After the engines were replaced, Señorita was commanded by L. Hoyt, brother of Richard Hoyt.

Señorita was used in a rate war by the new owners, the Bradford brothers, who controlled the portage railroad around the Cascades rapids, on the north side of the river, and were competing with another portage on the south side of the river.

With the more powerful engines installed, in 1857 Señorita was used occasionally on the Cascades route, with Captain Wells in command, and, in place of Multnomah, on the run from Portland to Astoria, Oregon. Most of the time Señorita was used as a tow boat. In October 1858, Señorita under Captain Hoyt, became the first steamer on the Columbia to tow more than one vessel at once, taking the bark Ork, the brig Francisco and the schooner Rosaltha upriver from Astoria to Portland.

In 1859, Señorita became one of the first vessels of the Oregon Steam Navigation Company. Señorita was chartered by Jacob Kamm, J.S. Ainsworth and their associates, which combined with their control of several other steamers, gave them a near monopoly over river travel on the Columbia and Willamette rivers.

Señorita was inspected by the U.S. Steamboat Inspectors on July 5, 1859, meaning the vessel was still in service at that time. The inspector, O.A. Pitfield, praised the construction and speed of the Señorita and the other vessels of the Columbia and Willamette rivers which he had inspected on July 5, 1860.

== Dismantled ==
Señorita was "pretty badly shaken up" during one run to the Cascades in 1858, when the hurricane deck was blown off, and other damage was sustained. According to one source, it was for this reason, and high operation costs, that Señorita was soon thereafter withdrawn from service and sent to the scrapyard.

Dismantling of the Señorita, reported to have occurred in 1859, must have occurred after the date of the inspection. The engines from Señorita were installed in a new steamer, the Okanogan, a sternwheeler built in 1861 at the confluence of the Deschutes and Columbia rivers, upstream from Celilo Falls.

== Historic memory ==
Memorial to steamer Gazelle

600 yards south of this point
Explosion of Steamer Gazelle
April 8, 1854.
Loss of twenty-four lives.
Marked May 13th, 1933 by Multnomah Chapter D.A.R.

On July 3, 1929, Ella Millar Grover (c.1848–1929), died in Vevey, Switzerland. She had been the widow of civil war soldier, then Lieutenant Cuvier Grover, who had rescued Ella Millar as a six-year-old child from the wreck of the Gazelle, and married her 21 years later in 1875. Ella Millar Grover was believed to have been the last living survivor of the explosion when she died. Her father, Rev. James P. Millar, had been killed in the explosion.

In May 1933, the Multnomah chapter of the Daughters of the American Revolution placed a bronze memorial plaque on a rock outcropping overlooking the Willamette River and the long-abandoned Canemah landing.

The marker was scheduled to be unveiled on May 13, 1933, by Joseph W. Bodd, a great-great-grandson of Rev. Mr. Millar. An address was scheduled to be given by Judge Fred W. Wilson, of The Dalles, Oregon, whose grandfather, Rev. James P. Millar, had been killed in the Gazelle explosion. The marker is at 45°21′01″N 122°36′58″W.

In August 1939, a dramatization of the explosion, by John Hawkins, of Gladstone, Oregon, was broadcast on Portland radio station KGW.

== See also ==
- Lone Fir Cemetery
- Oregon Steam Navigation Company
