= Oregon Pony =

Steam locomotive

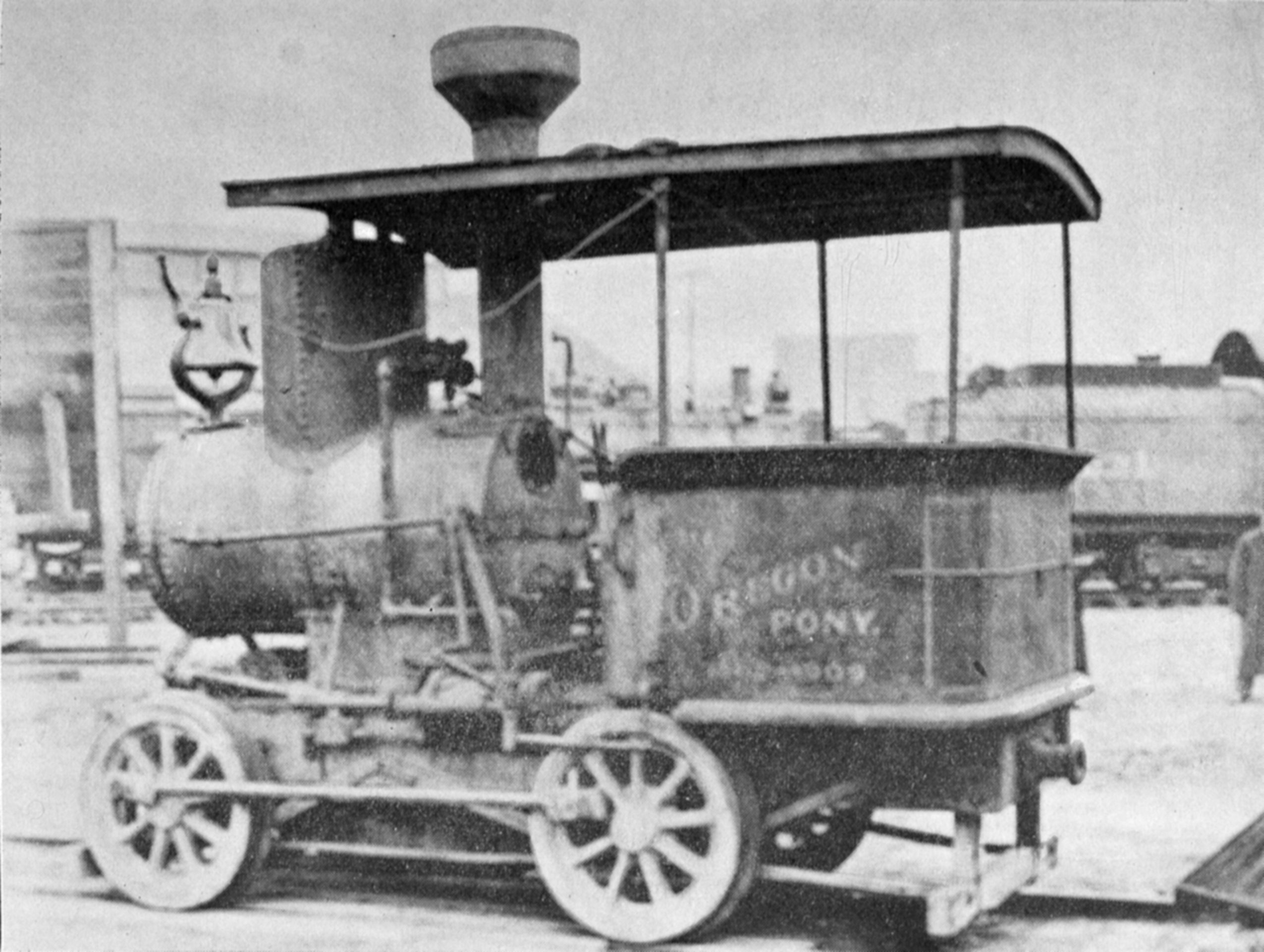
Type and origin
- Power type: Steam
- Builder: Vulcan Iron Works of San Francisco, CA
- Build date: 1861
Specifications
- Configuration
  - Whyte: 0-4-0
- Gauge: 5 ft (1,524 mm)
- Driver dia.: 34 in (860 mm)
- Length: 14 ft 6 in (4.42 m)
- Width: 10 ft 9 in (3.28 m)
- Height: 15 ft 4 1/2 in (4.69 m)
- Loco weight: 16,000 pounds (7.3 metric tons; 7.1 long tons)
- Fuel type: wood
- Boiler pressure: 130 psi (900 kPa) (possibly)
- Cylinders: Two, outside
- Cylinder size: 9 in × 18 in (229 mm × 457 mm)
- Train heating: Steam
Career
- Operators: Oregon Portage Railway, Oregon Steam Navigation Co.
- First run: 1862
- Retired: 1873 (stored until 1904)
- Restored: 1904, 1981
- Current owner: State of Oregon
- Disposition: Environmentally controlled static display at the Cascade Locks Historical Museum in Cascade Locks, Oregon

The Oregon Pony was the first steam locomotive to be built on the Pacific Coast and the first to be used in the Oregon Territory. The locomotive, a 5 ft (1,524 mm) gauge gear-driven locomotive with 9 in × 18 in (229 mm × 457 mm) cylinders and 34 in (860 mm) drivers, was used in the early 1860s to portage steamboat passengers and goods past the Cascades Rapids, a dangerous stretch of the Columbia River now drowned by the Bonneville Dam. Steamboats provided transportation on the Columbia between Portland, Oregon and mining areas in Idaho and the Columbia Plateau. Portage was also necessary at other Columbia River navigation obstructions, including Celilo Falls.

San Francisco's Vulcan Iron Works built the wood-burning engine in 1861 for $4,000. The design of the Oregon portage locomotives (three were ordered at the time) used a return flue boiler (with the stack projecting up from the cab roof), an outside frame, and four coupled driving wheels. At least one of the engines of the Market Street Railroad used a near-identical design. Weighing only 8 short tons (7.3 t; 7.1 long tons) and only 14 ft 6 in (4.42 m) long, the Oregon Pony arrived in Oregon in 1862 on the steamer Pacific, and made its initial run on May 10, 1862, with engineer Theodore A. Goffe at the throttle, who had supervised her construction and assembly. It replaced flat cars running on rails, equipped with benches for passengers and pulled by mules for 4.5 mi (7.2 km) over iron-reinforced wooden rails for the Oregon Portage Railroad.

Shortly after the Oregon Pony was put into service, canopies were added to protect the passengers and their goods from the smoke emitted down as the locomotive operated. The engine moved nearly 200 tons a day on the rail route between the Cascades and Bonneville. Portage owners Ruckel and Olmstead received $20 per ton for transporting freight from one end of their portage to the other. Forty cubic feet by measurement counted as one ton.

There is no record of when the two larger Oregon Ponies built by the Vulcan Iron Works arrived, or which of the three portage railroads they were initially assigned to, the Oregon side at The Cascades, the Washington side at The Cascades, or the 14 mi (23 km) section on the Oregon side 41 mi (66 km) upriver, between The Dalles and Celilo Falls. It is believed these two locomotives were named "Ann" and "Betsy". The various accounts all show April 1863 as the completion date for all three portage railroads.

The railway was bought by Oregon Steam Navigation Company (OSN). April 20, 1863 was the date the “Oregon Pony” made its last run on the Cascades portage. The company consolidated its Cascades rail portage monopoly on the Washington side of the Columbia River and moved the Oregon Pony on May 11, 1863, to The Dalles, where it may have been used for portages around Celilo Falls. There is no evidence that the “Pony” ever actually operated on the Celilo portage.

In 1866, OSN sold the locomotive (for $2,000) to the Steam Paddy Company and it was shipped out of Portland on the Steamship Montana on October 18, 1866. It was returned to San Francisco for work filling and grading the streets of that city. It worked there until 1873, thereafter being stored in a warehouse. After the Oregon Pony was damaged in a 1904 warehouse fire, the owner, David Hewes, partially restored it and donated it to the Oregon Historical Society in Portland, Oregon. Col. Henry Dosch of Portland worked as a timekeeper for Hewes in San Francisco and discovered the “Oregon Pony” in use there. He was instrumental in having it brought to Portland for exhibition at the Lewis and Clark Fair in 1905.

It was displayed at the 1905 Lewis and Clark Exposition and afterward at the Albina Railyard. In 1931, the Oregon Pony was moved to Portland Union Station when a suitable pedestal was erected in front of the recently remodeled station. It was repainted, and displayed outside. It was borrowed by the Cenaqua Celebration at Vancouver, Wash. From August 7 to 13, 1950.

It was returned to Cascade Locks in 1970. The Port of Cascade Locks funded a 1981 restoration (back to its 1905 appearance; restored by Gales Creek Enterprises) and built a permanent, covered display. This restoration replaced the 1904 wooden timber frame and canopy, and was thorough and complete, but did not result in an operating artifact.

The Oregon Pony is currently owned by the State of Oregon and is preserved in a climate controlled exhibition chamber next to the Cascade Locks Historical Museum at the Marine Park, Cascade Locks. In February 2016, Trains Magazine reported that the Union Pacific Railroad donated $10,000 for shelter restoration for the Oregon Pony.
