= John Alexander (chief clerk) =

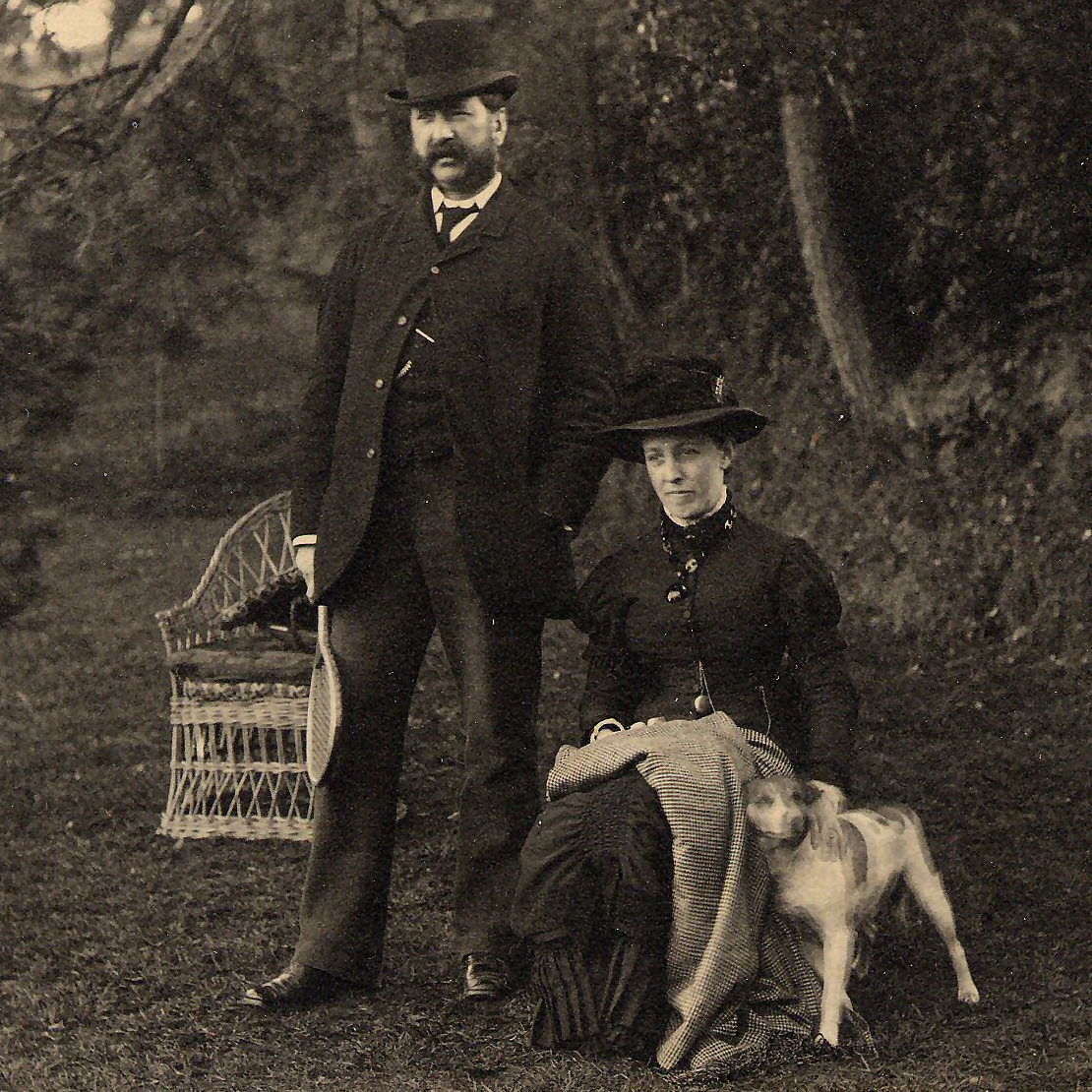
- John Alexander formally dressed in a garden with wife Mary Elizabeth (née Thwaites), about 1875.
- Born: 28 December 1830; Wooler, Northumberland
- Died: 3 October 1916 (aged 85); Sevenoaks, Kent
- Resting place: Wooler, Northumberland; 55:32.7586N 2:0.7496W
- Education: Royal High School, Calton Hill, Edinburgh
- Occupation: Chief Clerk to Bow Street Police Court
- Employer: UK Home Office
- Spouse: Mary Elizabeth Thwaites (m. 1846–1923)
- Children: James Finlay, Lucy Winifred, Gladys Mary, Elsie Margaret
- Parents: James Alexander (1796-1863) (father); Margaret Finlay (1797-1865) (mother)

John Alexander (Wooler, 28 December 1830 – 3 October 1916, Sevenoaks) was Chief Clerk to Bow Street Magistrates' Court, then called Bow Street Police Court (as seen in Alexander's summons to James McNeill Whistler), and simultaneously, as was then the custom, Editor of the Police Gazette in England from 1877 until his retirement in 1895.

== Family ==
John Alexander was born in Wooler, Northumberland, son of country physician and surgeon James Alexander (1797–1863). He was educated at the Royal High School, Edinburgh. Both his sisters married famous doctors: Christina Margaret (1833–1907) married Sir John Struthers, best known for his drawings of the beached Tay whale; Margaret Agnes (1841–1911) married John Ivor Murray, who built a hospital in Shanghai and became Colonial Surgeon in Hong Kong.

His wife, Mary Elizabeth Thwaites (1846–1923) was the eldest daughter of the engineer and founder of the Vulcan Iron Works at Bradford, Robinson Thwaites.

== Career ==
John Alexander oversaw many famous trials of the Victorian period including the Fenians (who dynamited Clerkenwell Prison and attacked the House of Commons, London Bridge, and the Tower of London among other places), and Johann Most the German anarchist.
