= Annie Faxon =

History
- Name: Annie Faxon
- Owner: Oregon Steam Navigation Company
- In service: 1877
- Out of service: April 14, 1893
- Identification: US 105718; US 106588 (after 1887 rebuild)
- Fate: Destroyed by boiler explosion at Wade's Bar, Snake River

General characteristics
- Type: inland shallow-draft passenger/freighter, all wooden construction
- Tonnage: 709 gross, 565 registered (after rebuild: 514 gross, 488 registered)
- Length: 165 ft (50 m)
- Beam: 34.4 ft (10 m)
- Depth: 5.6 ft (2 m) depth of hold (5.3 ft (2 m) after 1887 rebuild)
- Installed power: steam, high-pressure twin engines, horizontally mounted 17" bore by 72", stroke, 19 hp (14 kW) nominal
- Propulsion: sternwheel

Annie Faxon was a steamboat that was built by the Oregon Steam Navigation Company. She is chiefly remembered now for the catastrophic boiler explosion in 1893 that destroyed her and killed eight people on board.

== Design and construction ==
Annie Faxon was built at 1877 at Celilo, Oregon, and rebuilt 1887 at Texas Ferry, Washington. She was first owned by the Oregon Steam Navigation Company, and then by the Oregon Railway and Navigation Company when the shareholders of O.S.N. sold their stock at a huge profit.

== Navigation on the Columbia River ==
At that time, and for the entire operational life of this vessel, the Columbia River was not continuously navigable from Portland at tidewater. Instead the river was divided into reaches known as the lower, middle, and upper Columbia, each one separated by a long stretch of essentially unnavigable rapids. The reaches were like giant steps, and once a steamboat was built on a step, it could, with some danger, descend to a lower step by running the rapids. However, in general no steamboat could proceed up a step, although in some cases steamboats were dismantled and carried around the major rapids or smaller ones might be winched up by a line attached to the bank.

== Operations of Annie Faxon ==
Annie Faxon ran on the top step, that is, the reach above Celilo Falls. She was one of the largest steamboats to operate on these route. Boats like Annie Faxon on the upper Columbia could navigate 141 miles (227 km) up the Snake River to Lewiston, Idaho, and even beyond.

== Destruction ==
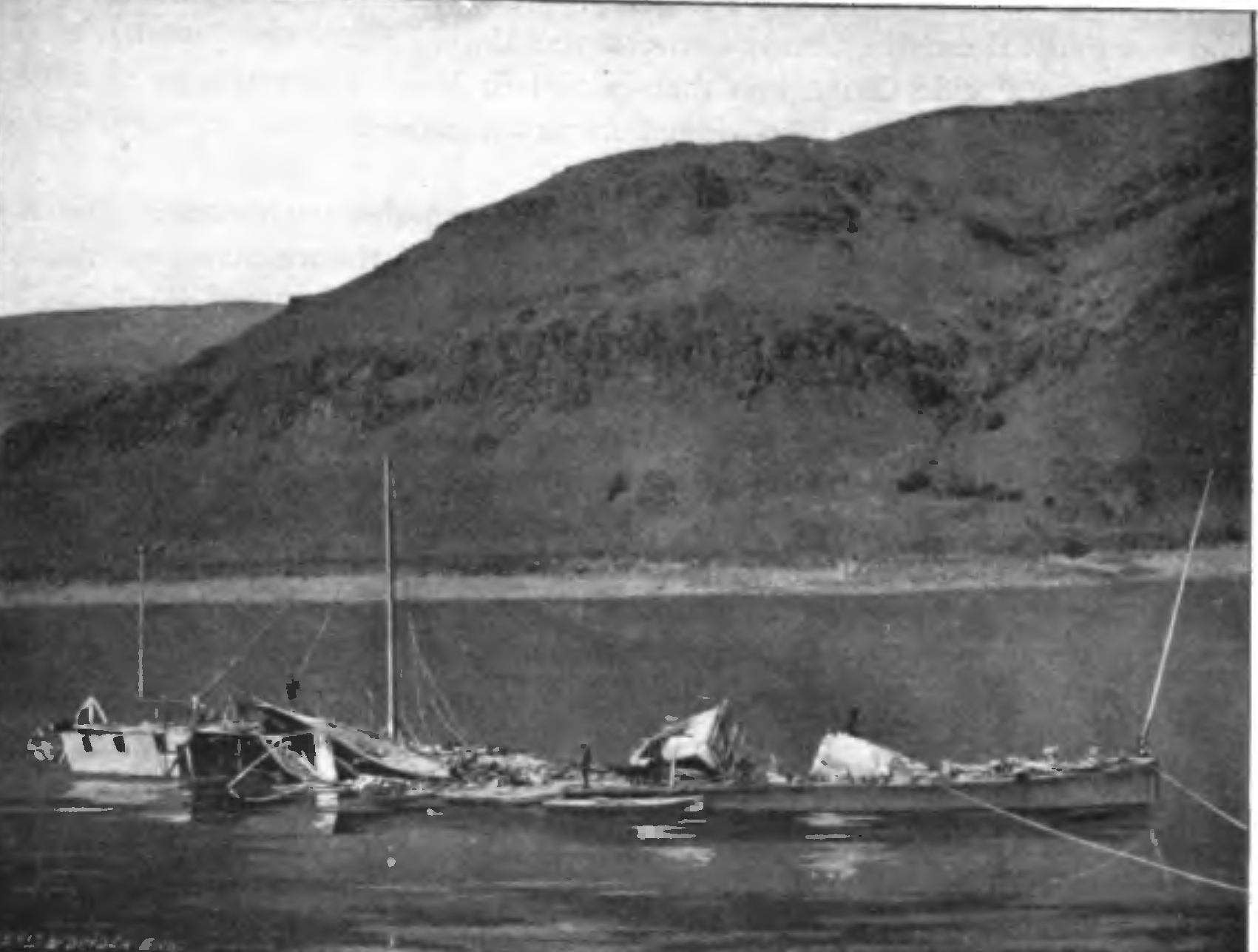
wreck of the Annie Faxon after explosion

On April 14, 1893, at 7:30 a.m., Annie Faxon was destroyed in a catastrophic boiler explosion. The boat was coming in for a landing with Captain Harry Baughman in command. Suddenly with no warning the boiler exploded and the upper works of the vessel were destroyed. Eight people were killed, including the bride of purser J.E. Tappen, who was blown into the river and drowned. The boat's pilot, Thomas McIntosh, had been beheaded by flying debris, and crewman William Kidd was blown to pieces. Captain Baughman, who had been standing next to pilot McIntosh, was blasted onto the shore, dazed and injured. Five crew members were killed: John McIntosh, Thomas McIntosh, William Kidd, Henry Bush, Pain Allen, George Farwell, and Scott McComb

== Cause of the explosion ==
The cause of the explosion was later said to be the failure of a safety valve (called a "fusible plug") to blow when the water level in the boiler fell too low. Just how this occurred was not quite certain. The vessel had been recently inspected, and while she was 16 years old at the time, she had been rebuilt in 1887 just six years before. The curious thing about this explosion was that it seemed to fit a pattern of explosions occurring not while racing but rather just after or before the vessel was coming in for a landing, as in the case of the Gazelle and the Senator.
