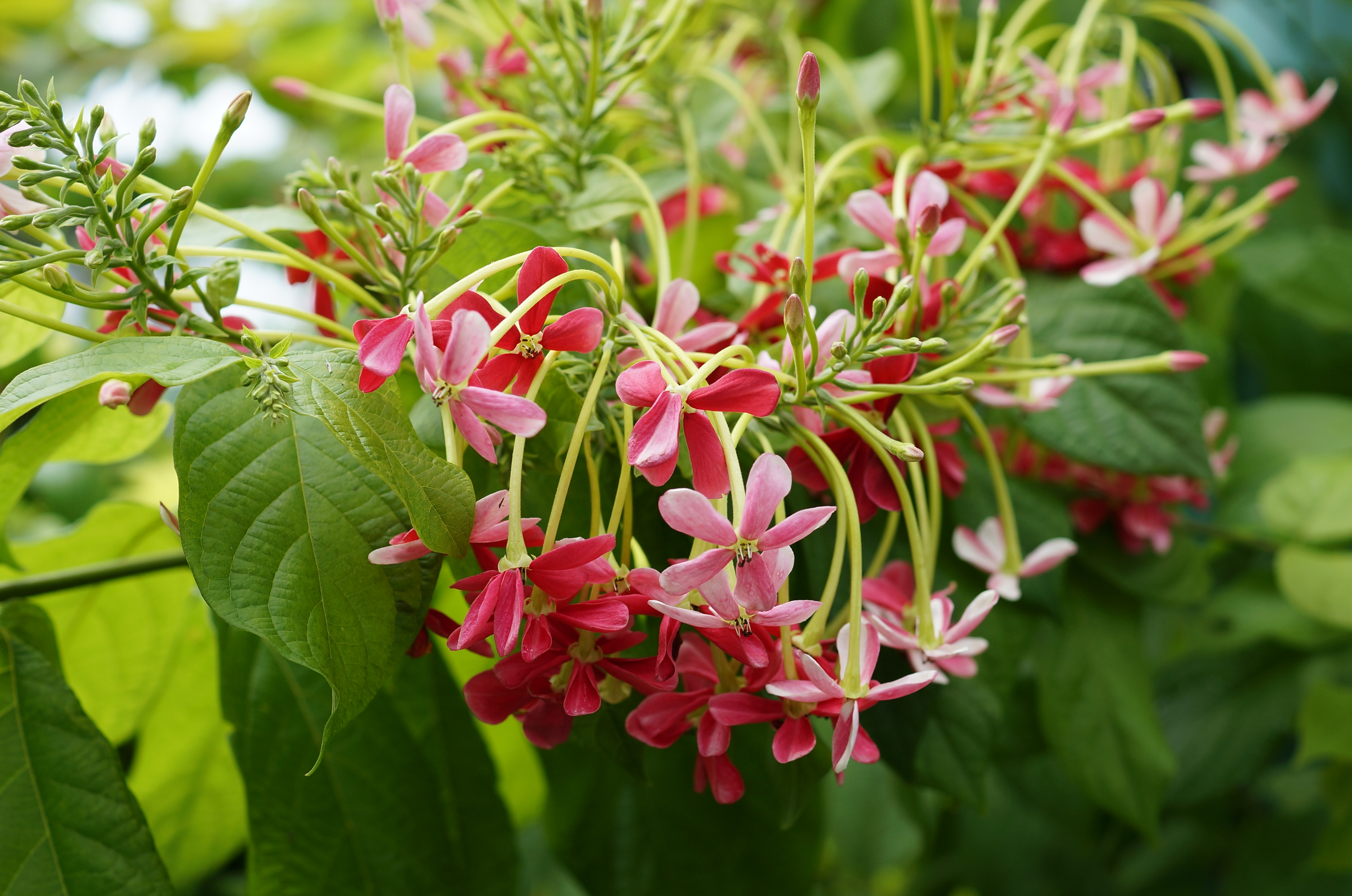

Scientific classification
- Kingdom: Plantae
- Clade: Tracheophytes
- Clade: Angiosperms
- Clade: Eudicots
- Clade: Rosids
- Order: Myrtales
- Family: Combretaceae
- Genus: Combretum
- Species: C. indicum

Binomial name
- Combretum indicum (L.) DeFilipps

Synonyms
- 16 synonyms: Quisqualis indica L.; Kleinia quadricolor Crantz; Mekistus sinensis Lour. ex Gomes Mach.; Quisqualis ebracteata P.Beauv.; Quisqualis glabra Burm.f.; Quisqualis grandiflora Miq.; Quisqualis indica var. oxypetala Kurz; Quisqualis indica var. villosa (Roxb.) Kurz; Quisqualis longiflora C.Presl; Quisqualis loureiroi G.Don; Quisqualis madagascariensis Bojer; Quisqualis obovata Schumach. & Thonn.; Quisqualis pubescens Burm.f.; Quisqualis sinensis Lindl.; Quisqualis spinosa Blanco; Quisqualis villosa Roxb.

= Combretum indicum =

Species of plant

Combretum indicum, commonly known as the Rangoon creeper or Burma creeper, is a vine with red flower clusters which is native to tropical Asia and grows in thickets, primary and secondary forest, and along river banks in the Indian subcontinent, Malaysia and the Philippines. It has since been cultivated and naturalized in tropical areas such as Burma, Vietnam, and Thailand.

This plant is grown as an ornament.

== Description ==
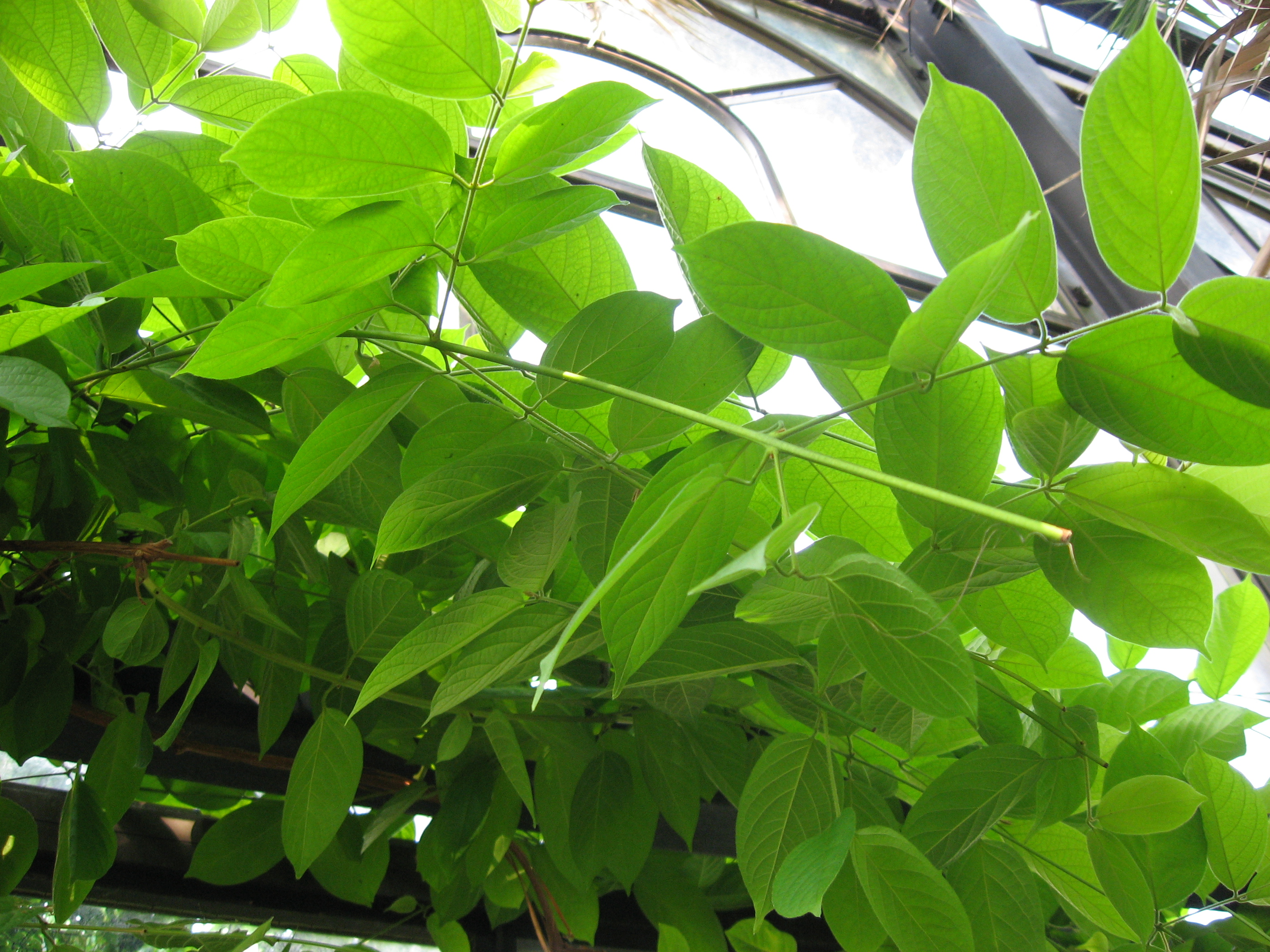
Leaves

The Rangoon creeper is a vigorously climbing ligneous vine that can reach from 2.5 meters to up to 8 meters. The leaves are simple, elliptical in outline, with an acuminate tip and a rounded base; they are from 7 to 15 centimeters long and their arrangement is opposite.

=== Flowers and fruit ===
The flowers are tubular, consisting of oblong petals 6–8 mm long. They are fragrant and have long receptacles to adapt for pollinators with long tongues.

They change in colour with age and it is thought that this is a strategy to gather more pollinators. The flower is initially white and opens at dusk to attract hawkmoths. On the second day it turns pink, and on the third it turns red attracting day flying bees and birds. The flower also changes from a horizontal orientation to a drooping pose.

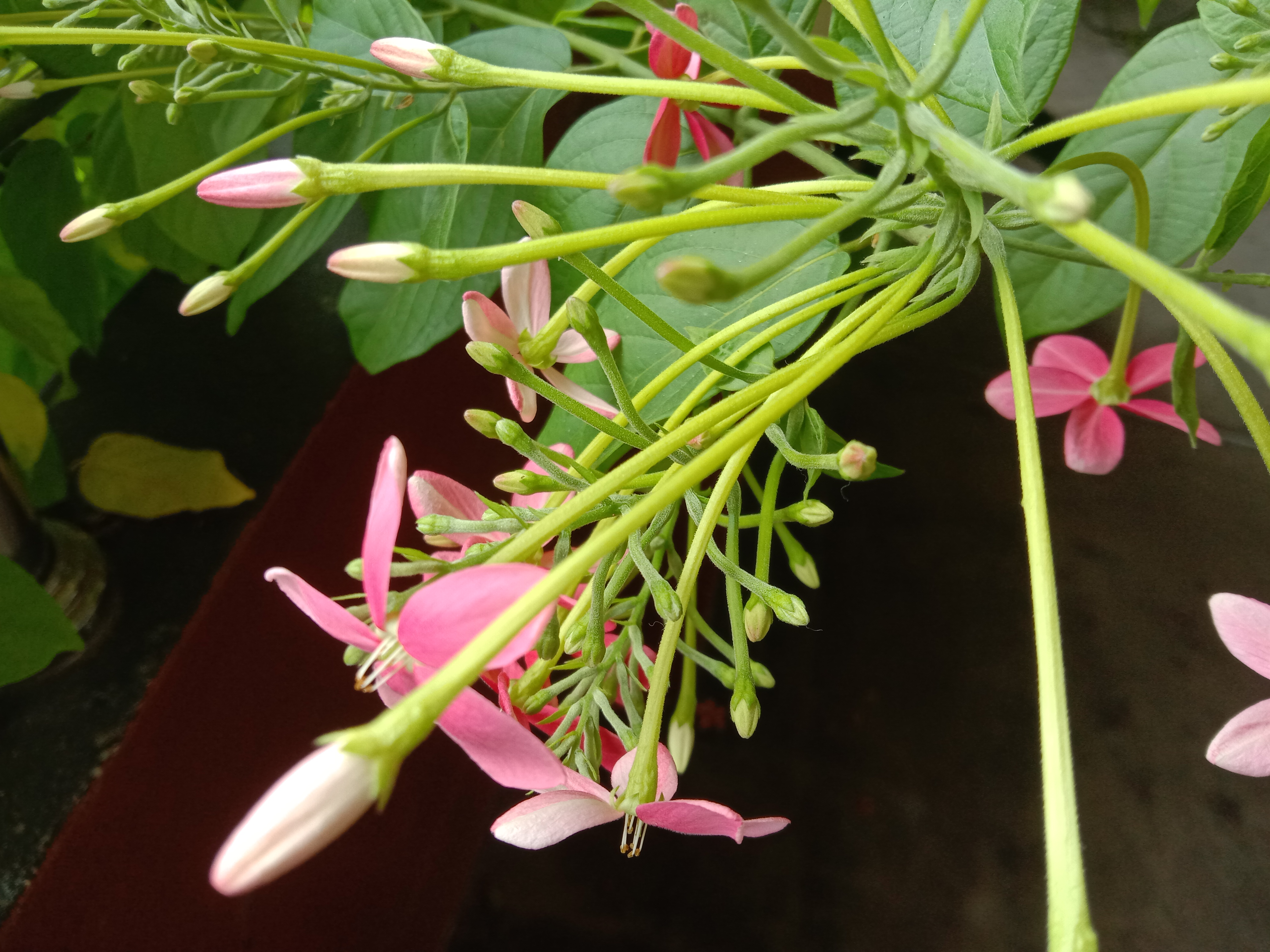
Buds and flowers of Combretum indicum in West Bengal, India

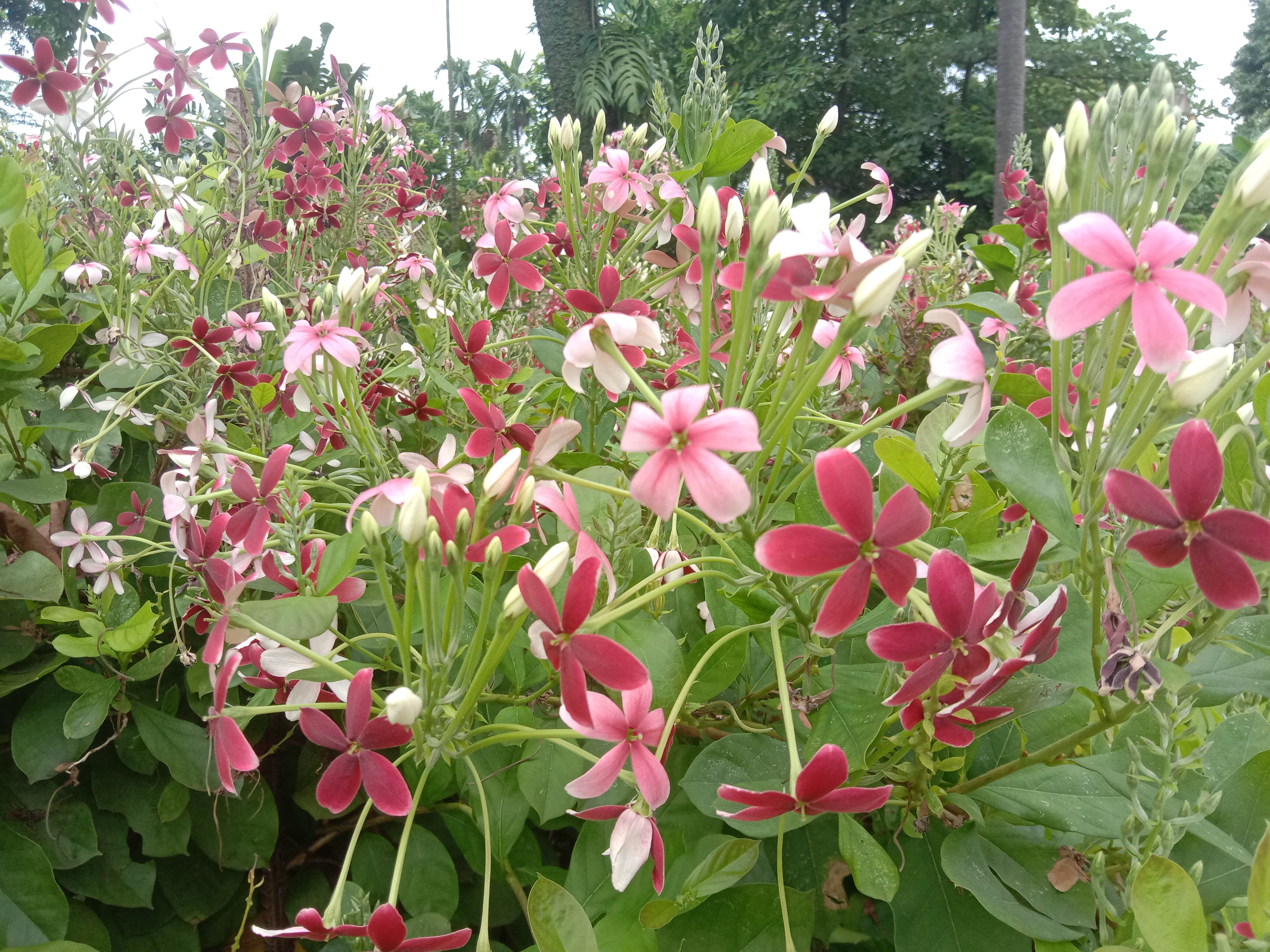
Flowers in morning

Rangoon creeper can be found flowering throughout the year if the temperature remains high enough and enough water is available.)

The 30 to 35 mm long fruit is dark brown, ellipsoidal and has five stiff and prominent wings. The seed tastes like almond or coconut when mature.

== Potential toxicity ==
The seeds of this and related species, Quisqualis fructus and Q. chinensis, contain the chemical quisqualic acid, which is an agonist for the AMPA receptor, a kind of glutamate receptor in the brain. The chemical is linked to excitotoxicity (cell death). The seeds have been used for treating roundworm and pinworm infections. It is toxic to the parasite and kills it in the digestive tract.

== History ==
Dr John Ivor Murray sent a sample of the "nuts" to the Museum of Economic Botany in Edinburgh in 1861, with a note that they were "used by the Chinese for worms" and a description of the means of preparation and dosage.

This species was previously known as Quisqualis indicum but was reclassified along with 6 other Quisqualis species.

== Gallery ==
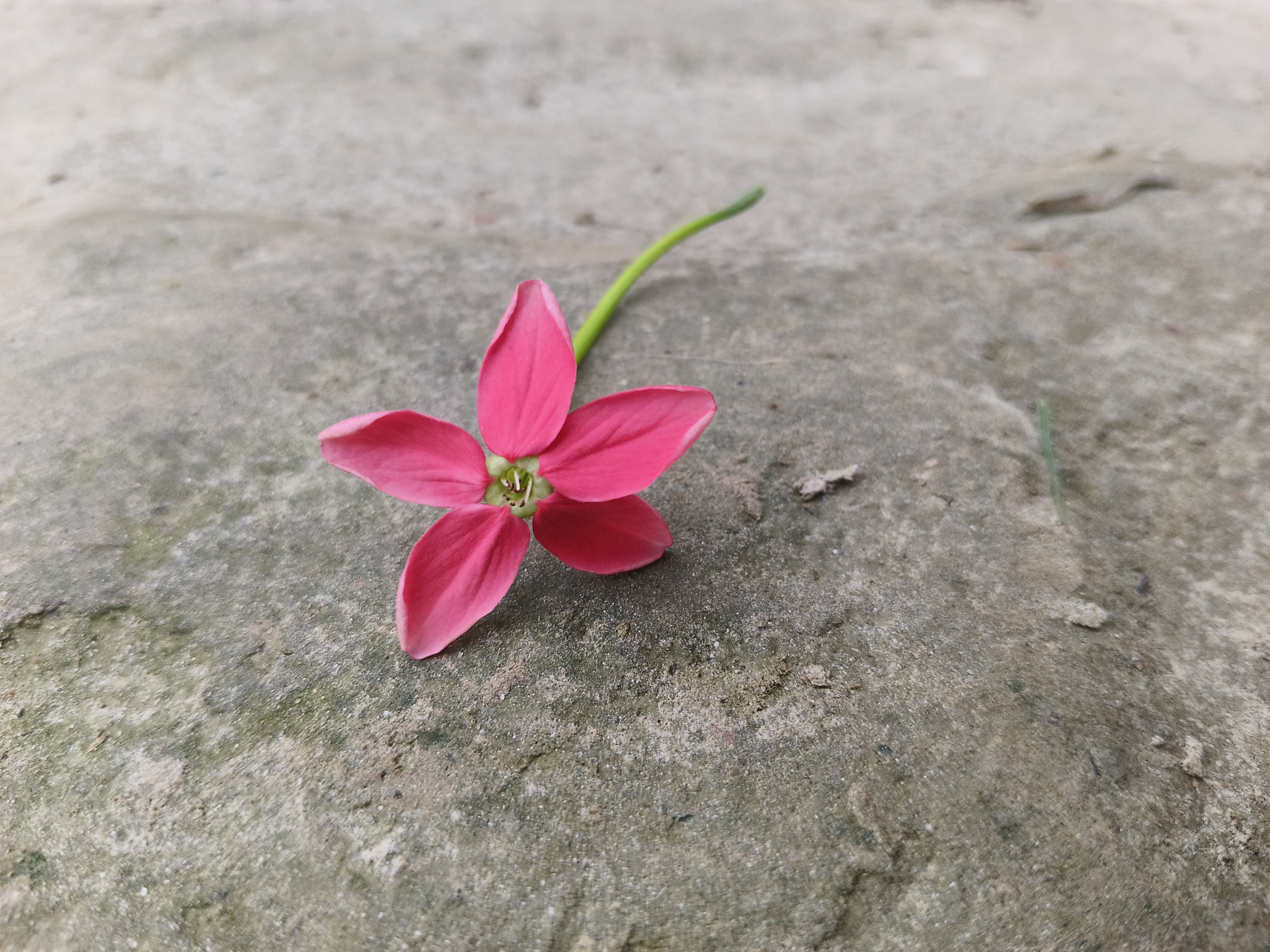
Rangoon creeper (Combretum indicum) — flower on soil

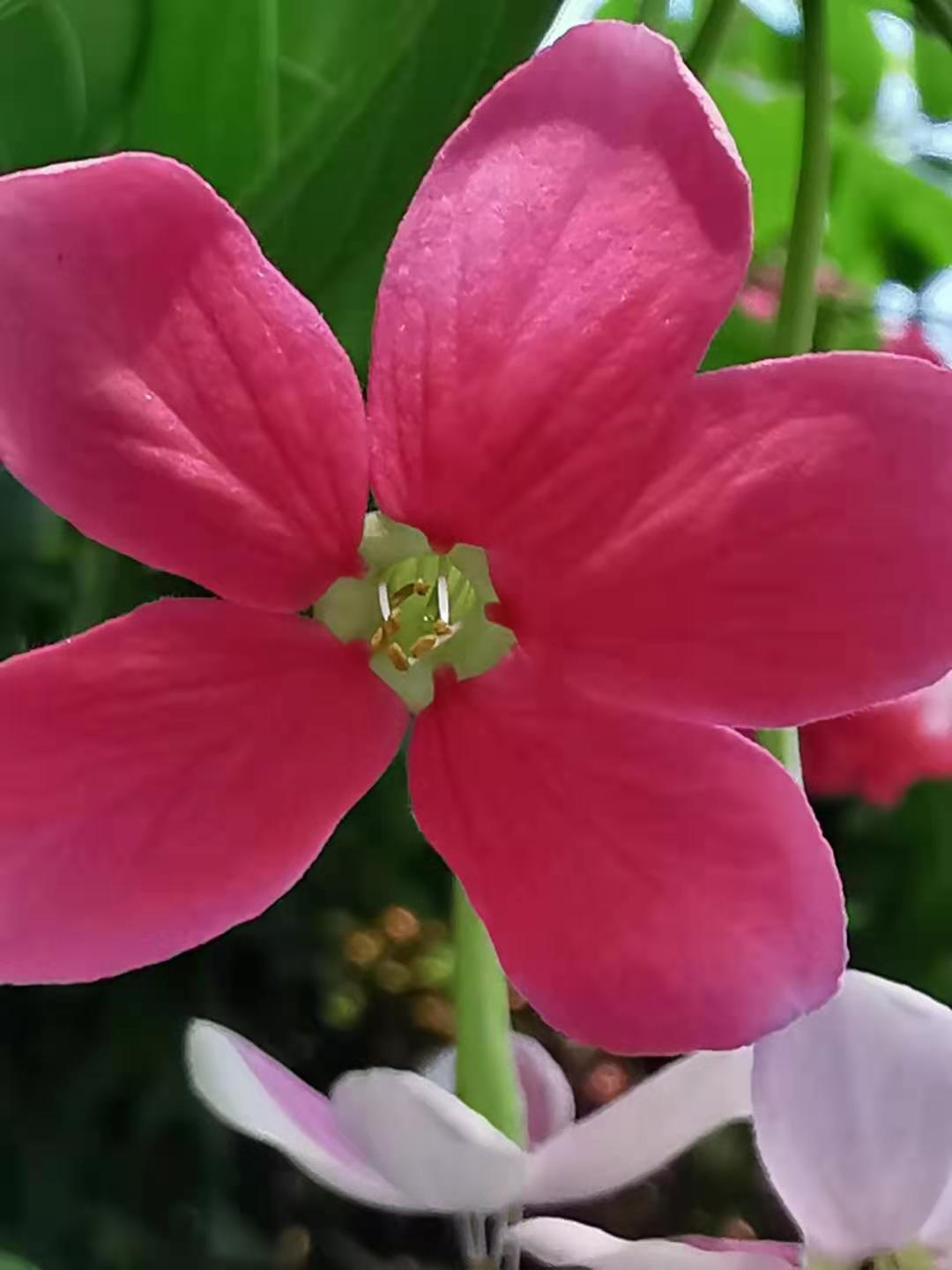
Flowers: small, cream calyx surrounded by large pink petals

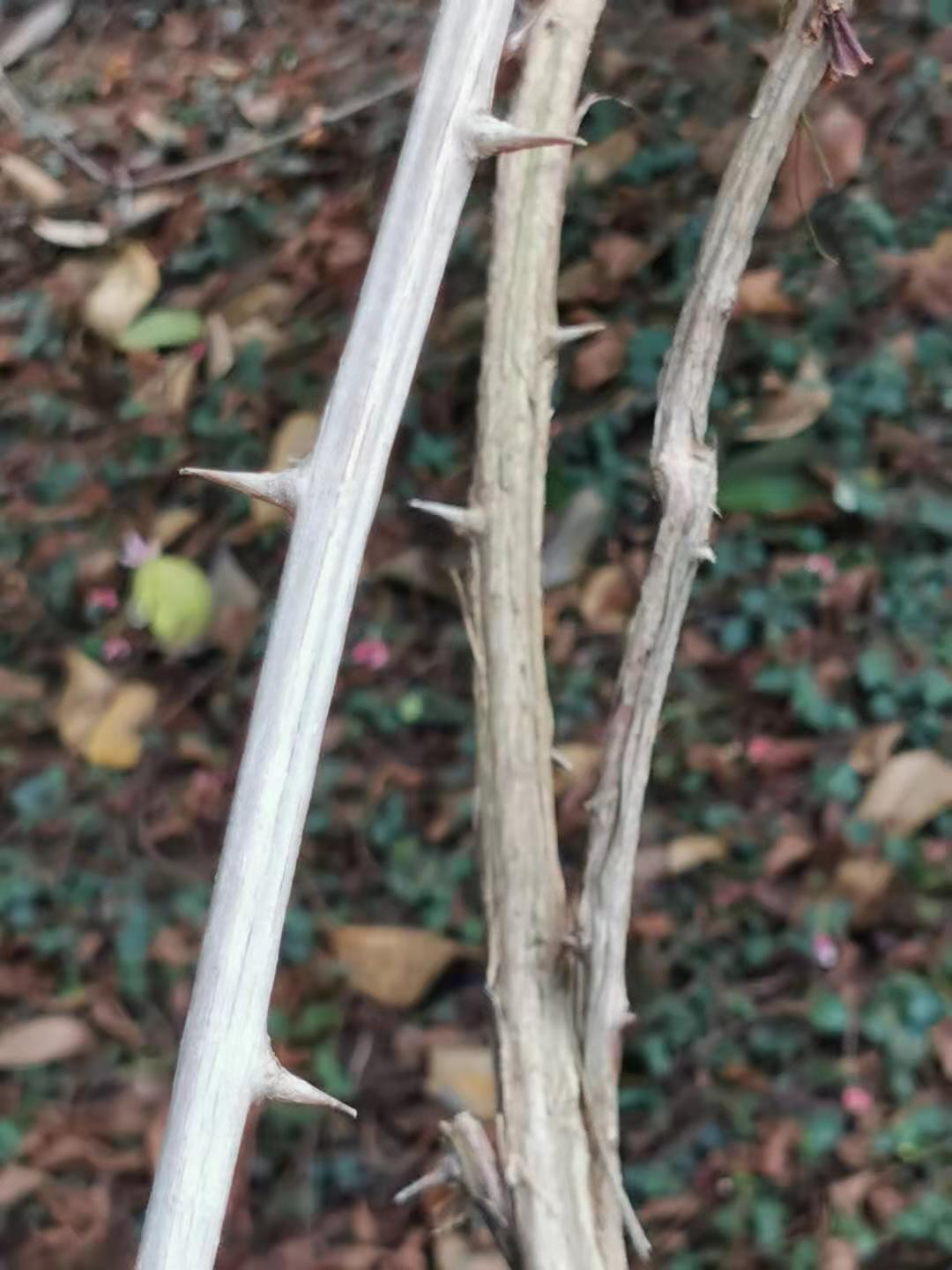
'Spines' derived from remnants of petioles

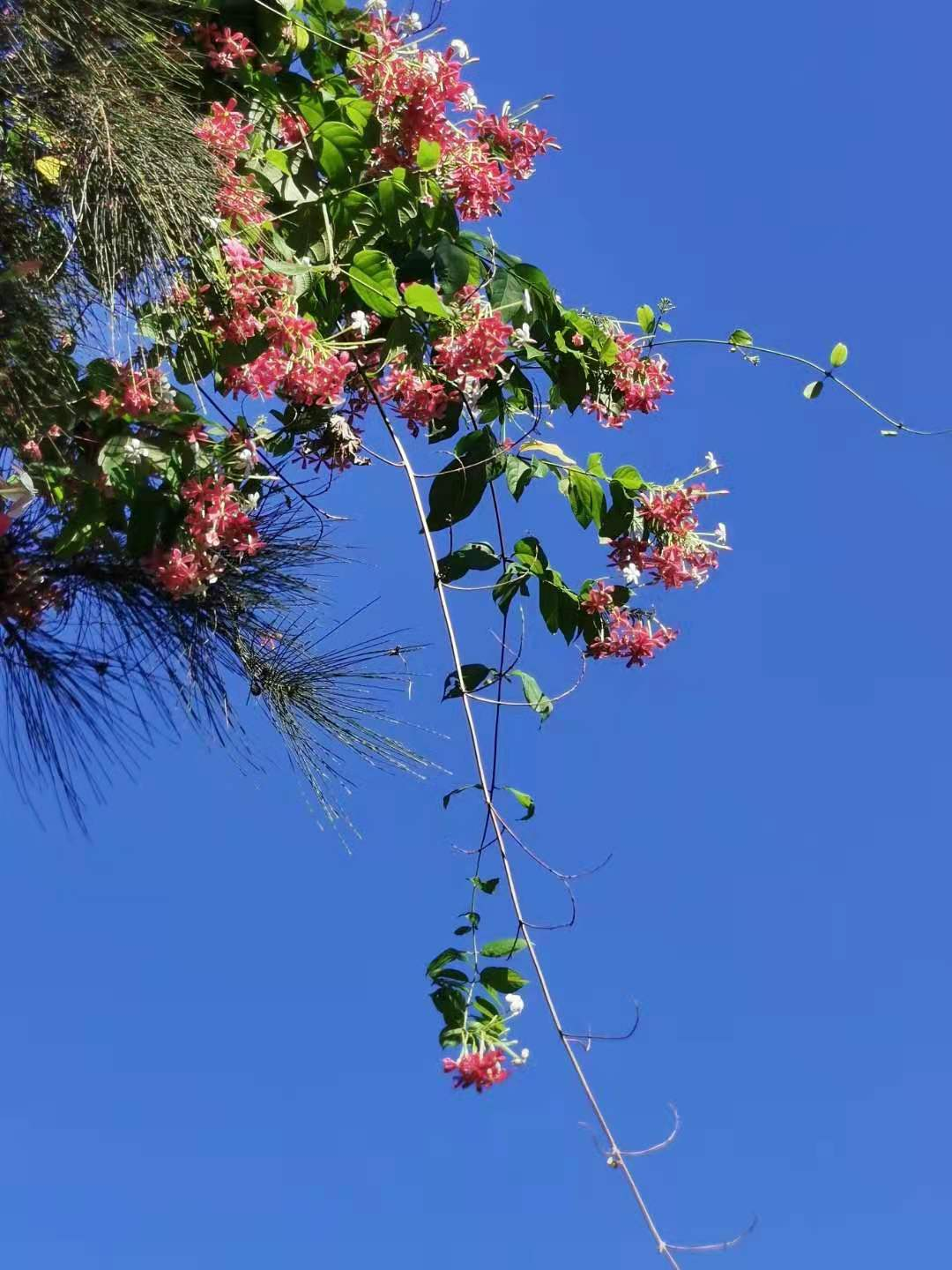
Climbing plant in flower

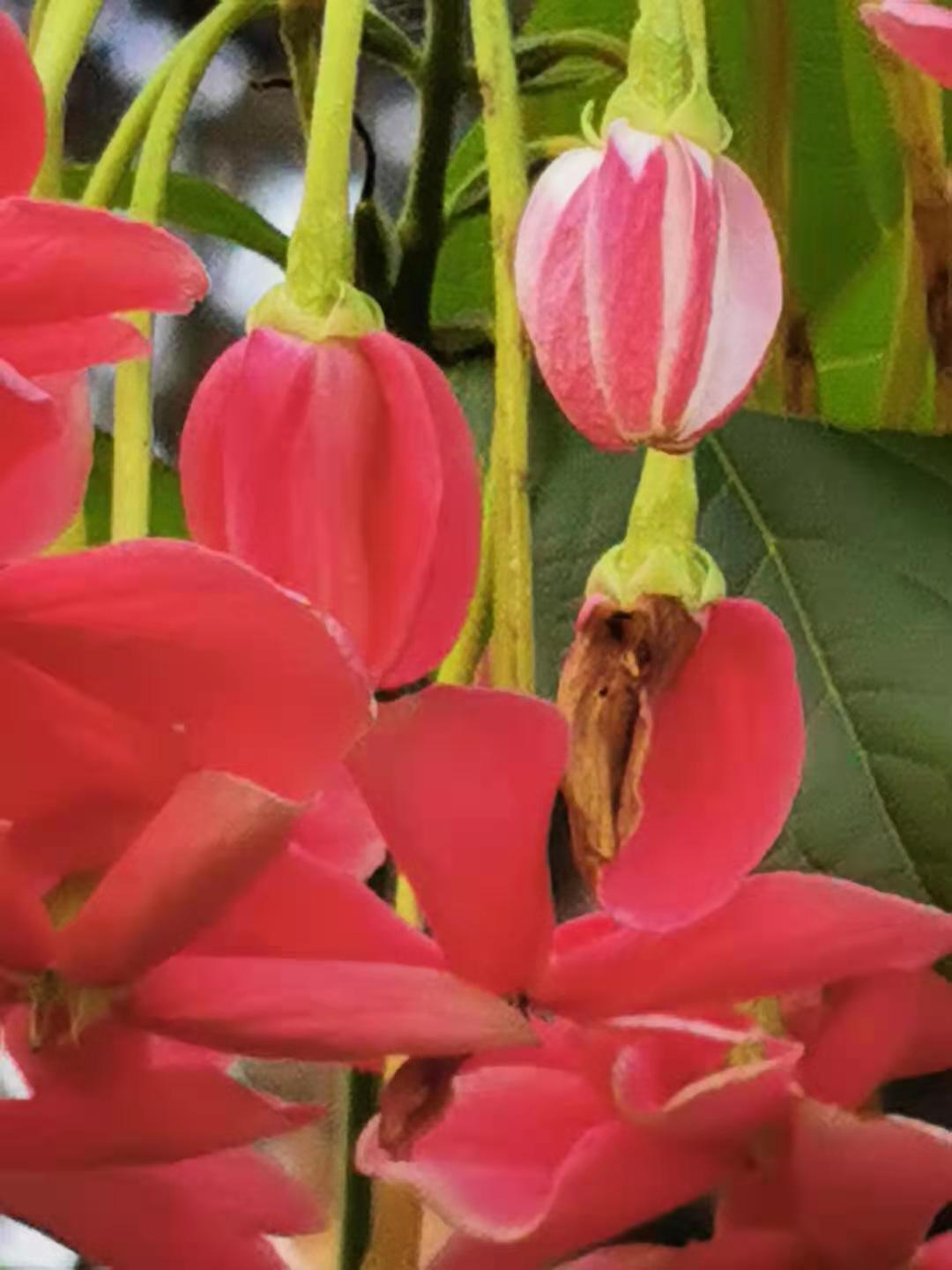
Bud shape

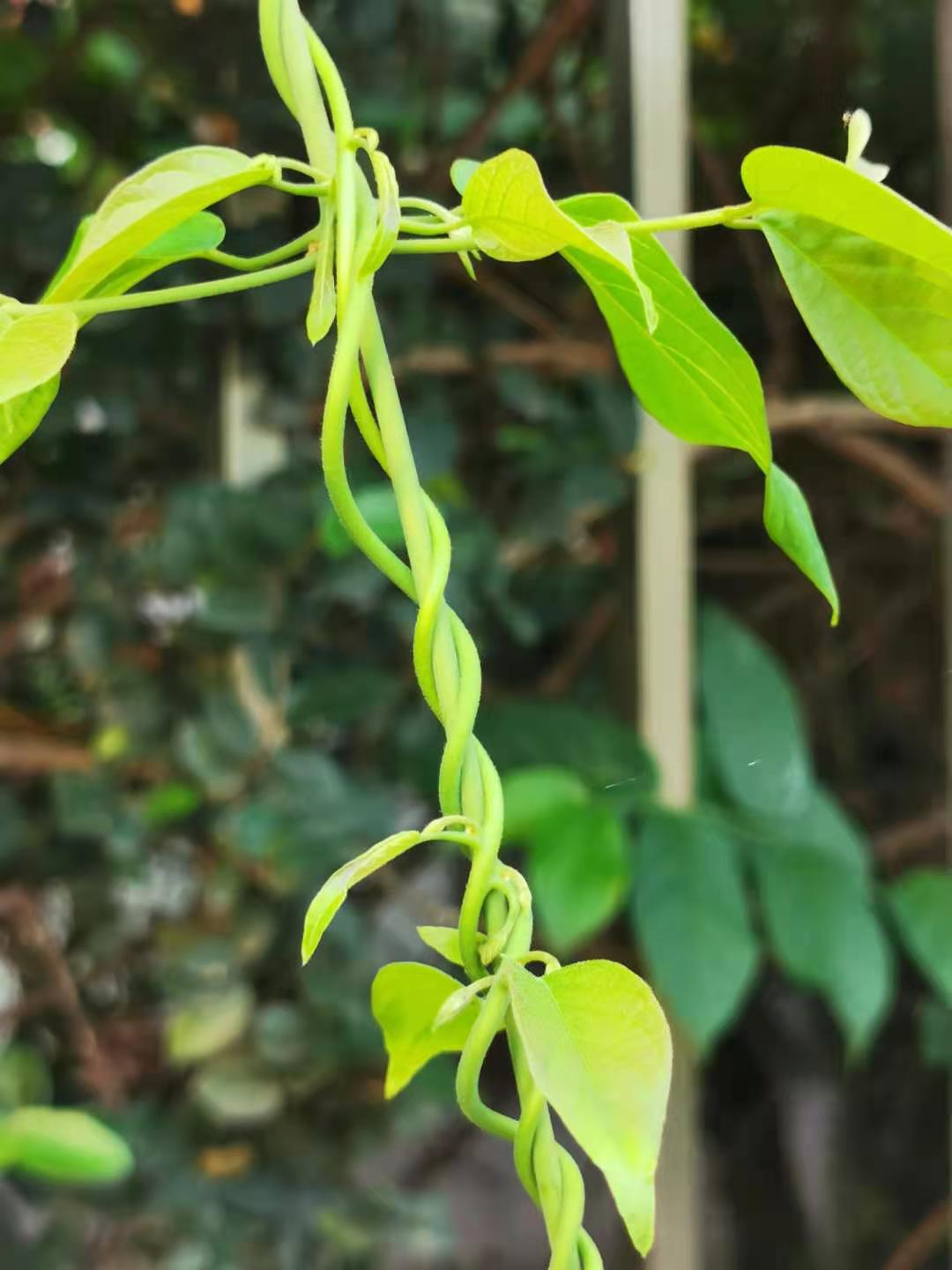
Foliage: the young leaves (not shown) are brown-tinted

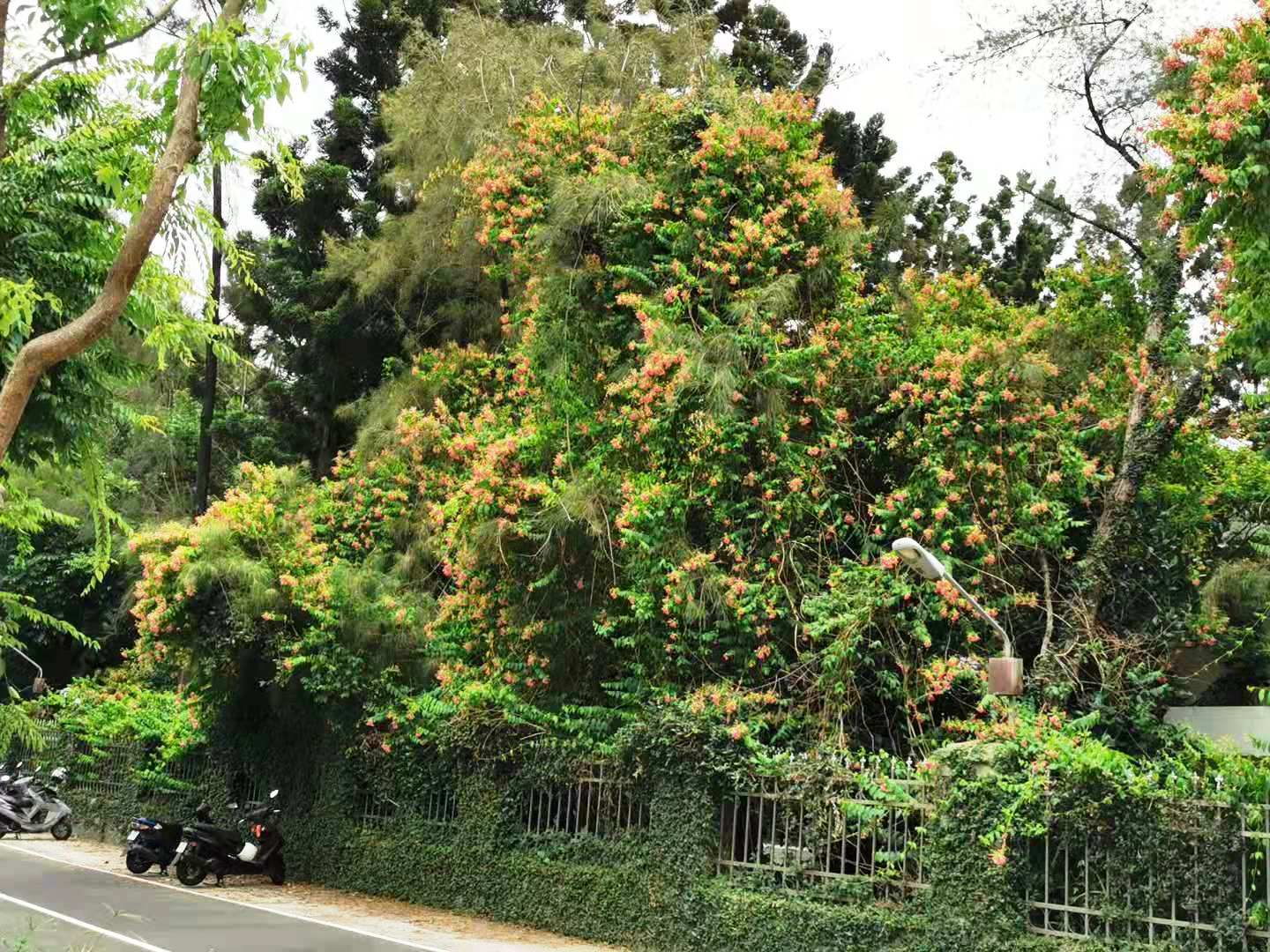
The vines twine round Casuarina equisetifolia for further growth support
