= Thomas and Ruckle Road =

Former California wagon road

The Thomas and Ruckle Road, also known as Ruckles Road or Ruckels Road, was a wagon road over the Blue Mountains.

George Thomas was a stagecoach driver who came west to California in 1849, before moving to Walla Walla. Colonel J. S. Ruckle arrived in Oregon in 1855 as a steam boat pilot for the Oregon Steam Navigation Company (OSN) along the Columbia River. Eventually Ruckle left the OSN and ran his own boat along the river. The two men planned and built the road in 1864 and 1865, as well as a stage line from Walla Walla to the Idaho Mines. The road ran from the northwest to the southeast, offering a more direct connection to Walla Walla, despite being longer than the Meacham Road.

The Ruckle Road, as well as others over the Blues, charged $3 to $5 per wagon. Several towns were platted along the road: Summerville in 1873, and Cove sometime in the 1870s. Mail was delivered over the road, causing it to bypass La Grande in favor of Union and Summerville, helping Union become elected as the county seat in 1872.

The road washed out in 1886 and was never rebuilt.
