= John Ivor Murray =

Scottish surgeon

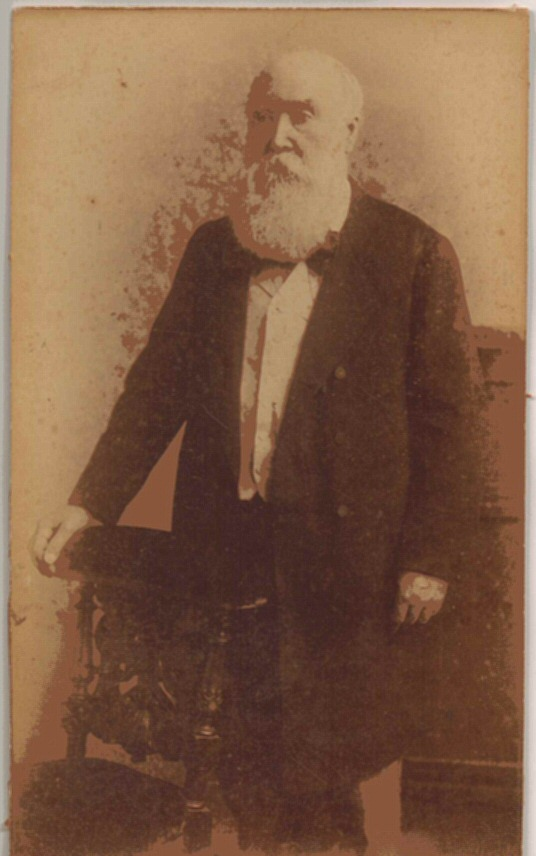
- Ivor Murray, explorer, collector and medical pioneer in China
- Born: 1824; Lasswade, Edinburgh
- Died: 24 July 1903 (aged 78–79); London
- Occupation: Surgeon
- Known for: President of British Balneological and Climatological Society

John Ivor Murray FRSE FRCSE (1824 – 24 July 1903), known as Ivor, was a Scottish surgeon who practised in China, Hong Kong and then in Sebastopol in the Crimean War. He was notably adventurous, travelling through Borneo, collecting for the Industrial Museum of Scotland, in Edinburgh (today's National Museum of Scotland), and serving on scientific expeditions to China. He was president of the British Balneological and Climatological Society in 1900.

== Life ==
Murray was born in Lasswade south of Edinburgh in 1824, the son of John Muray WS.

He went to school at the Lycée Saint Louis, Paris, France, and then returned to Scotland to study medicine at the University of Edinburgh. He became a licentiate of the Royal College of Surgeons of Edinburgh (LRCSE). Although he had won a commission as an army surgeon, as a prize in the military surgery class, there was no job available, so he travelled out to Canton, China, where he ran the hospital during a period of civil unrest in 1846.

Murray moved to Shanghai, China, where he ran a large practice with another pioneering physician, George Rogers Hall of Rhode Island. Together, Murray and Hall opened a seamen's hospital with beds for twelve patients in Shanghai in 1852. Hall was as adventurous as Murray: Hall went on to collect the first-ever shipment of Japanese plants to be sent to New England in 1861. Murray sent a large number of specimens that same year to the Museum of Economic Botany in Edinburgh, including

a seaweed resembling Corsican moss, used in Japan as an article of food; vegetable wax from Japan, with specimen of the fruit of the plant which yields it; ... seeds of 'vegetable cloth brush'; nuts of Quisqualis indica, used by the Chinese for worms .. taken every other day for three times.

Murray then moved to Hong Kong. In 1852 he paid for the first hospital for Europeans in Hong Kong. In 1854, on the outbreak of the Crimean War, he travelled directly to Sebastopol to work as a surgeon. He went on to assist in running the General Hospital at Balaclava. After travelling in Egypt, he returned to Scotland in 1856 to take his M.D. degree at Edinburgh, and became a Fellow of the Royal College of Surgeons of Edinburgh (FRCSE). In 1857 he was elected a Fellow of the Royal Society of Edinburgh his proposer being Andrew Douglas Maclagan. In 1858 he was elected a member of the Harveian Society of Edinburgh.

He was a notably effective colonial surgeon in Hong Kong from 1858 to 1872. During his time the death rate among the European population in Hong Kong fell from the alarmingly high rate of 7.52% (at which rate, half the population would die within 9 years) to 2.92% per year: the recorded reason is improved sanitation, though improved surgery and medicine may also have contributed. From 1868 he also served as inspector of hospitals. He was elected a Fellow of the Royal Society of Edinburgh in 1867.

Murray returned to Britain in 1872, intending to retire. However "owing to pecuniary losses" he had to start working again, and in 1875 moved to the seaside town of Scarborough, England, where he practised for fifteen years, retiring in 1890. He was a founder member and then president of the British Balneological and Climatological Society, which advocated the health benefits of bathing.

He died on 24 July 1903 at Addison Mansions in London.

== Family ==
On 6 February 1861, Ivor Murray married Margaret Agnes Alexander (1841–1911), younger sister of John Alexander, longtime chief clerk to Bow Street Police Court. He had nine children, four of them born in Hong Kong; at least two became doctors. He was a keen Freemason, becoming Junior Warden of the Grand Lodge of the North and East Ridings of Yorkshire, England.

== Publications ==
- Murray, John Ivor; Richards, John (1855). Notes of a Trip to Foo-choo-foo and the Surrounding Country: With Directions for Entering the River Min (22 pages). Printed at the 'Herald' Office.
- Murray, John Ivor; Cahill, Alexander Peile; Ballingall, George (1844). Catalogue of the Museum Attached to the Class of Military Surgery. University of Edinburgh.
