= Joseph S. Ruckle =

American politician

Colonel Joseph S. Ruckle (or Ruckel) was a businessman who moved to Oregon in 1855.

In Oregon, he captained Van Bergen's Oregon Steam Navigation Company steamship named the Fashion on the Columbia River. He then built his own boat, the Mountain Buck, and then a railroad portage. The rail portage, which was the Oregon Portage Railroad, was around the Cascades on the Columbia, and was the first railroad in Oregon.

Ruckle was elected state senator in 1858 over Clackamas and Wasco counties. A Democrat, he represented District 2, but as Oregon had not yet entered the Union, there was no official session in 1858. He only served during the 1859 special session, the first meeting of the state legislature.

In 1864 and 1865, he and George Thomas built the Thomas and Ruckle Road over the Blue Mountains. He also developed a quartz mine near Powder River that became known as the Virtue Mine.
