= Robinson Thwaites =

Mill owner (1807–1884)

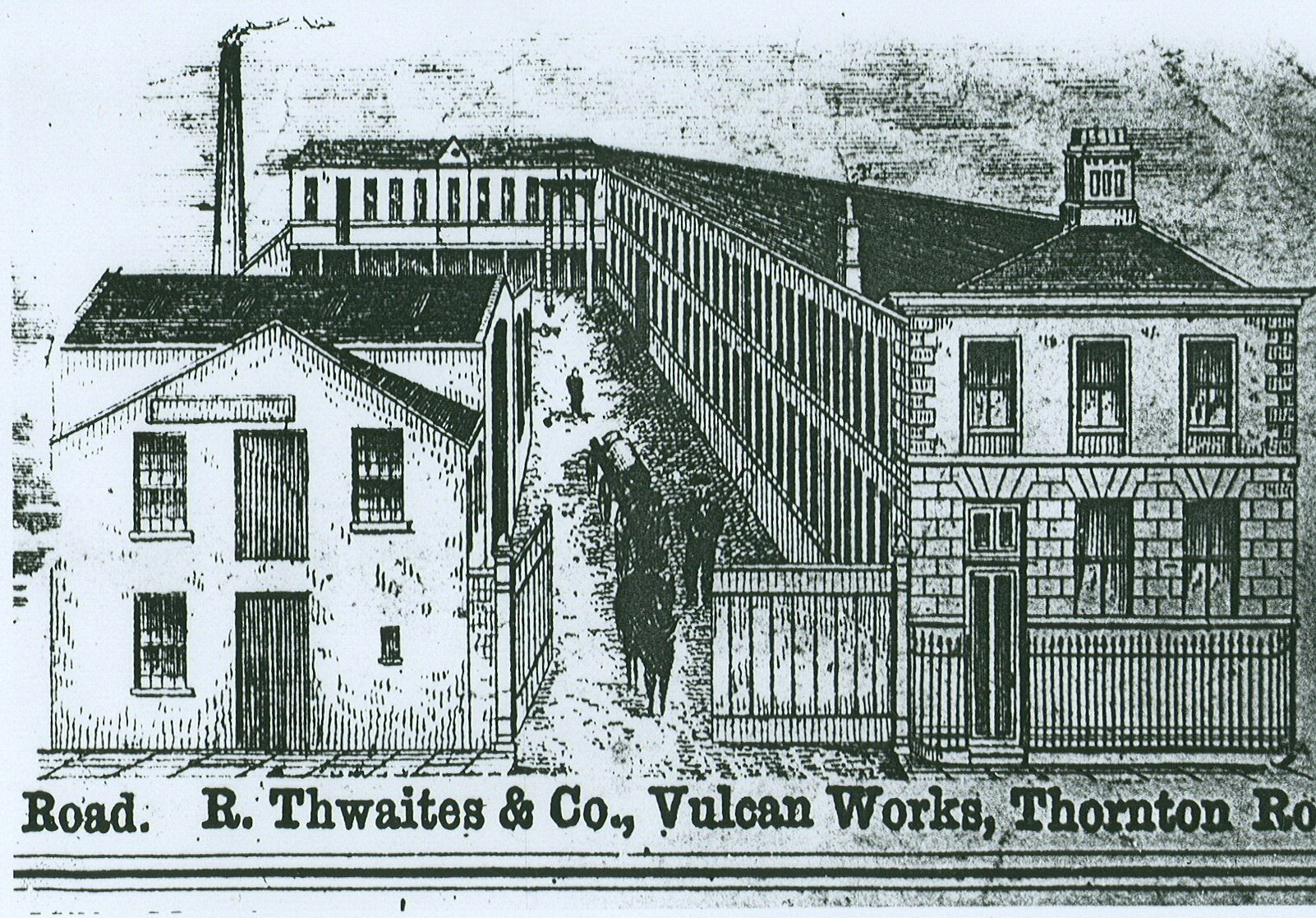
- R. Thwaites and Co's Vulcan Works at Thornton Road, Bradford, 1858
- Born: 1807; Horton, Bradford
- Died: 22 October 1884 (aged 76–77); Bradford
- Occupations: Mechanical engineer, company director
- Employer(s): Thwaites and Carbutt
- Spouse: Anna Hirst (c. 1821 – 1880)
- Children: Thomas, Mary, Anna, William, Eliza, Arthur, Edward, John, Albert
- Parents: Thomas Thwaites (1784/5 – 7 April 1869) (father); Hannah Hammond (c. 1773 – 1851) (mother)

Robinson Thwaites (1807 – 22 October 1884) was a nineteenth-century mechanical engineer and mill-owner in Bradford, Yorkshire. His companies included at different times Robinson Thwaites and Co, Thwaites and Carbutt and Thwaites Brothers.

== Companies ==
Robinson Thwaites' father Thomas was a master plumber. Robinson trained as a plumber to follow in his father's business, and started to practice as a plumber.

But instead, by 1848 he founded the Vulcan Iron Works at Bradford, as shown in an 1858 lithograph in the Illustrated Commerce Guide. His firm, Robinson Thwaites and Co, later (1862) in partnership with Edward Carbutt as Thwaites and Carbutt, and (in 1880) Thwaites Brothers, acquired a high reputation for its machinery used in the production and manufacture of iron and Bessemer process steel.

Robinson Thwaites and Co grew from a firm of "3 seniors, 50 men and 6 boys" in 1851 to "130 men and 13 boys" (as Thwaites and Carbutt) by 1871. Thwaites Brothers continued in production until at least 1914.

== Products and patents ==
In 1862, Thwaites and Carbutt exhibited a selection of machine tools at the London Exhibition. These included a seven hundredweight double-action self-acting steam hammer; a four hundredweight double-action single standard hammer; a pillar radial drilling machine; a six-inch centre slide and screw cutting lathe; a "very powerful" planing machine; and a ten-inch centre double-geared slide lathe.

In 1866, Thwaites and Carbutt Vulcan Works manufactured three locomotives "of 0-6-0 type" for Boulton.

In 1869, Thwaites and Carbutt supplied the engines for a reversing rolling mill at Landore steel works.

In 1877 Thwaites and Carbutt supplied a rolling mill engine (see illustration) for the Eston Ironworks of Bolckow Vaughan and Co. It had a 36-inch (91.44 cm) bore, and a 54-inch (137.16 cm) stroke. That same year, the firm produced a coke crusher to prepare carbon for ironmaking.

The pioneering engineering work of Thwaites and his partners is evident from the numerous patents they took out. One was for improvements to steam hammers.

Another patent, taken out by Robinson's son William Henry Thwaites in 1877 with help from Edward Carbutt was for mine ventilation equipment, as installed at Chilton Colliery (see illustration). The Roots ventilator had two 25 foot diameter rotary pistons, each 13 foot wide. They were driven by a steam engine whose cylinders had a 28-inch diameter and a 48-inch stroke. The firm exhibited an "air blowing machine" at the St Petersburg Exhibition of New and Improved Mechanisms, Devices and Tools in 1875, alongside a similar one by Roots.

In 1891, Scientific American published "illustrations of a Thwaites suspension pneumatic power 1/2 cwt. hammer of a new design, for planishing pipes and plates, for which we are indebted to Engineering [magazine]". The machine could deliver "500 blows per minute".

In 1893, the foundry at the Consett Iron Works was using a Roots blower made by Thwaites Brothers.

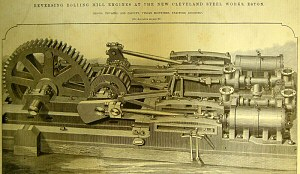
Thwaites and Carbutt Rolling Mill for Bolckow Vaughan's Eston Ironworks, 1877

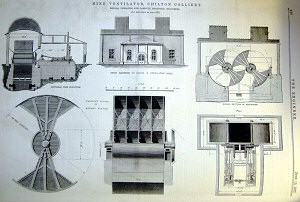
Thwaites and Carbutt Mine Ventilator, 1877

== Family firm ==
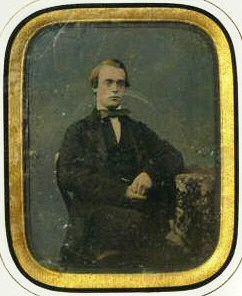
Ambrotype of William Henry Thwaites, c. 1875

Thwaites' work as a mechanical engineer was continued by three of his sons, Thomas Hirst Thwaites, Arthur Hirst Thwaites, and Edward Hirst Thwaites, all of whom became engineers in the firm.

A fourth son who also worked at the Vulcan Iron Works, William Henry Thwaites, married Mary Ann Stuttard of Colne, Lancashire on 23 October 1879, but died in 1882 aged 32.

From being purely a family firm, Thwaites Brothers had a professional managing director by 1895, Arthur Devonshire Ellis.

Thwaites Brothers were still in business as Engineers in 1914, continuing to make steam hammers, "Roots' blowers" (to ventilate mines) and assorted foundry equipment.

Thwaites' eldest daughter, Mary Elizabeth Thwaites, married the Chief Clerk to Bow Street Magistrates' Court, John Alexander.
