= Oregon Portage Railroad =

Coordinates: 45°39′03″N 121°54′45″W

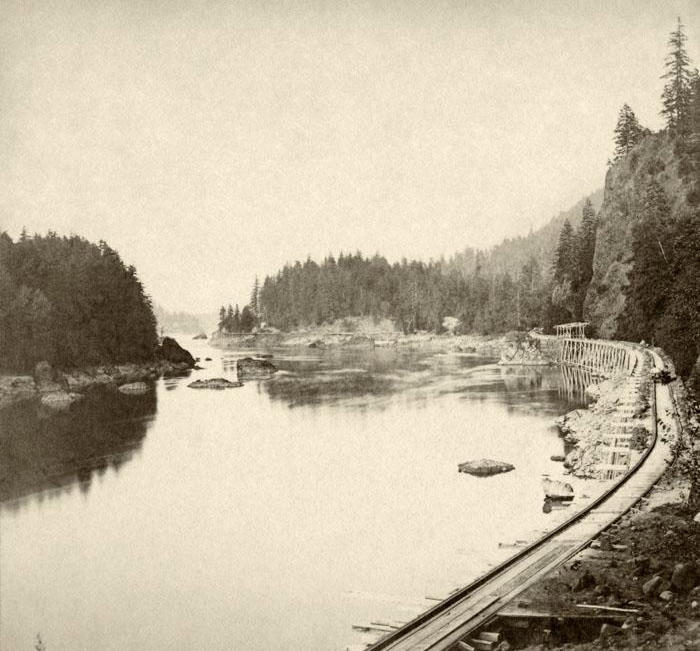

Overview
- Locale: South bank of the Cascades canal near the Columbia River, from near Bonneville Dam and Tanner Creek to Cascade Locks
- Dates of operation: 1858–1896

Technical
- Track gauge: 3 ft (914 mm)
- Previous gauge: 5 ft (1,524 mm)
- Length: 4.5 mi (7.2 km); Later extended to 15 mi (24 km)

The Oregon Portage Railroad was the first railroad in the U.S. state of Oregon. It was located on the south bank of the Cascades canal of the Columbia River.

The railroad originally ran 4.5 miles (7.2 km) from Tanner Creek (near where Bonneville Dam was later built) to the Cascade Locks, which were under construction in the later years of the railroad's operation. It was later extended to a length of 15 miles (24 km).

Although the Oregon Portage was the first railroad in Oregon, it was not the first along the Columbia River. Francis A. Chenoweth operated a rail line on the river's north bank in present-day Washington in 1851.

== History ==
In 1861, John W. Brazee of the Oregon Portage Company started to build a 5 ft (1,524 mm) broad gauge railroad out of a mule-and-wagon road that had been constructed by Col. Joseph S. Ruckle and Harrison Olmstead in 1856 but had been out of service since around 1858. Brazee's conversion of the road cost $50,000 USD (equivalent to $1,791,667 in 2025), and the line opened on May 20, 1861, still relying on mule power. After one more year, the portage company acquired the Oregon Pony, which became the first locomotive in the Pacific Northwest, debuting for the railroad on May 10, 1862.

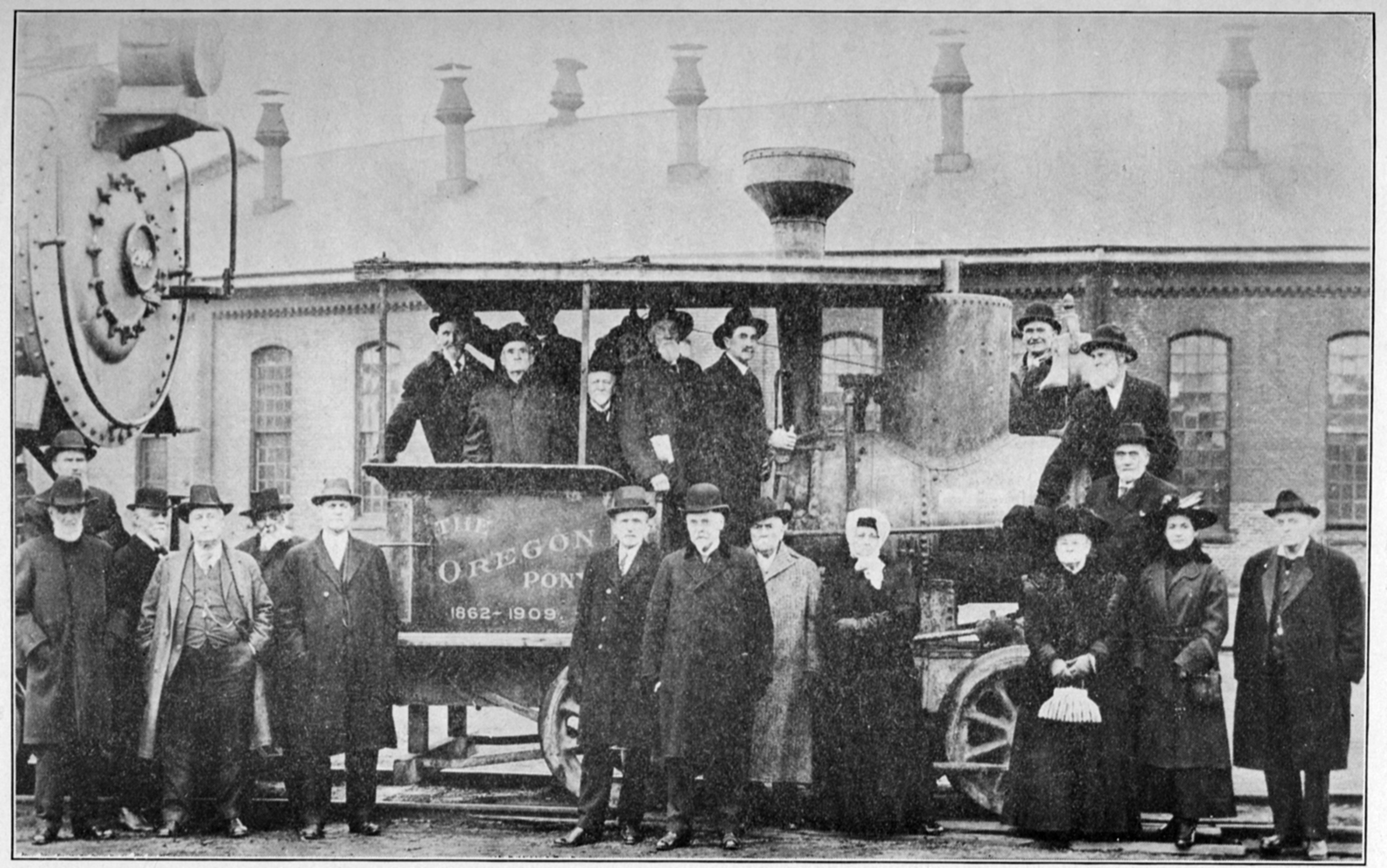
A group of Oregon Pioneers photographed December 31, 1915, with the Pony locomotive.

The Oregon Portage Railroad was operated by the Oregon Steam Navigation Company, which sold the railroad for $155,000 around the year 1880 (equivalent to $5,171,121 in 2025) as part of the company's sale to the Oregon Railroad and Navigation Company.

Restoration of the railroad in 1891, including a conversion to the 3 ft (914 mm) narrow gauge, was a result of demands from steamboat captains and delays in the construction of the Cascades Locks and Canal. Steamboat captains had voiced concerns because they needed to transport goods and passengers past the Cascades Rapids and were disappointed with the quality of the Cascades Railroad. Once the locks were completed in 1896, however, demand for the Oregon Portage Railroad decreased.

== See also ==
- Henry Villard
- Steamboats of the Columbia River: Railway completion forces steamboats off routes
