= Vulcan Iron Works =

Name of several iron foundries

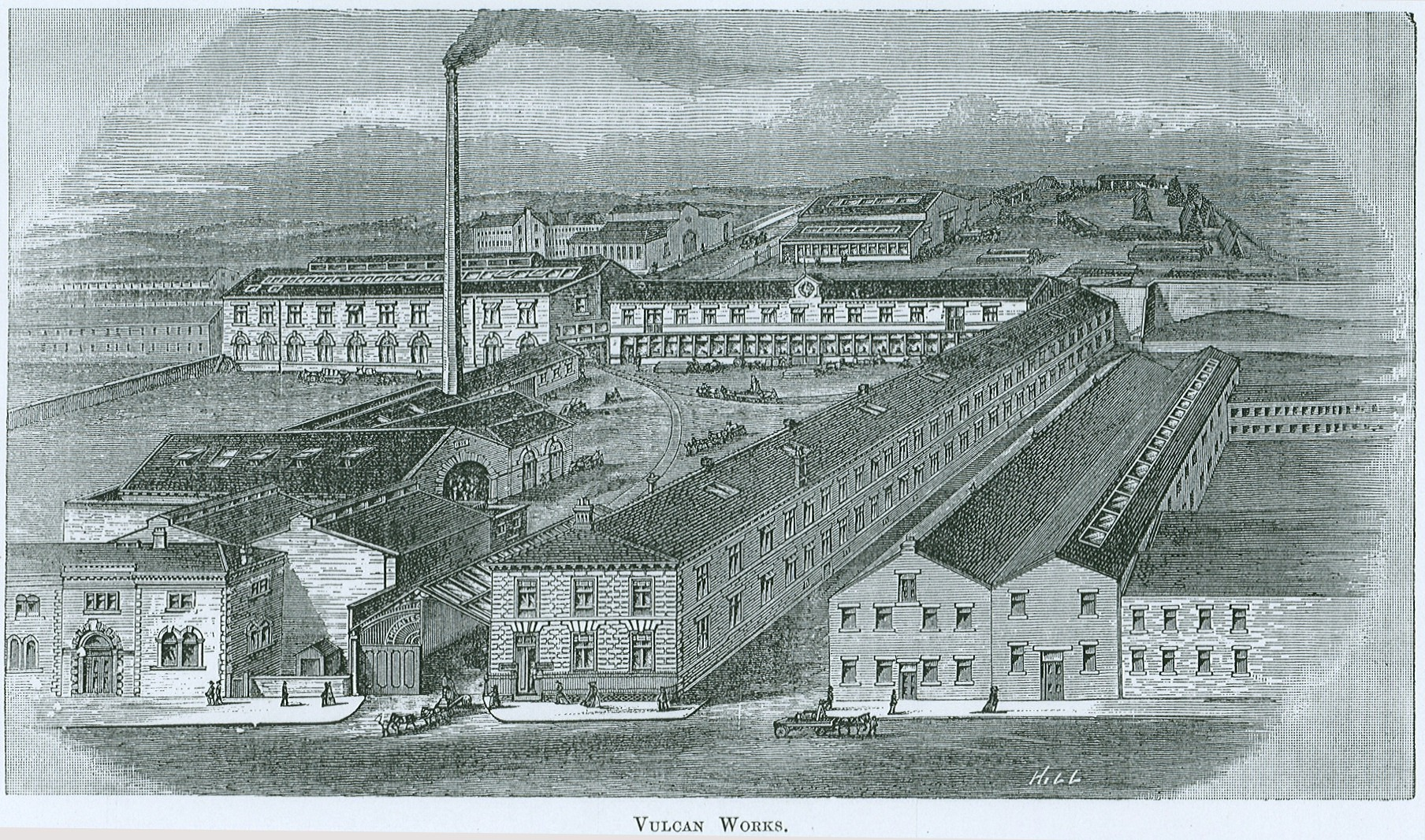
Vulcan Works, Thornton Road, Bradford, ca 1888, founded by Robinson Thwaites, was one of several Victorian era iron mills sharing the name; like many others, it made a wide variety of machinery including mining equipment and locomotives

Vulcan Iron Works was the name of several iron foundries in both England and the United States during the Industrial Revolution and, in one case, lasting until the mid-20th century. Vulcan, the Roman god of fire and smithery, was a popular namesake for these foundries.

== England ==
During the Industrial Revolution, numerous entrepreneurs independently founded factories named Vulcan Iron Works in England, notably that of Robinson Thwaites and Edward Carbutt at Bradford, and that of Thomas Clunes at Worcester, England. The largest of all the ironworks of Victorian England, the Cleveland Works of Bolckow Vaughan in Middlesbrough, were on Vulcan Street.

=== Thwaites & Carbutt, Bradford ===
The Vulcan Works at Thornton Road, Bradford was a spacious and handsome factory. It was described in Industries of Yorkshire as

the largest of their kind in Bradford, and the centre and headquarters of an industry of magnificent dimensions and condition throughout. The works cover about four acres of ground ... The buildings are all of stone, and the mechanical equipment could not be surpassed in efficacy at the present day, for it includes the latest and best improvements in all kinds of apparatus that can be advantageously brought to bear upon such an industry as that here engaged in. The working staff numbers about 200 men; and the perfection of order and system prevails in each and every department.

=== Ley's, Derby ===
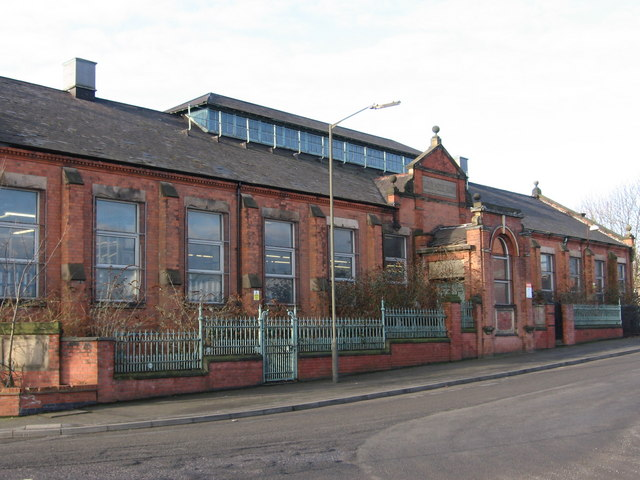
The mess room for Ley's Malleable Castings in Colombo Street, Derby

The Vulcan Iron Works at Osmaston Road, Derby was founded in 1874 by Francis Ley (1846-1916). On a site occupying 11 acres by the Birmingham and Derby Junction Railway, he manufactured castings for motor cars. The company became the Ley's Malleable Castings Company Ltd. In the London Gazette of April 14, 1876, Ley was granted a patent for "improvements in apparatus for locking and fastening nuts on fish plate and other bolts". The iron foundry was closed and demolished in 1986.

=== McKenzie, Clunes & Holland, Worcester ===
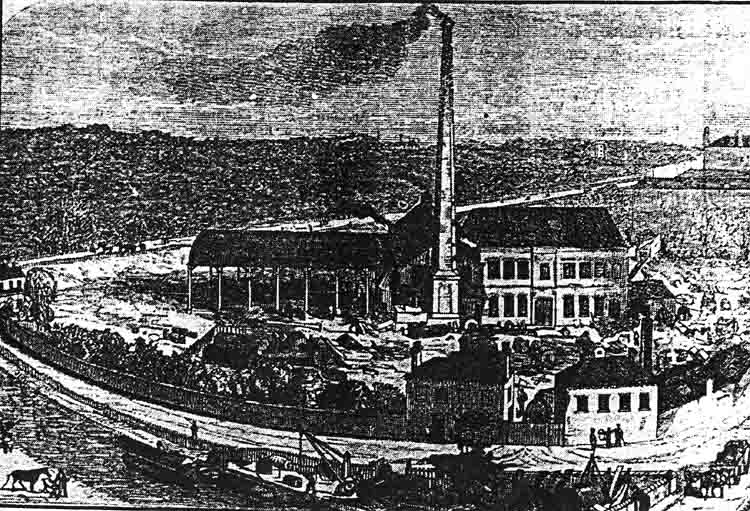
Vulcan Iron Works, Worcester, founded by Thomas Clunes

The Vulcan Iron Works at Cromwell Street, Worcester was founded in 1857 by Thomas Clunes (b. 1818, d. 28 September 1879). The firm started out as "Engineers, Millwrights, Iron & Brass Founders, Plumbers etc", according to the listing in Kelly's Directory. The works had a single tall tapering square chimney, a covered area with open sides, and a handsome main building on a largely open site on the west side of the Worcester and Birmingham Canal.

By 1861, Clunes, a former "Plumber and Brass Founder" from Aberdeen, Scotland living in St Martin's, Worcester, with nine children, was a "Master Engineer employing 104 men and 10 boys"; his son Robert at age 11 was an "Apprentice to Engineer". In 1861, Clunes was joined by two former railwaymen, McKenzie and Holland, and the firm moved into railway signalling equipment. Clunes retired to Fowey, Cornwall, and his name was dropped from the company's name in the 1870s. The entry in the Worcestershire Post Office Directory for 1876 is simply "RAILWAY SIGNAL MANFRS. McKenzie & Holland, Vulcan Iron Works, Worcester."

=== Vulcan Iron Works, Langley Mill ===
The G R Turner company's Vulcan Iron Works at Langley Mill, Derbyshire was built in 1874. G R Turner produced railway rolling stock until the 1960s; at its peak it employed 350 men. According to Grace's Guide, G R Turner was established in 1863; it became a Limited Company in 1902, and was registered on 29 January 1903 as acquiring T N Turner's business of "engineer, wheel and wagon maker"; in 1914 it was described as "Colliery Engineers" as well as making rolling stock, with 800 engineers.

=== Vulcan Ironworks, Preston ===
Gregson and Monk Engineers, Salter Street, Preston, in 1960

In 1857 the firm of Baxendale and Gregson was founded in Shepherd Street, Preston, Lancashire. When the works there became too small, the business moved to a new Vulcan Ironworks, built at Salter Street, just off North Road, Preston, under the name Gregson and Monk.

In 1873, James Gregson bought 82 acres of land at Fulwood; in 1876 he built Highgate Park mansion with the land as its extensive gardens. He owned much property in Preston and was a councillor of Fulwood District. His son George Frederick Gregson ran the firm after him.

When Monk retired in March 1874, James Gregson became sole proprietor. He employed about 400 men, making up to 100 weaving looms per week. Over 25,000 looms made by Gregson were claimed to be at work in or near Preston in 1884.

The machines made by the firm included:

Silk looms, circular and drop-box looms, fustian looms, Turkish towel looms, jacquard looms, dobby looms, Bradford looms, sheeting, linen and sailcloth looms, etc., for weaving all kinds of cotton, linen, worsted, silk, flax, hemp, jute, and woollen goods of various widths and strength—principally shirtings, jaconets, domestic tablecloths, twills, sheetings, counterpanes, checks, ginghams, quiltings, toilet cloths, handkerchiefs, Turkish towels, fustians, nankeens, cotton velvets, bedticks, cambrics, drapers, hucks, damask, towels, &c. Also all kinds of preparing machinery, viz., slasher sizing machines, pirning machines, beaming machines, cloth folding and measuring machines, hydraulic cloth presses, steam drying machines, &c.

The ironworks was reported in 1884 to have grindstones of 7 ft (2 metre) diameter; "two cupolas blown by fans, one of which is capable of melting twenty tons of metal per day"; cranes and hoists; a brass moulding shop; a sand mill (for the mouldings); and a machine for grinding coal to dust. The buildings included a draughtsmen's office; a pattern makers' and joiners' shop; a packing room; an erecting and turning shop; and a smithy. All the machines were driven by rope from a single large wheel; two horizontal steam engines powered the entire ironworks. The journalist noted that "The death rate among grinders is very high indeed, which it is almost impossible to prevent."

== United States ==
=== Seattle ===
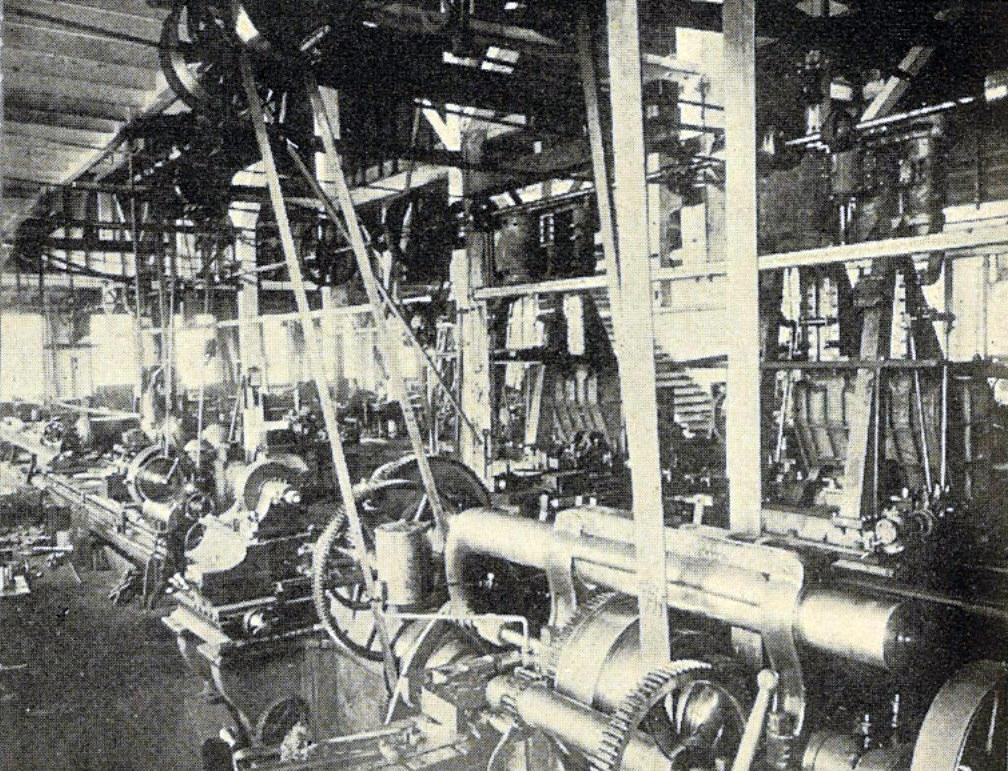
Vulcan Iron Works, Seattle, 1900.

The Vulcan Iron Works in Seattle had Jacob Furth as its president. Furth ran the Vulcan Iron Works along with the Puget Sound Electric Railway and street railways on the Puget Sound.

=== San Francisco ===
A Vulcan Iron Works was established at 135 Fremont Street, San Francisco in 1850 during the California gold rush. The factory occupied the block bounded by Fremont, Mission, Howard, and First Streets. The factory maintained the name through a number of owners building boilers, steam engines, mining machinery, sawmills, and some relatively primitive steam locomotives for 19th century California railroads. It built the Oregon Pony in 1861. The factory was destroyed by the 1906 San Francisco earthquake, but steel fabrication activities resumed on the site after the quake.

=== Charleston ===
There was a Vulcan Iron Works on Cumberland Street, Charleston, South Carolina in 1865.

== See also ==
- Vulcan (motor vehicles)
