= Nematode infection =

- Deaths due to intestinal nematode infections per million persons in 2012 0-0 1-1 2-2
- Specialty: Infectious diseases, helminthology

A nematode infection is a type of helminthiasis caused by organisms in the nematode phylum.

An example is enterobiasis. Several antinematodal agents are available.
