= Oregon Steam Navigation Company =

Transportation company

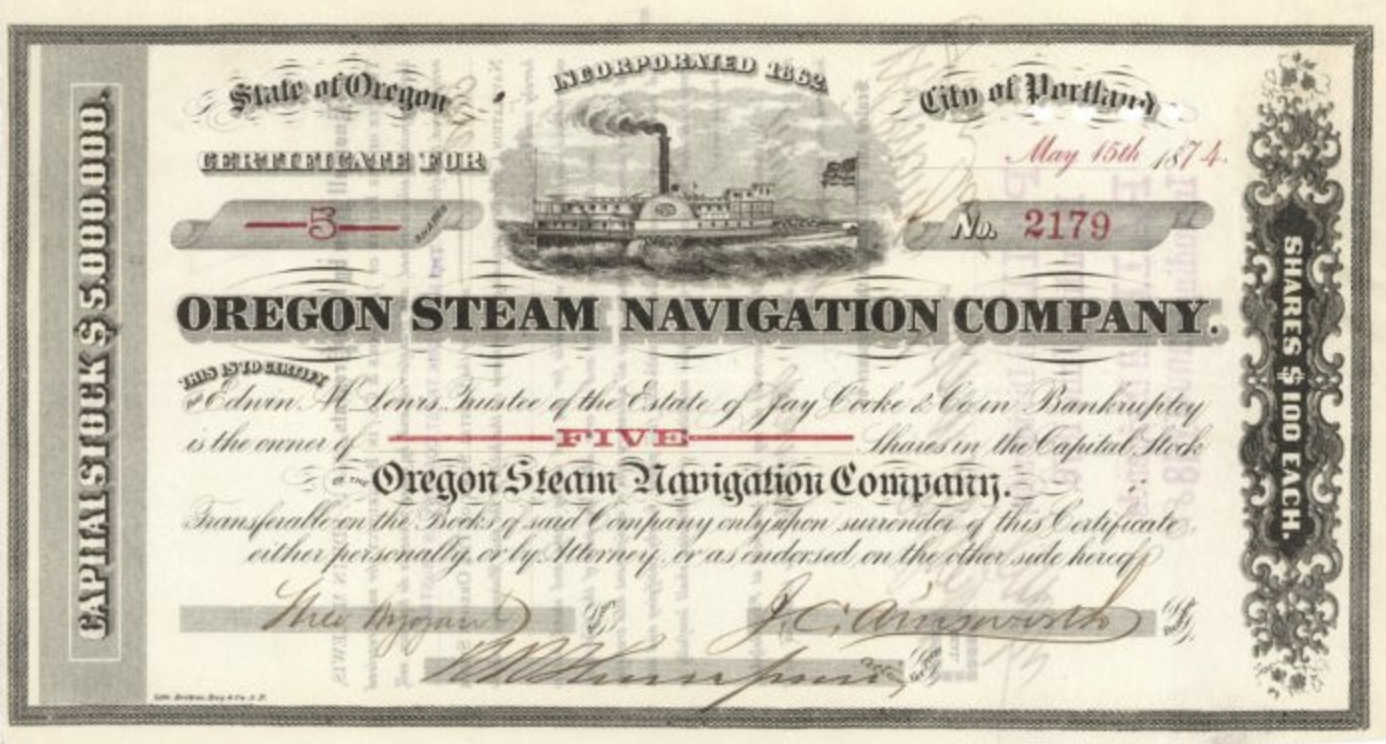
- Founded: 1860
- Defunct: 1879
- Fate: stock bought by Oregon Railway and Navigation Company
- Successor: Oregon Railway and Navigation Company
- Headquarters: Portland, Oregon

The Oregon Steam Navigation Company (O.S.N.) was an American company incorporated in 1860 in Washington with partners J. S. Ruckle, Henry Olmstead, and J. O. Van Bergen. It was incorporated in Washington because of a lack of corporate laws in Oregon, though it paid Oregon taxes.

The company operated steamships between San Francisco and ports along the Columbia River at Astoria, Portland and The Dalles, serving the lumber and salmon fishing industries. A railroad was built to serve the steamship industry.

== Formation of the monopoly ==
The company was incorporated on December 29, 1860, at Vancouver, Washington, with 22 shareholders. Principal shareholders included D. F. Bradford (one of the owners of the north bank portage railway at the Cascades), Jacob Kamm, Harrison Olmstead, Simeon G. Reed, R. R. Thompson, and steamboat captains John C. Ainsworth and L. W. Coe. The company then gained control over most of the boats on the Columbia and Snake rivers.

Timmen described the Oregon Steam Navigation Company as "the many-tentacled monopoly of river transportation."

From 1858 to 1863, the Oregon Portage Railroad operated 4.5 miles of track between Bonneville and Cascade. The railroad hauled primarily military and immigrant traffic. In 1862, the railroad was sold to the Oregon Railway and Navigation Company for $155,000.

Soon afterwards, the company acquired most of the steamboats on the Columbia and Snake Rivers. The Oregon Railway and Navigation Company purchased the Oregon Steam Navigation Company in 1879.

- On the lower Columbia, the company's boats included Senorita, Fashion (ex-James P. Flint), Julia (Barclay), Belle (of Oregon City), Mountain Buck, and Carrie Ladd.
- On the middle Columbia, boats were Mary, Hassaloe, Wasco, and Idaho.
- On the upper Columbia, the company ran the Tenino and the Colonel Wright.

== Competitors bought off ==
In 1862, river transport concerns not involved with the Oregon Steam Navigation Company formed the People's Transportation Company. The new competitor put the E.D. Baker on the lower Columbia, the Iris on the middle, and the Kiyus on the upper Cascades. These boats posed serious competition to the monopoly, so much so that in about 1864, the Oregon Steam Navigation Company paid its rival $10,000 a year to confine its operations to the Willamette River. Oregon Steam Navigation Company also picked up People's Transportation's boats Iris and Kiyus, in exchange for three OSN boats on the Willamette River, Onward, Rival, and Surprise.

== Expansion of fleet ==
Traffic increased in the early 1860s, so in 1863 and 1864, OSN added the Nez Perce Chief, the Webfoot, the Owyhee and the Yakima, all built at Celilo on the upper Columbia, and the Mississippi-style side-wheeler Oneonta on the middle river. OSN also purchased the side-wheeler New World to work the lower Columbia. By 1878, OSN had added to its fleet the sternwheelers Harvest Queen, John Gates, Spokane, Annie Faxon, Mountain Queen, R.R. Thompson, and Wide West.

== Struggle for the portages ==
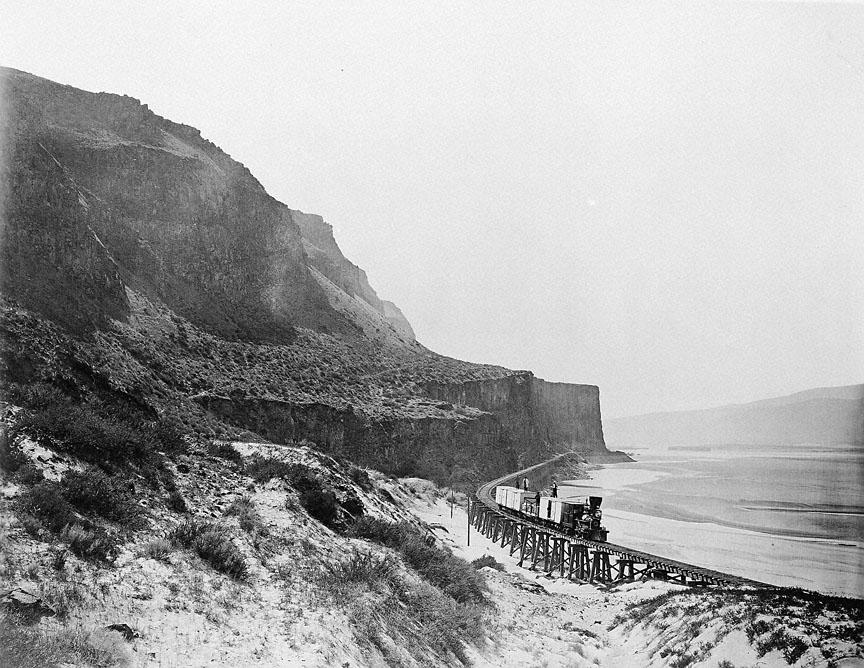
The Dalles-Celilo portage railroad in 1867 looking west towards "Cape Horn".

Control of the portages was critical to control of the river. OSN controlled all the portages, including both the north and the south portage railways around the Cascades (which had once been in competition with each other) as well as a portage system that had been built around Celilo Falls by one Orlando Humason. In 1863, the company replaced the mule-drawn portage railway on the north side of the Cascades with a steam locomotive. The company also built a 13-mile (21 km) steam railway from the Dalles around Celilo Falls, which opened on April 23, 1863, and cost $1 million to build.

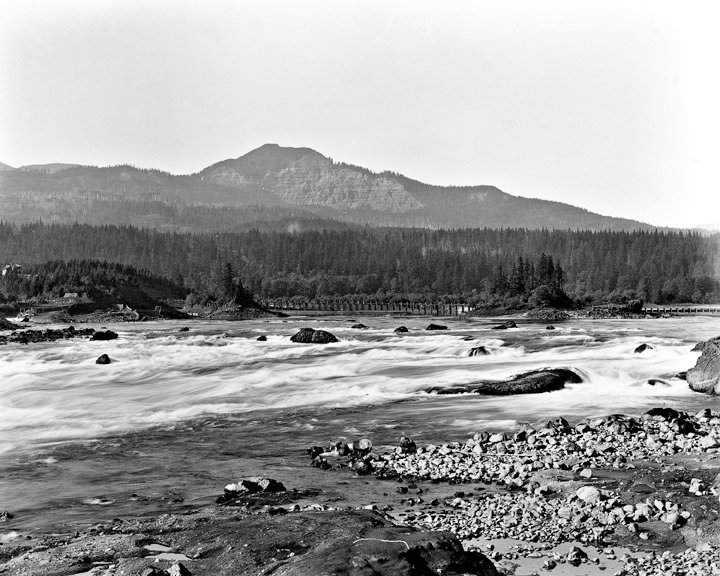
Cascades of the Columbia

- Cascade Portage and railroad, Washington side, 1867
- Oregon "Pony," first steam engine in Oregon, used on portage railroad

== Competition ==
The People's Transportation Company was organized in 1862 to compete with the Oregon Steam Navigation Company. The company then began a rate war with the O.S.N. People's Transportation was so successful that O.S.N. bought them off with an agreement to pay them $10,000 a year for ten years if People's Transportation would restrict its operations to the Willamette River.

== See also ==
- Steamboats of the Columbia River
- List of steamboats on Columbia River
- John Gates (Portland mayor) – OSN's chief engineer starting in the 1860s
