= List of Oregon railroads =

The following railroads operate in the U.S. state of Oregon.

== Current railroads ==
=== Common freight carriers ===
- Albany & Eastern Railroad Company (AERC)
  - Operates the Venell Farms Railroad Company
- BNSF Railway Company (BNSF)
- Central Oregon & Pacific Railroad, Inc. (CORP) (GWI)
- City of Prineville Railway (COP)
- Clackamas Valley Railway, LLC (CVLY)
- Coos Bay Rail Line, Inc. (CBR)
- Goose Lake Railway LLC (GOOS)
- Hood River Railroad LLC (DBA Mount Hood Railroad) (MH)
- Idaho Northern & Pacific Railroad Company (INPR)
- Klamath Northern Railway Company (KNOR)
- Oregon Pacific Railroad Company Incorporated (OPR)
- Palouse River and Coulee City Railroad, L.L.C. (PCC)
- Peninsula Terminal Company (PT)
- Port of Tillamook Bay Railroad (POTB) (Out of Service)
- Portland & Western Railroad, Inc. (PNWR)
  - Operates the Hampton Railway, LLC (HLSC) and the Willamette & Pacific Railroad, Inc. (WPRR)
- Portland Terminal Railroad Company (PTRC) (Operated by BNSF)
- Rogue Valley Terminal Railroad Corporation (RVT)
- Union Pacific Railroad Company (UP)
- Wallowa Union Railroad Authority (WURR)
- Willamette Valley Railway (WVR)
- Wyoming Colorado Railroad, Inc. (OERR)

=== Passenger carriers ===
- Amtrak (AMTK)
- Astoria Riverfront Trolley
- Eagle Cap Excursion Train (WURR)
- MAX Light Rail (TMTC)
- Oregon Pacific Railroad Company Incorporated (OPR)
- Oregon Coast Scenic Railroad (OCSR)
- Sumpter Valley Railway
- Washington Park and Zoo Railway
- Westside Express Service (TMTC)
- Willamette Shore Trolley

=== Private freight carriers ===
- SP Newsprint (Newberg, Oregon)
- Superior Lumber Company (Glendale, Oregon)

== Defunct railroads ==
Name	Mark	System (Note: This is one or more of the Class I railroads that the railroad became part of, if any.)	From	To	Successor	Notes
Albany and Lebanon Railroad		SP	1880	1881	Oregon and California Railroad	
Astoria and Columbia River Railroad		GN/ NP	1895	1911	Spokane, Portland and Seattle Railway	
Astoria and South Coast Railway		GN/ NP	1888	1892	Seashore Road Company	
Astoria Southern Railway			1910	1943	N/A	
Beaverton and Willsburg Railroad		SP	1906	1916	Southern Pacific Company	
Boise and Western Railway		UP	1909	1910	Oregon Eastern Railway	
Burlington Northern Inc.	BN		1970	1981	Burlington Northern Railroad	
Burlington Northern Railroad	BN		1981	1996	Burlington Northern and Santa Fe Railway	
Burlington Northern (Oregon–Washington), Inc.			1981	1985	Burlington Northern Railroad	
California Northeastern Railway		SP	1905	1911	Oregon Eastern Railway	
California and Oregon Coast Railroad			1913	1954	N/A	
Carlton and Coast Railroad	CR&C		1910	1940	N/A	
Central Railroad of Oregon			1909	1927	Union Railroad of Oregon	
Central Railway of Oregon			1905	1909	Central Railroad of Oregon	
Central Oregon Railroad		GN/ NP	1908	1909	Oregon Trunk Railway	
Central Pacific Railway		SP	1912	1959	Southern Pacific Company	
Clackamas Southern Railway			1908	1914	Willamette Valley Southern Railway	
Columbia and Nehalem River Railroad			1913	1925	N/A	
Columbia River and Astoria Railway		GN/ NP	1891	1895	Astoria and Columbia River Railroad	
Columbia River and Oregon Central Railroad		UP	1903	1910	Oregon Railroad and Navigation Company	
Columbia Southern Railway		UP	1897	1910	Oregon Railroad and Navigation Company	
Condon, Kinzua and Southern Railroad	CKSO		1928	1976	N/A	
Coos Bay, Roseburg and Eastern Railroad and Navigation Company		SP	1890	1915	Southern Pacific Company	
Corvallis and Alsea River Railway		SP	1907	1911	Portland, Eugene and Eastern Railway	
Corvallis and Eastern Railroad		SP	1897	1915	Southern Pacific Company	
Corvallis and Yaquina Bay Railroad			1872	1874	Willamette Valley and Coast Railroad	
The Dalles and Southern Railroad			1933	1936	N/A	
Dayton, Sheridan and Grande Ronde Railroad		SP	1877	1879	Willamette Valley Railroad	
Des Chutes Railroad		UP	1906	1987	Union Pacific Railroad	
East Portland Traction Company	EPTC		1987	1997	Oregon Pacific Railroad	
Gales Creek and Wilson River Railroad		GN/ NP	1917	1944	Spokane, Portland and Seattle Railway	
Goble, Nehalem and Pacific Railway			1902	1922	N/A	
Great Northern Railway	GN	GN	1927	1970	Burlington Northern Inc.	
Great Southern Railroad			1904	1933	The Dalles and Southern Railroad	
Great Western Railway of Colorado	GWR		1986	1987	Great Western Railway of Oregon	
Great Western Railway of Oregon	GWR		1987	1997	Lake County Railroad	
Independence and Monmouth Railway		SP	1889	1918	N/A	
Klamath Lake Railroad			1901	1913	N/A	
Lake County Railroad	LCR		1997	2005	Modoc Northern Railroad	
Longview, Portland and Northern Railway	LPN		1952	1999	N/A	
LRY LLC (DBA Lake Railway)	LRY		2009	2017	Goose Lake Railway LLC	
Malheur Railroad			1923	1928	Oregon and Northwestern Railroad	
Malheur Valley Railway		UP	1906	1910	Oregon–Washington Railroad and Navigation Company	
Marion and Linn County Railroad		SP	1918	1927	Southern Pacific Company	
Medford and Crater Lake Railroad		GN/ NP	1904	1907	Pacific and Eastern Railway	
Modoc Northern Railroad	MNRR		2005	2009	LRY LLC (DBA Lake Railway)	
Molalla Western Railway	MWRL		1993	1997	Oregon Pacific Railroad	
Mount Hood Railroad		UP	1905	1968	Mount Hood Railway	
Mount Hood Railway	MH	UP	1968	1987	Mount Hood Railroad	
Nevada–California–Oregon Railway		SP	1888	1945	Central Pacific Railway	
Northern Pacific Railroad		NP	1864	1896	Northern Pacific Railway	
Northern Pacific Railway	NP	NP	1896	1970	Burlington Northern Inc.	
Northern Pacific Terminal Company of Oregon		NP/ SP/ UP	1882	1965	Portland Terminal Railroad	
Northwest Railway		UP			Northwestern Railroad	
Northwestern Railroad		UP	1906	1910	Oregon–Washington Railroad and Navigation Company	
Oregon Railway		SP	1880	1880	Oregonian Railway	
Oregon Railroad and Navigation Company		UP	1896	1910	Oregon–Washington Railroad and Navigation Company	
Oregon Railway Extensions Company		UP	1888	1896	Oregon Railroad and Navigation Company	
Oregon Railway and Navigation Company		UP	1879	1896	Oregon Railroad and Navigation Company	
Oregon and California Railroad		SP	1870	1927	Southern Pacific Company	
Oregon, California and Eastern Railway	OCE	GN/ SP	1915	1990	N/A	
Oregon Central Railroad ("West Side Company")		SP	1866	1880	Oregon and California Railroad	
Oregon Central Rail Road ("East Side Company")		SP	1867	1870	Oregon and California Railroad	
Oregon Central and Eastern Railroad		SP	1895	1898	Corvallis and Eastern Railroad	
Oregon Eastern Railway		SP, UP	1905	1912	Central Pacific Railway, Oregon–Washington Railroad and Navigation Company	
Oregon Electric Railway	OE	GN/ NP	1906	1981	Burlington Northern (Oregon–Washington), Inc.	Electric until 1945
Oregon and Northwestern Railroad	ONW		1934	1984	N/A	
Oregon Pacific Railroad		SP	1880	1894	Oregon Central and Eastern Railroad	
Oregon, Pacific and Eastern Railway	OPE		1912	1994	N/A	
Oregon Short Line Railroad		UP	1897	1987	Union Pacific Railroad	
Oregon Short Line Railway		UP	1882	1889	Oregon Short Line and Utah Northern Railway	
Oregon Short Line and Utah Northern Railway		UP	1889	1897	Oregon Short Line Railroad	
Oregon and Southeastern Railroad			1905	1914	Oregon, Pacific and Eastern Railway	
Oregon Southern Railway		UP			Columbia River and Oregon Central Railroad	
Oregon Portage Railroad			1858	1896	N/A	
Oregon Steam Navigation Company		UP	1862	1880	Oregon Railway and Navigation Company	
Oregon Trunk Railway	OT	GN/ NP	1909	1981	Burlington Northern (Oregon–Washington), Inc.	
Oregon Trunk Line, Inc.		GN/ NP	1906	1909	Oregon Trunk Railway	
Oregon and Washington Railroad		UP	1906	1910	Oregon–Washington Railroad and Navigation Company	
Oregon–Washington Railroad and Navigation Company		UP	1910	1987	Union Pacific Railroad	
Oregon and Washington Territory Railroad		NP	1886	1892	Washington and Columbia River Railway	
Oregon Western Railroad		SP	1889	1890	Oregonian Railroad	
Oregon Western Railway		SP	1905	1914	Willamette Pacific Railroad Company	
Oregonian Railroad		SP	1890	1893	Oregon and California Railroad	
Oregonian Railway		SP	1880	1889	Oregon Western Railroad	
Pacific Railway and Navigation Company		SP	1905	1915	Southern Pacific Company	
Pacific Coast Line Railway		SP	1911	1912	Willamette Pacific Railroad Company	
Pacific and Eastern Railway		GN/ NP	1907	1919	N/A	
Pacific Great Western Railway		SP	1911	1912	Willamette Pacific Railroad Company	
Portland, Astoria and Pacific Railroad		GN/ NP	1919	1921	United Railways	
Portland, Eugene and Eastern Railway		SP	1907	1915	Southern Pacific Company	
Portland and Southwestern Railroad			1905	1944	N/A	
Portland Terminal Railroad	PTRC	NP/ SP/ UP	1965			Still exists as a joint subsidiary of the BNSF Railway and Union Pacific Railroad
Portland Traction Company	PRTD	SP/ UP	1930	1991	East Portland Traction Company	Electric until 1958
Portland and Willamette Valley Railway		SP	1885	1892	Portland and Yamhill Railroad	
Portland and Yamhill Railroad		SP	1892	1893	Oregon and California Railroad	
Rogue River Valley Railway			1891	1915	Southern Oregon Traction Company	
Salem, Falls City and Western Railway		SP	1901	1915	Southern Pacific Company	
Seashore Road Company		GN/ NP	1893	1897	Astoria and Columbia River Railroad	
Sheridan and Willamina Railroad		SP	1907	1913	Portland, Eugene and Eastern Railway	
Southern Extensions Railway		UP	1906		Des Chutes Railroad	
Southern Pacific Company	SP	SP	1887	1969	Southern Pacific Transportation Company	
Southern Pacific Transportation Company	SP	SP	1969	1998	Union Pacific Railroad	
Spokane, Portland and Seattle Railway	SP&S, SPS	GN/ NP	1908	1979	Burlington Northern Inc.	
Sumpter Valley Railway			1890	1961	N/A	
Terminal Railway		SP	1911	1913	Willamette Pacific Railroad	
Umatilla Central Railroad		UP	1906	1910	Oregon–Washington Railroad and Navigation Company	
Union Railroad of Oregon	UO		1927	1993	N/A	
Union Railway			1890	1894	Union Street and Suburban Railway	
Union, Cove and Valley Railway			1905	1906	Central Railway of Oregon	
Union Street and Suburban Railway			1894	1906	Union, Cove and Valley Railway	
United Railways	URC	GN/ NP	1906	1944	Spokane, Portland and Seattle Railway	
Valley and Siletz Railroad	VS		1912	1985	Willamette Valley Railroad	
Walla Walla and Columbia River Railroad		UP	1868	1910	Oregon Railroad and Navigation Company	
Walla Walla Valley Railway	WWV	NP	1910	1985	N/A	Electric until 1949
Washington and Columbia River Railway		NP	1892	1907	Northern Pacific Railway	
Western Oregon Railroad		SP	1879	1880	Oregon and California Railroad	
WCTU Railway LLC			1975	2013	Rogue Valley Terminal Railroad Corporation	
White City Terminal & Utilities Co.			1954	1974	WCTU Railway LLC	
Willamette Pacific Railroad Company		SP	1911	1915	Southern Pacific Company	
Willamette Valley Railroad	WVRD		1984	1994	Willamina and Grand Ronde Railway	
Willamette Valley Railroad		SP	1878	1880	Oregon Railway	
Willamette Valley and Coast Railroad			1911		N/A	
Willamette Valley and Coast Railroad		SP	1874	1894	Oregon Central and Eastern Railroad	
Willamina and Grand Ronde Railroad	WGRR		1980	1986	Willamette Valley Railroad	
Willamina and Grand Ronde Railway	WGR		1988	1996	Willamette Valley Railway	
Willamina and Grand Ronde Railway			1920	1955	Longview, Portland and Northern Railway	

=== Private freight carriers ===
- Bridal Veil Falls Lumbering Company
- Bridal Veil Lumbering Company
- Northwest Log and Lumber Company
- Black Diamond Coal Mining Company (Southport Coal Mine Railroad, 1875–1885)
- Sunset Logging Company

=== Passenger carriers ===
- Samtrak

=== Electric ===
- Albany Street Railway
- Astoria Electric Company
- Astoria Street Railway
- Central Railway of Oregon
- City and Suburban Railway
- East Side Railway
- Eugene and Eastern Railway
- Forest Grove Transportation Company
- Medford Coast Railroad
- Mount Hood Railway and Power Company
- Mount Scott Railway
- Multnomah Street Railway
- Oregon City and Southern Railway
- Oregon Electric Railway (OE)
- Oregon Traction Company
- Oregon Water Power and Railway Company
- Pacific Power & Light Company
- Portland Railroad and Terminal Division (PRTD)
- Portland Railway
- Portland Railway, Light and Power Company (PRL&P)
- Portland City and Oregon Railway
- Portland Consolidated Railway
- Portland Consolidated Street Railway
- Portland Electric Power Company (PEP)
- Portland, Eugene and Eastern Railway
- Portland and Fairview Railway
- Portland Traction Company (PRTD)
- Portland and Vancouver Railway
- Southern Oregon Traction Company
- Southern Pacific Company
- Trans-continental Street Railway
- Union Street and Suburban Railway
- United Railways (URC)
- Valley Railway
- Walla Walla Valley Railway (WWV)
- Walla Walla Valley Traction Company
- Waverly–Woodstock Electric Railway
- Willamette Bridge Railway
- Willamette Falls Company
- Willamette Valley Railway
- Willamette Valley Southern Railway

== See also ==
- Lists of Oregon-related topics
- Rail transportation in Oregon
