= Oregon Eastern Railway =

1906-1912 railroad in California and Oregon

- Oregon Eastern Railway (red) and lines built by successors SP and UP (dotted)

Overview
- Locale: Oregon and California
- Dates of operation: 1906–1912

Technical
- Track gauge: 4 ft 8 1/2 in (1,435 mm) standard gauge

The Oregon Eastern Railway was a predecessor of the Southern Pacific Transportation Company that acquired or built most of the Natron Cutoff (a.k.a. Cascade Line) in northern California and southern Oregon, United States. It also made surveys and acquired right-of-way in eastern Oregon, which were subsequently sold to Union Pacific Railroad subsidiary Oregon–Washington Railroad and Navigation Company.

The Natron Cutoff is on the National Register of Historic Places, considered significant to the period 1905 to 1945. The eastern line is now the similarly named Oregon Eastern Railroad

== History ==
Starting in 1903, the Weed Lumber Company built a private railroad from the main line of the Southern Pacific Company (SP), formerly the Oregon and California Railroad, in Weed to Grass Lake, California. On July 6, 1905, the California Northeastern Railway was incorporated to operate the line as a common carrier. The new company bought the line on July 29, and an SP-funded reconstruction was completed on September 1, 1906, when the line was opened to the public as a leased branch line of the SP. Extensions were completed to Bray on September 6, 1907, Dorris on May 1, 1908, the Oregon state line on August 25, 1908, Worden on November 25, 1908, Ady on January 1, 1909, and finally the whole 86.15 miles (138.64 km) to Klamath Falls, Oregon on May 20, 1909.

On August 21, 1905, the Oregon Eastern Railway was incorporated in the interest of the SP and Union Pacific Railroad (UP), then both controlled by E. H. Harriman. This company surveyed a route from a line of SP lessor Oregon and California Railroad at Natron, near Springfield, over the Cascades in the direction of the UP near Ontario, Oregon. It also planned to build branches south to Klamath Falls and Lakeview, the former connecting with the California Northeastern. This company began construction in November 1909 on the line north from Klamath Falls, soon reaching Chiloquin under lease to the SP. The Oregon Eastern acquired the property of the California Northeastern on December 18, 1911, and on February 12, 1912, the property of the Oregon Eastern was sold to SP lessor Central Pacific Railway, which owned the main line through Weed. The Central Pacific completed two segments on which the Oregon Eastern had begun work: Natron to Oakridge and Chiloquin to Kirk, in May and September 1912 respectively. However, work was then placed on hold while the federal government decided whether the SP's lease of the CP violated the Sherman Antitrust Act. (It had already broken up the SP-UP combination in 1913.)

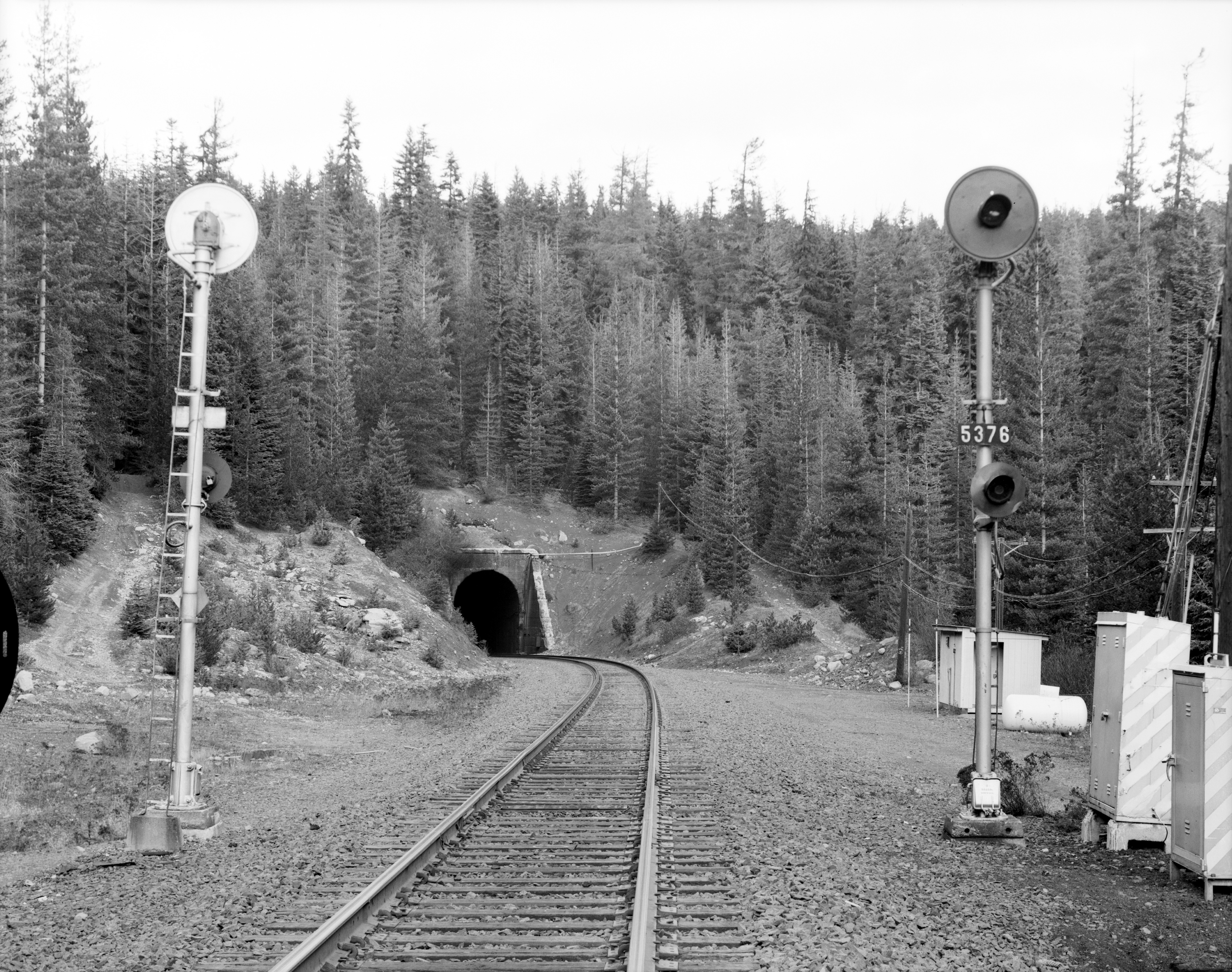
West portal of Tunnel No. 3 (Summit Tunnel), beneath Pengra Pass. Built by SP in 1925.

The Transportation Act of 1920 gave the Interstate Commerce Commission the power to approve combinations that would serve the public interest, and on February 10, 1923, the ICC approved the SP's continued control of the Central Pacific, which was backed by the Justice Department on June 11. Construction resumed in October, and on September 1, 1926 the Natron Cutoff was completed. Finally, On April 17, 1927, a new line opened between Black Butte (south of Weed) and Grass Lake, replacing the cheaply built former logging line, and allowing the SP to inaugurate the all-Pullman Cascade between San Francisco and Portland over this route.

As for the line into eastern Oregon, the Oregon Eastern sold its surveys and right-of-way to new UP subsidiary Oregon–Washington Railroad and Navigation Company (OWR&N) on December 23, 1910. Some of this property was acquired from the Boise and Western Railway, which had been incorporated on September 13, 1909 in the interest of Spokane, Portland and Seattle Railway subsidiary Oregon Trunk Railway to build in the same area. The OWR&N subsequently built the Ontario–Burns Branch on this alignment, branching from the former Malheur Valley Railway at Vale and eventually reaching Burns, which it leased to UP subsidiary Oregon Short Line Railroad for operation.

All of the Cascade Line remains in service as part of the Union Pacific Railroad's I-5 corridor also served by Amtrak's Coast Starlight. The Ontario–Burns Branch in eastern Oregon was sold on November 6, 1989 to shortline Wyoming Colorado Railroad, but the 120 mile majority of the line was abandoned eastward from Burns to Celatom in June 1992. The remainder is still operated by the Wyoming Colorado Railroad as the Oregon Eastern Railroad.

== See also ==
- Cascade Subdivision
- List of defunct California railroads
- List of defunct Oregon railroads
