= Holcomb Creek Trestle =

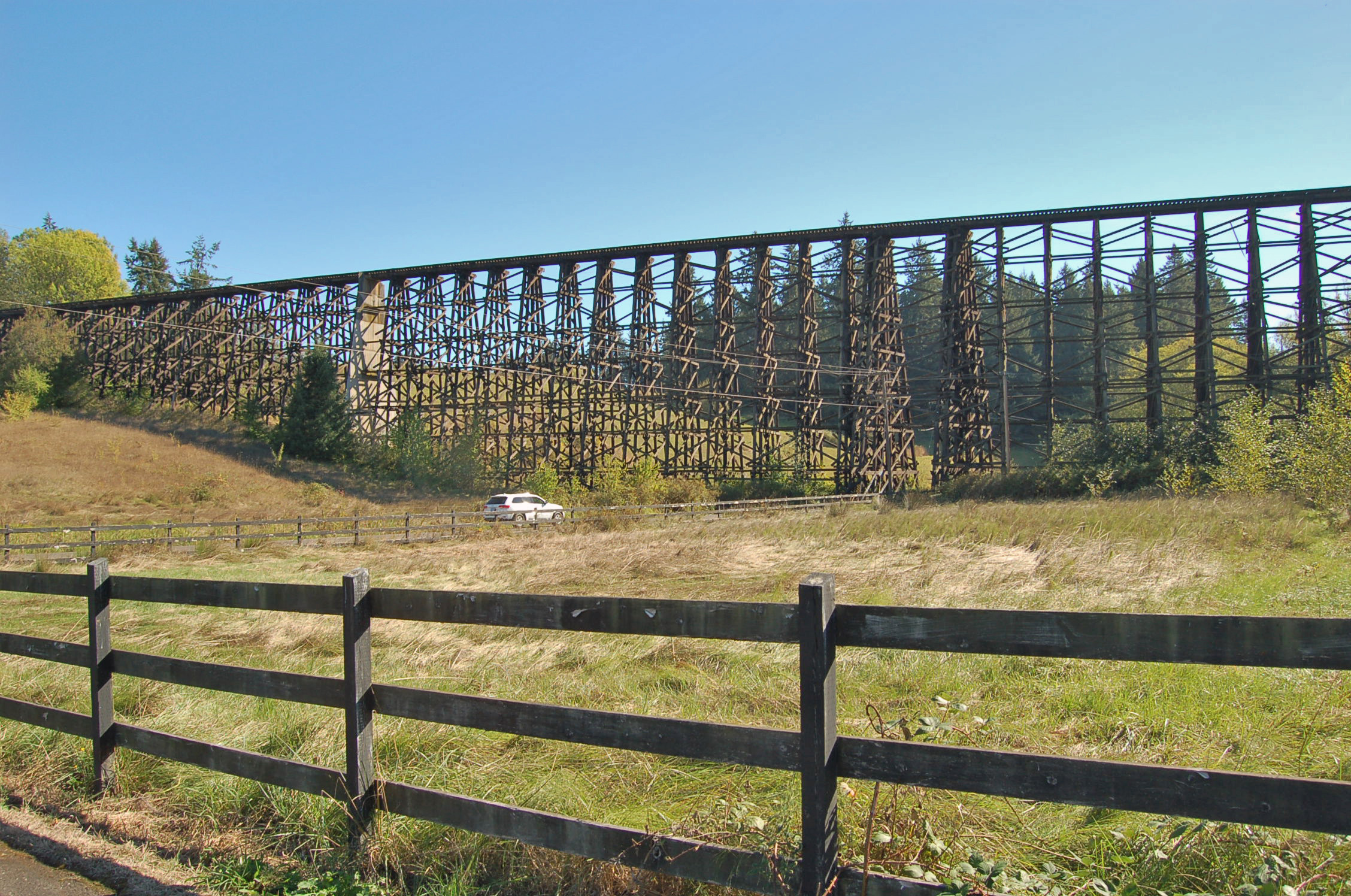
- Coordinates: 45.5969°N 122.8983°W
- Carries: Portland and Western Railroad
- Crosses: Holcomb Creek
- Locale: Helvetia, Oregon

Characteristics
- Design: Trestle
- Total length: 1,168 feet (356 m)
- Height: 90 feet (27 m)

History
- Opened: c. 1911

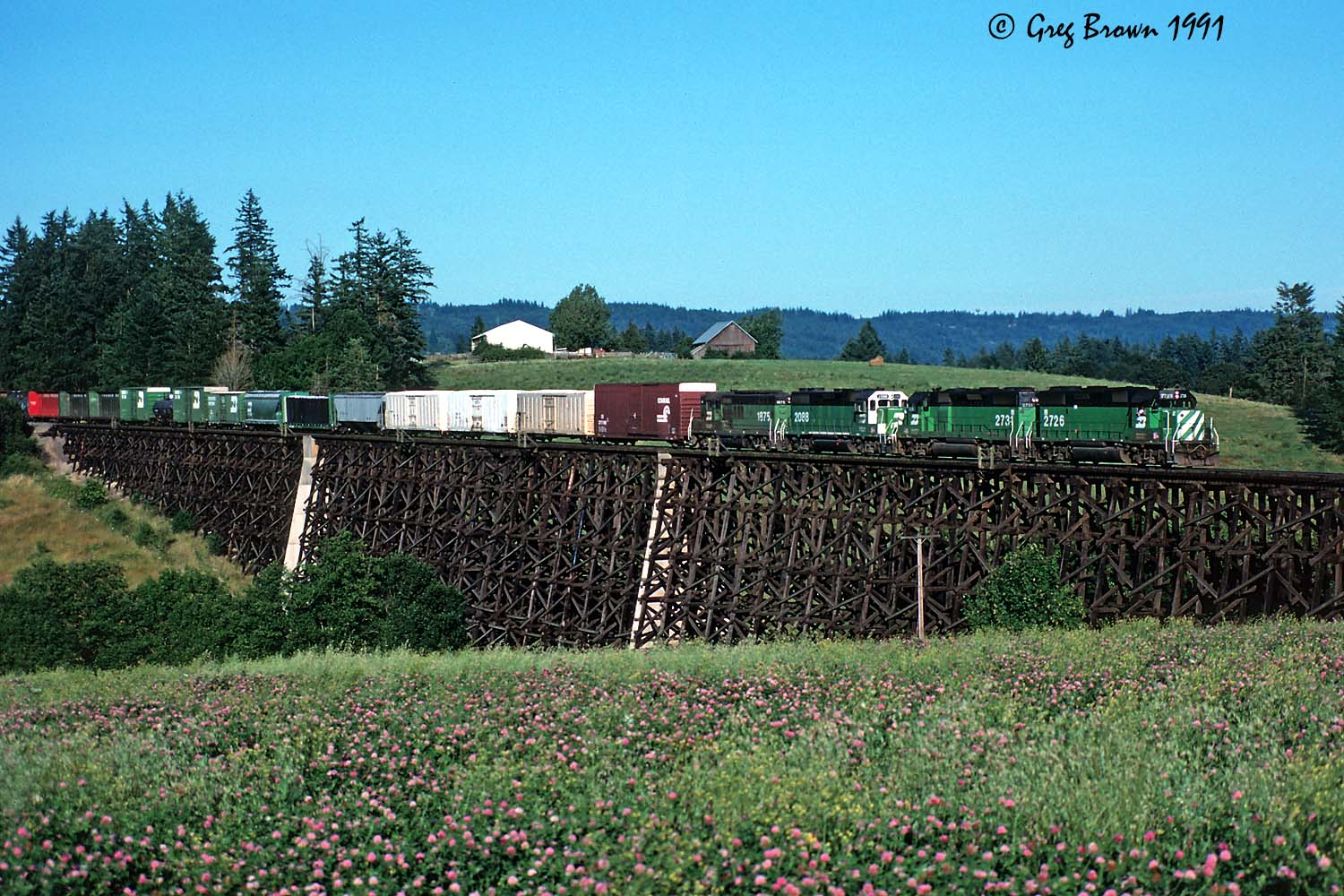
A train passing over the trestle in 1991

The Holcomb Creek Trestle, also known as the Dick Road Trestle, is a wooden railroad trestle bridge in Washington County, Oregon, United States, on Dick Road near the unincorporated community of Helvetia. Spanning 1,168 feet (356 m), it is thought to be the longest wooden railroad trestle still in use in the United States, as well as the largest trestle in Oregon.

The trestle was completed in around 1911 for the United Railways, a now-defunct railway which ran from Portland to Wilkesboro. It was rebuilt in 1947. A connection to the Oregon Electric Railway was later added. It was used by Burlington Northern Railroad (which merged into BNSF Railway in 1995) until the mid-1990s, and was known by that company as "Bridge 16.7". The Holcomb Creek Trestle is currently operated by Portland and Western Railroad.

The trestle is the subject of several local urban legends and is rumored to be haunted. According to one account, it is haunted by the ghost of a man who killed himself and his family in a murder-suicide in the 1960s. It is also said to be the site of several suicides by hanging which took place in the early 20th century.

== See also ==
- Reportedly haunted locations in Oregon
