= Wilkesboro =

Wilkesboro may refer to several places in the United States:

- North Wilkesboro, North Carolina
- Wilkesboro, North Carolina
- Wilkesboro, Oregon
