= Wygant State Natural Area =

State park in the U.S. state of Oregon

- Location within Oregon Location within the United States
- Type: Natural Area
- Location: Hood River County, Oregon
- Nearest city: Hood River Columbia River Gorge, Oregon, U.S.
- Coordinates: 45°41′29″N 121°38′26″W
- Operator: Oregon Parks and Recreation Department
- Status: year round hiking

Wygant State Natural Area is a state park in northern Hood River County, Oregon, just west of the city of Hood River, and is administered by the Oregon Parks and Recreation Department. It is located in the Columbia River Gorge, adjacent to an abandoned section of the Historic Columbia River Highway. This park is one of a trio encompassing areas in the vicinity of Mitchell Point, along with Seneca Fouts Memorial State Natural Area and Vinzenz Lausmann Memorial State Natural Area. The three parks offers scenic hiking and views over the Gorge.

There are no facilities. It is primarily a hiking trail through dense forested, mountainous wilderness. The first mile or so is on a paved road, abandoned since about 1960, when I-84 opened. The park website indicates that the trail has prairie and desert portions.

Wygant State Natural Area lies within the Columbia River Gorge National Scenic Area.

== See also ==
- List of Oregon State Parks
