= Vinzenz Lausmann Memorial State Natural Area =

Park in Oregon, United States

- Location within Oregon Location within the United States
- Type: Public, state
- Location: Hood River County, Oregon
- Nearest city: Hood River
- Coordinates: 45°41′34″N 121°37′45″W
- Area: 126 acres (51 ha)
- Operator: Oregon Parks and Recreation Department

Vinzenz Lausmann Memorial State Natural Area is a state park in northern Hood River County, Oregon, 5.3 miles (8.5 km) west of the city of Hood River, and is administered by the Oregon Parks and Recreation Department. It is located in the Columbia River Gorge, adjacent to an abandoned section of the Historic Columbia River Highway. This park is one of a trio encompassing areas in the vicinity of Mitchell Point, along with Seneca Fouts Memorial State Natural Area and Wygant State Natural Area. The three parks offer scenic hiking and views over the Gorge.

The 126 acres (51 ha) of the park were donated to the state of Oregon by the family of Vinzenz Lausmann, and named in his memory.

Vinzenz Lausmann Memorial State Natural Area lies within the Columbia River Gorge National Scenic Area.

== See also ==
- List of Oregon State Parks
