= CCT Rail System =

US shortline railroad holding company

CCT Rail System Corporation
- Company type: Private
- Industry: Shortline freight railroads
- Founded: November 20, 2012 (RVTR Rail Holdings LLC); March 15, 2013 (CCT Rail System Corporation)
- Founder: Scott DeVries
- Headquarters: White City, Oregon, United States of America
- Area served: Southern Oregon
- Key people: Scott DeVries, President & CEO
- Number of employees: 7 (2025)
- Subsidiaries: Rogue Reload Corporation Rogue Valley Terminal Railroad Corporation; Safe Route Railcar Services Corporation
- Website: www.cctrailsystem.com

CCT Rail System Corporation is a US shortline railroad holding company that owns and operates the Rogue Valley Terminal Railroad Corporation.

The company was founded in Superior, Wisconsin. In June 2014, the company relocated its offices to White City, Oregon in order to be closer to the rail operations of Rogue Valley Terminal Railroad Corporation.

== History ==
The company was founded on November 20, 2012, as RVTR Rail Holdings LLC for the purpose of acquiring the WCTU Railway LLC (WCTR) from Marmon Transportation Services LLC, a unit of Berkshire Hathaway. RVTR Rail Holdings successfully acquired WCTR on December 17, 2012.

To effectively re-organize and re-brand the company as a platform for acquiring and operating other North American shortline railroads in the future, the company was renamed CCT Rail System Corporation on March 15, 2013. The company's then-sole subsidiary, WCTR, was also renamed Rogue Valley Terminal Railroad Corporation (RVT) on the same date, in order to better market the broader Southern Oregon region served by the railroad.

In March 2019, the company launched Safe Route Railcar Services Corporation, a private railcar storage, maintenance and cleaning firm, which later ceased operations in January 2022. In November 2022, the company launched Rogue Reload Corporation, its first truck-to-rail transload service.

== Locomotive Fleet ==
Operating Railroad	Unit Number(s)	Locomotive Model	Total Quantity
RVT	RVT 82	EMD SW1200	1
RVT	RVT 99	EMD SW1500	1
		Fleet Total:	2
