= Worden, Oregon =

Unincorporated community in the state of Oregon, United States

- Unincorporated community
- Location within Oregon Location within the United States
- Coordinates: 42°02′44″N 121°51′59″W
- Country: United States
- State: Oregon
- County: Klamath
- Elevation: 4,101 ft (1,250 m)
- Time zone: UTC-8 (Pacific (PST))
  - Summer (DST): UTC-7 (PDT)
- GNIS feature ID: 1136925

Worden is an unincorporated community in Klamath County, Oregon, United States. It is about 14 miles (23 km) south of Klamath Falls and 3 miles (5 km) north of the Oregon–California border on U.S. Route 97.

== History ==
The townsite of Worden was purchased and laid out by William S. Worden, a member of a family of early Klamath County settlers. William Worden was a right-of-way agent for the Southern Pacific Railroad (SP) during the time SP predecessor Oregon Eastern Railway was building a railroad into Klamath Falls. He was later elected Klamath County judge. Worden station near Dallas in Polk County on the SP Falls City Line may have also been named for William Worden. Worden post office was established in 1910.

As of 1990, Worden had a 24-hour café and truck stop.
