= Seneca Fouts Memorial State Natural Area =

State park in Oregon, United States

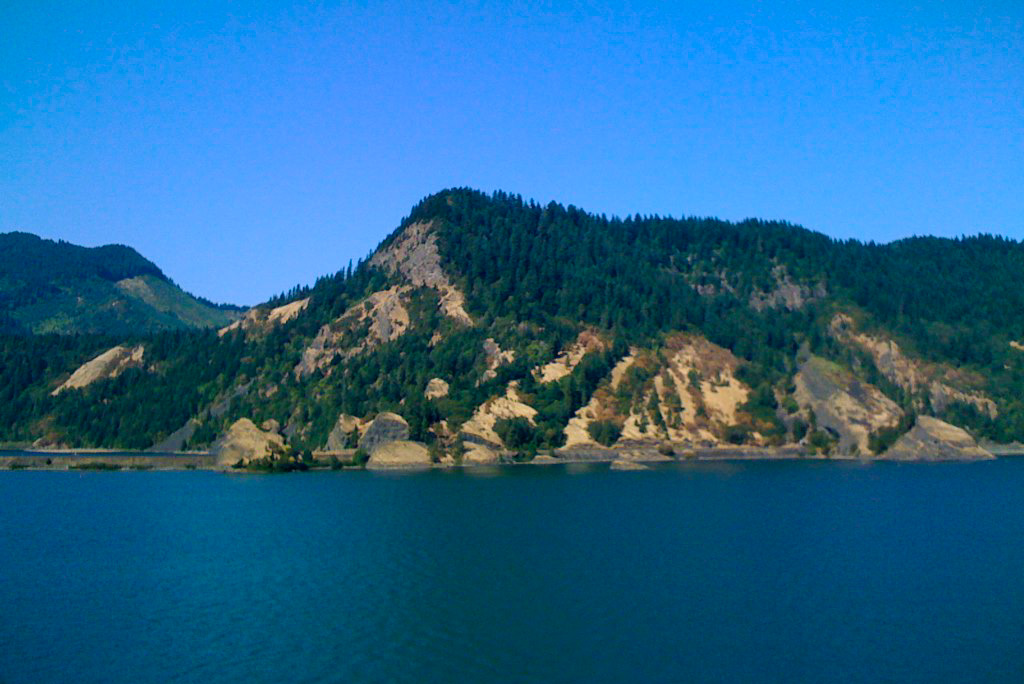
- Seneca Fouts Memorial State Natural Area, September 2011

- Location within Oregon Location within the United States
- Type: Public, State
- Location: Hood River County, Oregon
- Nearest city: Hood River
- Coordinates: 45°42′11″N 121°37′07″W
- Operator: Oregon Parks and Recreation Department

Seneca Fouts Memorial State Natural Area is a state park in northern Hood River County, Oregon, just west of the city of Hood River, and is administered by the Oregon Parks and Recreation Department. It is located in the Columbia River Gorge, adjacent to an abandoned section of the Historic Columbia River Highway. This park is one of a trio encompassing areas in the vicinity of Mitchell Point, along with Vinzenz Lausmann Memorial State Natural Area and Wygant State Natural Area. The three parks offers scenic hiking and views over the Gorge.

Seneca Fouts Memorial State Natural Area lies within the Columbia River Gorge National Scenic Area.

== See also ==
- List of Oregon State Parks
