= Umatilla Central Railroad =

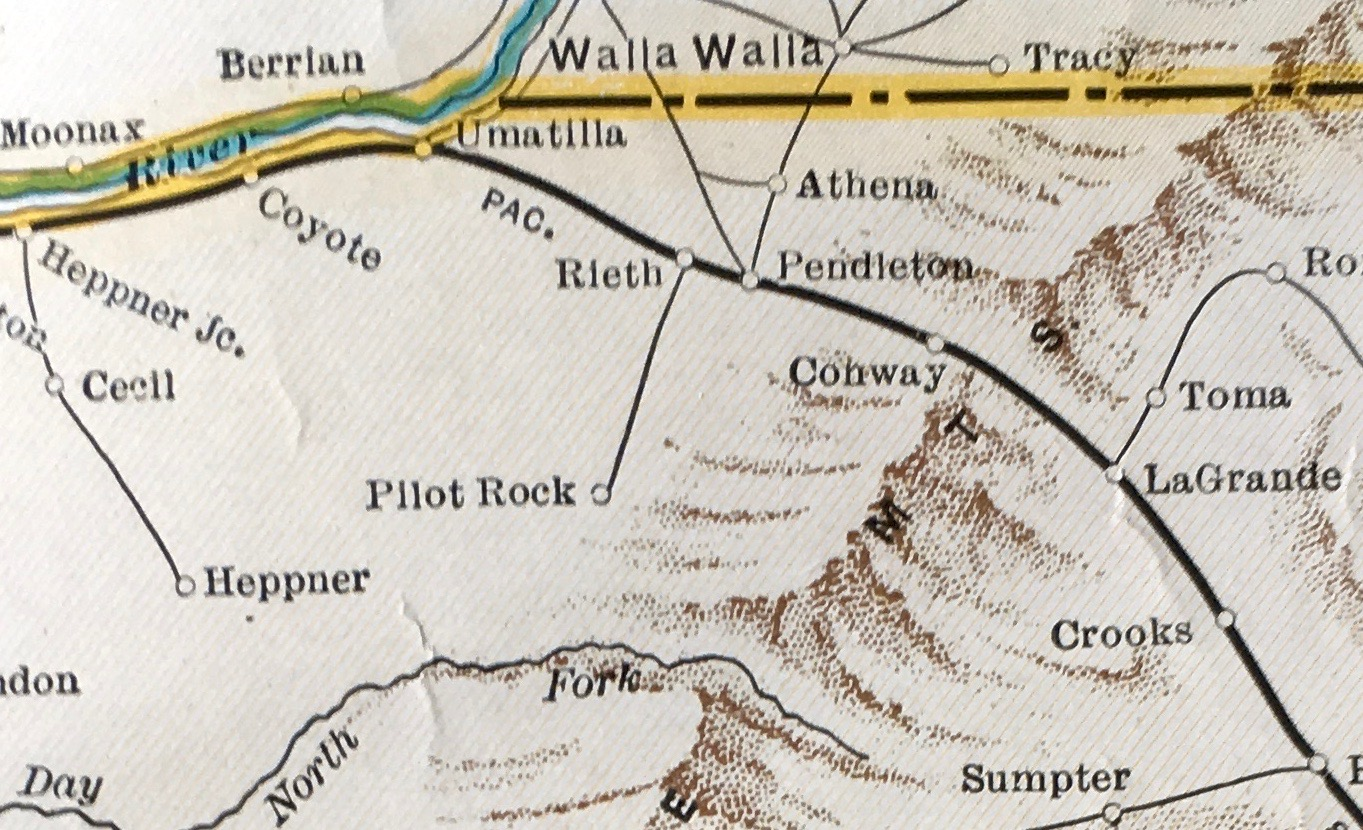
1931 Route

The Umatilla Central Railroad built a 14.21-mile (22.87 km) branch line of railroad in Umatilla County, Oregon, U.S., connecting the main line of the Oregon Railroad and Navigation Company (OR&N) at Rieth to Pilot Rock. The company was incorporated on May 24, 1906, and was operated under lease by the OR&N from opening date, December 16, 1907, until December 23, 1910, when the properties of both were sold to new Union Pacific Railroad (UP) subsidiary Oregon–Washington Railroad and Navigation Company. The line has survived as UP's Pilot Rock Industrial Lead.

== See also ==
- List of defunct Oregon railroads
