= Rieth, Oregon =

Unincorporated community in the state of Oregon, United States

- Unincorporated community
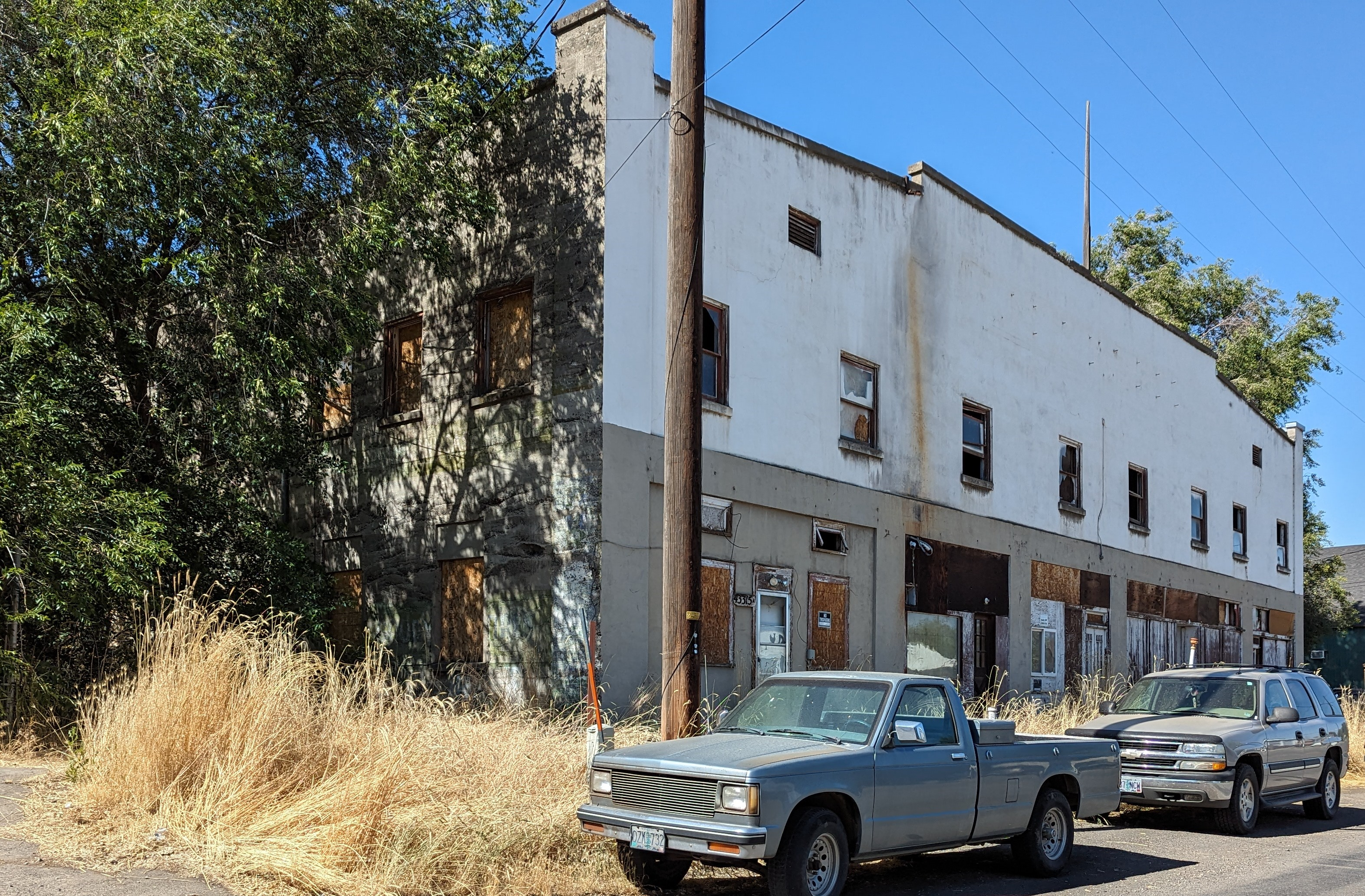
- Building on Main Street

- Location within the state of Oregon
- Coordinates: 45°39′39″N 118°52′17″W
- Country: United States
- State: Oregon
- County: Umatilla
- Elevation: 1,011 ft (308 m)
- Time zone: UTC-8 (Pacific (PST))
  - Summer (DST): UTC-7 (PDT)
- Area codes: 458 and 541
- GNIS feature ID: 1126008

Rieth is an unincorporated community in Umatilla County, Oregon, United States. It is south of Interstate 84/U.S. Route 30/U.S. Route 395 about 5 miles (8 km) west of Pendleton near the Umatilla River.

Rieth was an important division point of the Oregon–Washington Railroad and Navigation Company, which named the station at the new shops and terminals it constructed there after a local pioneer family, the Rieths. The railway's Pilot Rock Line, constructed in 1907, joined the mainline in Rieth. This line was once the Umatilla Central Railroad. In 1917, the Post Office Department established an office named "Reith". The name was soon corrected by the United States Board on Geographic Names. The post office closed in 1971. The main railroad yards, now owned by Union Pacific, were later moved to Hinkle.

In 1922, Rieth had a population of 200, a school, a store, and other businesses. In 1940 Rieth had a population of 45.

== See also ==
- Media related to Rieth, Oregon at Wikimedia Commons
