= Pengra Pass rail route =

Railroad in California and Oregon

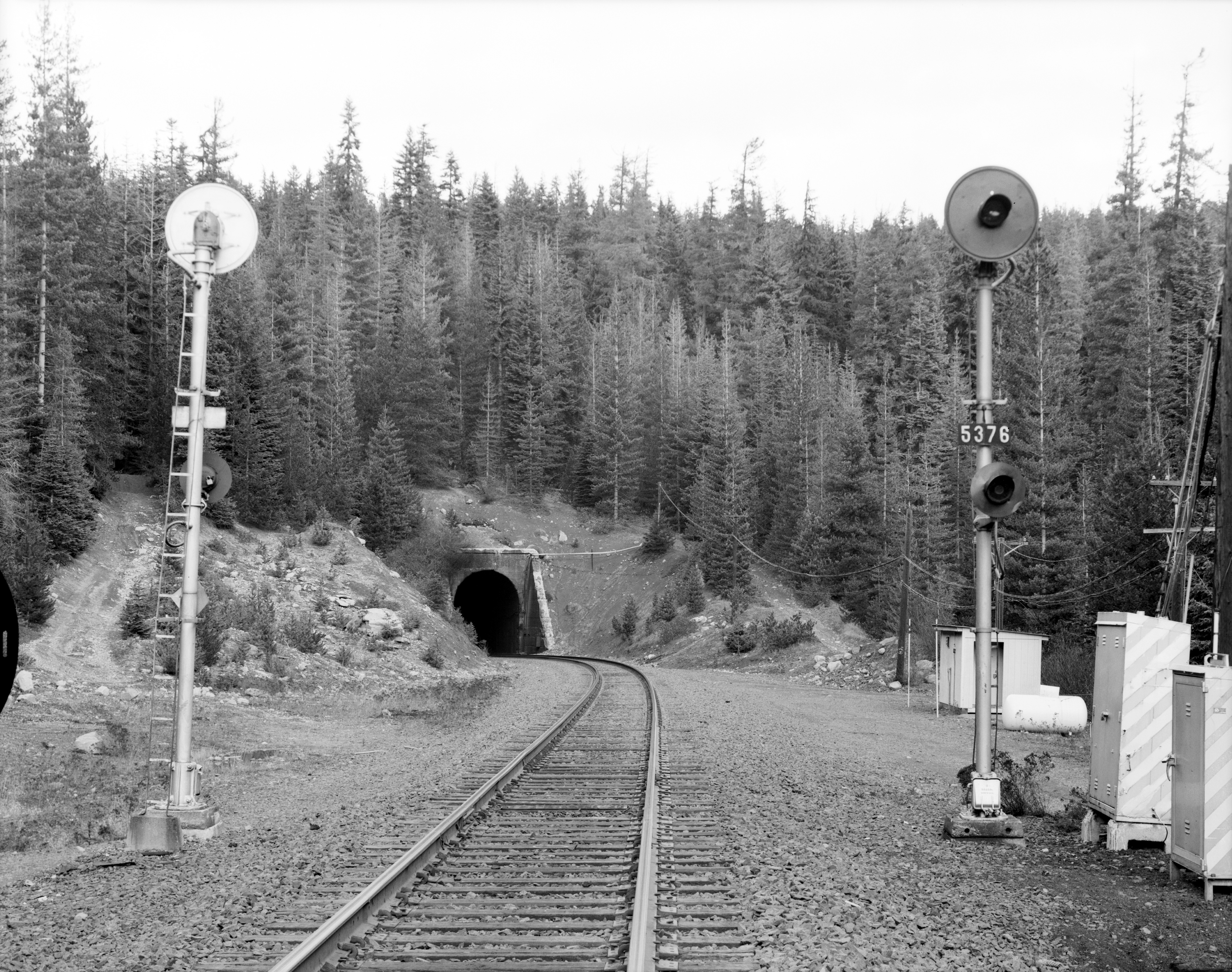
West portal of Tunnel No. 3 (Summit Tunnel), beneath Pengra Pass in Oregon. The tunnel was built by the Southern Pacific Railroad in 1925.

The Pengra Pass rail route, also known as the Natron Cutoff, the Cascade Subdivision, or the Cascade Line, is a Union Pacific Railroad line (originally a Southern Pacific Railroad line) connecting Eugene, Oregon, with Klamath Falls, Oregon. Construction of the line began in 1905 and was completed in the mid-1920s. Its name denotes a mountain pass on the Lane County–Klamath County boundary in the Cascade Mountains of Oregon, about 1.5 miles (2.4 km) from Willamette Pass. The line heads southeast from Eugene, up the Cascades and over Pengra Pass, then southward beside U.S. Route 97 to Klamath Falls, where it splits in two, each track continuing into California. The route has at least 22 tunnels, several snow sheds and multiple bridges across canyons. BNSF has trackage rights between Klamath Falls and Chemult.

The Pengra Pass route was built to provide trains running between Eugene and California with a cheaper and otherwise more practical option than to follow the older Siskiyou Pass route, which runs south from Eugene and over Siskiyou Pass to California. The new route opened in February 1926. As a result, the Siskiyou Pass route was rendered nearly obsolete. In 2008, a landslide in the area shut down rail traffic for 105 days, which forced Union Pacific trains to make lengthy detours and Amtrak to halt services between Eugene and Sacramento, severing a key west coast rail link. In 2011, no trains had used the Siskiyou Pass route in almost a decade. By 2015 however, that line was reopening to relieve I-5 of local truck traffic. On May 29, 2018, one of the tunnels, known as Tunnel 11, caved in during scheduled maintenance work, shutting down rail traffic for 3 weeks. Union Pacific rerouted their freight trains running between Northern California and Portland through a lengthy detour, while Amtrak service did not operate between Eugene and Sacramento (initially between Eugene and Klamath Falls, with a bus bridge between the two points).

Nonetheless, a major helper operation is demanded by the Pengra Pass route's 44 miles (71 km) of constant grade—the longest anywhere on the former Southern Pacific system, including Donner Pass.

The right-of-way is surrounded by waterfalls and streams running through a Douglas fir forest. At many locations, the track runs atop the steep southern slopes of the Salt Creek canyon.

== See also ==
- List of mountain passes in Oregon
- List of Oregon railroads
- List of tunnels documented by the Historic American Engineering Record in Oregon
- Oregon Eastern Railway (SP predecessor)
- Pengra Bridge
