= Mitchell Point Tunnel =

Former tunnel of the Historic Columbia River Highway

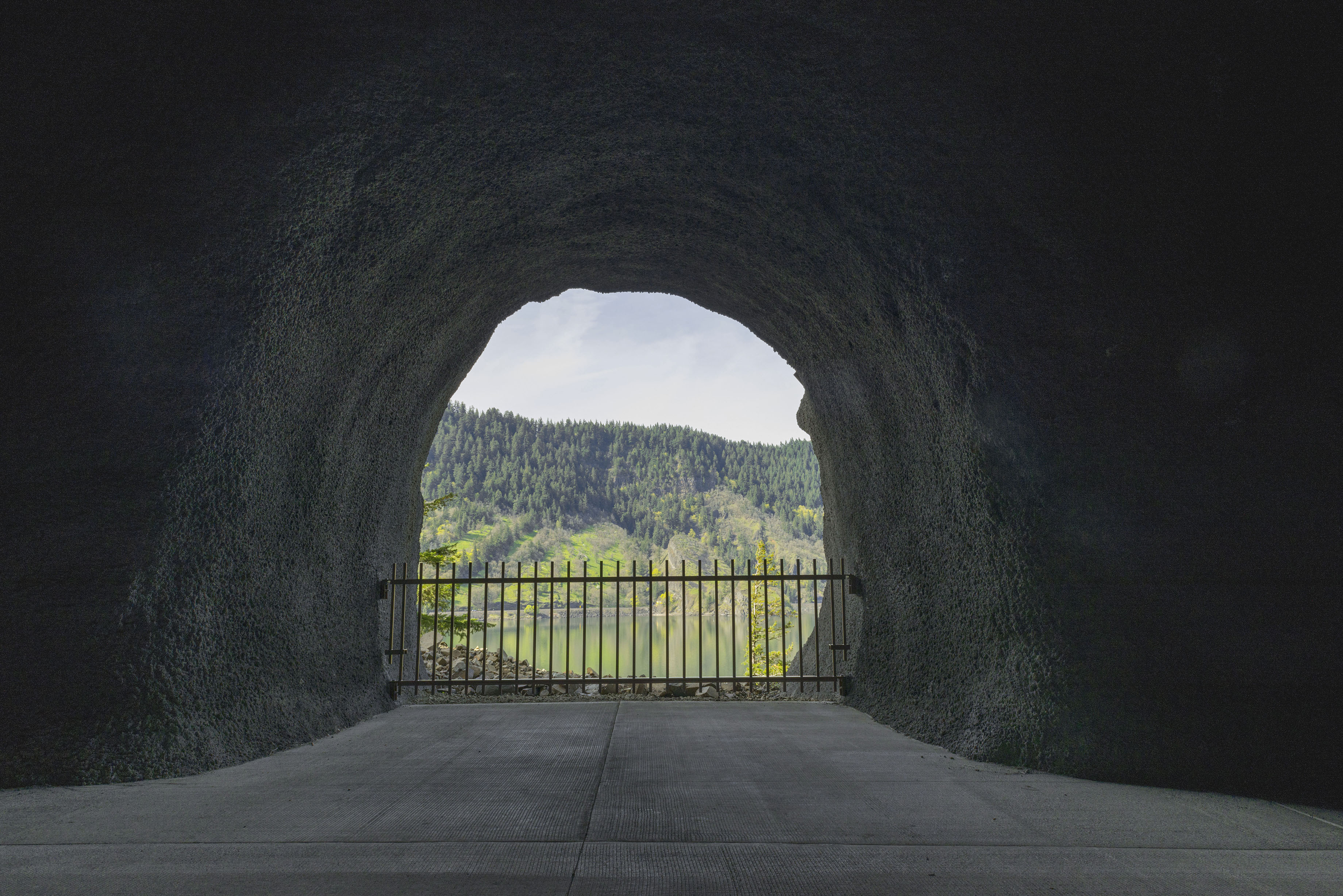
- View of the Columbia River from inside the rebuilt tunnel in 2024
- Interactive map of Mitchell Point Tunnel

Overview
- Location: Columbia River Gorge
- Coordinates: 45.704096°N 121.616839°W
- Status: Active
- Route: Historic Columbia River Highway

Operation
- Opened: 1915
- Closed: 1966
- Rebuilt: 2021-2024
- Reopened: 2025
- Owner: Oregon Department of Transportation
- Traffic: Bike, pedestrian

The Mitchell Point Tunnel is a tunnel at the eastern end of the Historic Columbia River Highway in Oregon, United States, west of Hood River. The original tunnel existed from 1915 to 1966. A pedestrian and bike only tunnel opened on March 21, 2025, after a dedication ceremony on November 16, 2024.

== History ==
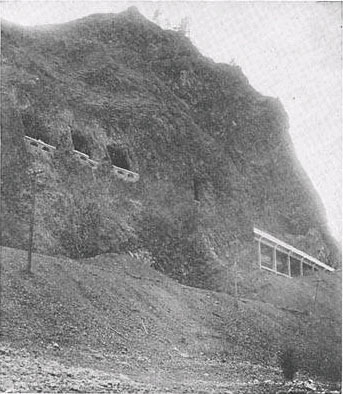
Looking up from the river

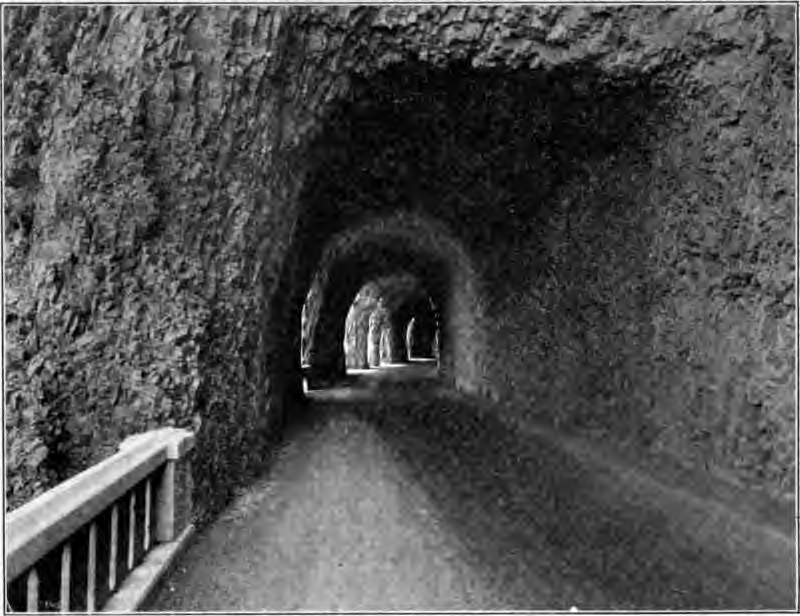
Entrance to the original tunnel

The tunnel was designed by John Arthur Elliott, who was inspired by a tunnel similarly set into a cliff face above Lake Lucerne in Switzerland. It was built in 1915 and opened late in the year, the first major roadway tunnel in the United States. The tunnel measured 390 feet (120 m) long, 18 feet (5.5 m) wide, and 10 feet (3.0 m) tall. At the time it was one of the most expensive, if not the most expensive, sections of road ever built.

In 1932, the Toothrock Tunnel was opened, and some traffic was rerouted to the new alignment, though Mitchell Point Tunnel remained open to vehicle traffic until the early 1950s, when the road was rerouted to the base of Mitchell Point. The tunnel was subsequently blocked off with debris, and remained closed until 1966 when it was destroyed as part of Interstate 80N construction.

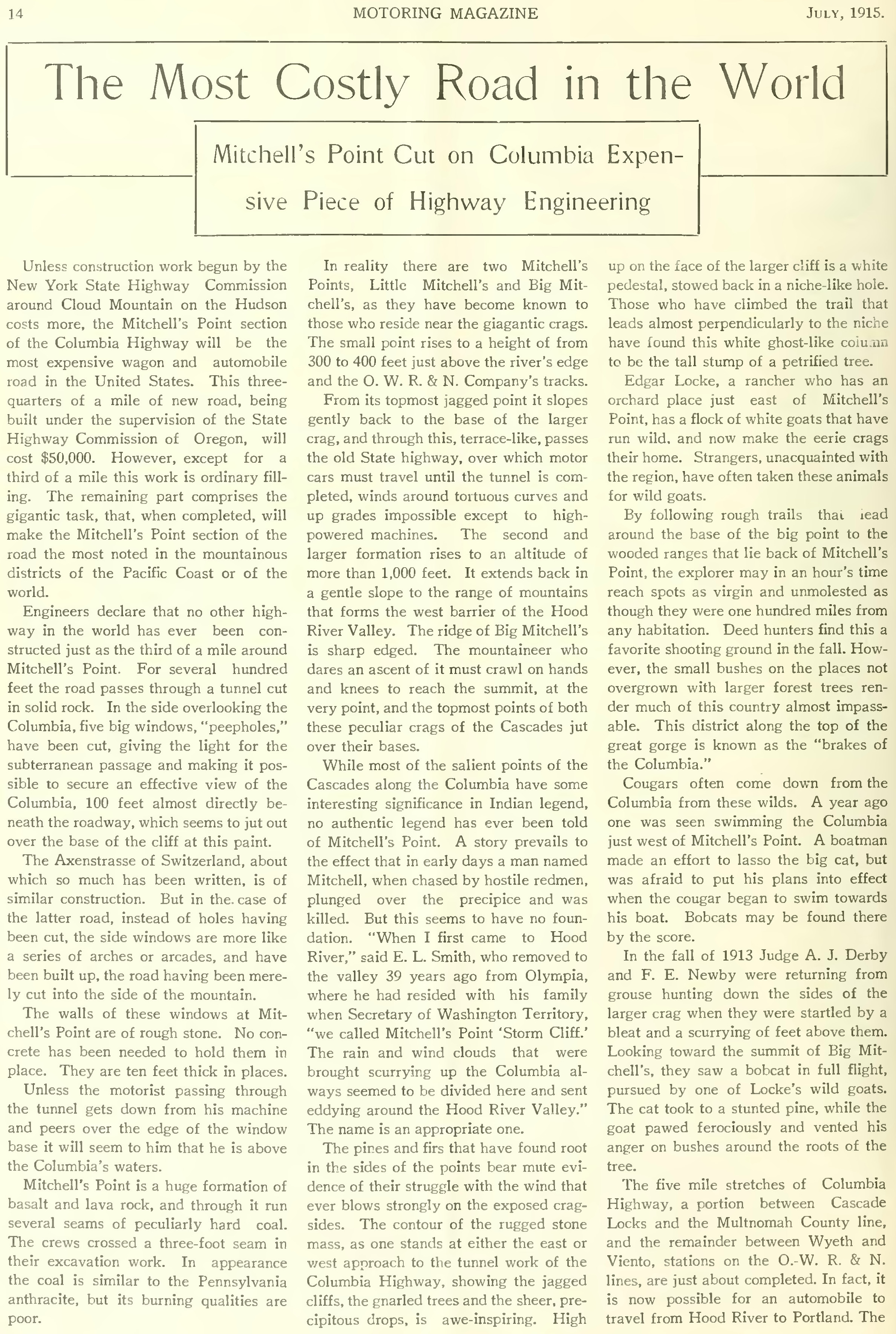
"The Most Costly Road in the World" "Mitchell's Point Cut on Columbia Expensive Piece of Highway Engineering" July, 1915 article (part 1)

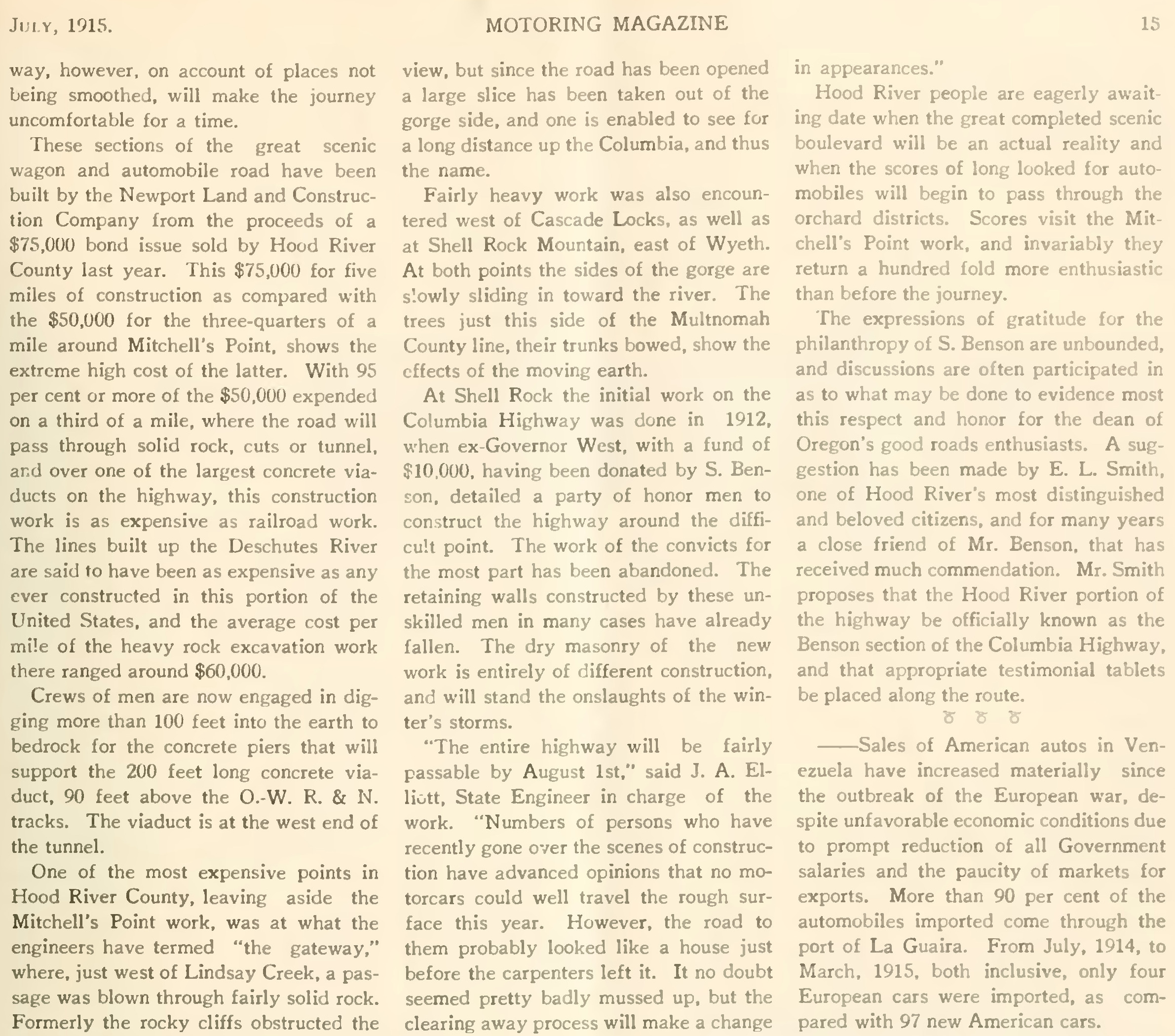
"The Most Costly Road in the World" "Mitchell's Point Cut on Columbia Expensive Piece of Highway Engineering" July, 1915 article (part 2)

As part of the rebuilding of the Columbia River Highway into a network of trails, the Oregon Department of Transportation has considered the possibility of boring a new tunnel on Mitchell Point.

Mitchell's Point is named for Captain Mitchell, an early Oregon settler who was said to have jumped from the point to commit suicide, rather than be captured by natives, during a conflict in 1856 later dubbed the Cascades Massacre. In 1921 there were two proposals to change the name to honor heroes of overseas wars.

In 2021 the Oregon Department of Transportation (ODOT) announced commencement of a project to build a replica tunnel in the original location. On November 16, 2024, ODOT held a preview event, letting people view the Columbia River Gorge from Mitchell Point Tunnel for the first time in 71 years. The tunnel opened on March 21, 2025.

== See also ==
- List of bridges documented by the Historic American Engineering Record in Oregon
- List of tunnels documented by the Historic American Engineering Record in Oregon
