= Portland and Southwestern Railroad Tunnel =

Coordinates: 45.83236°N 123.05044°W

- U.S. National Register of Historic Places
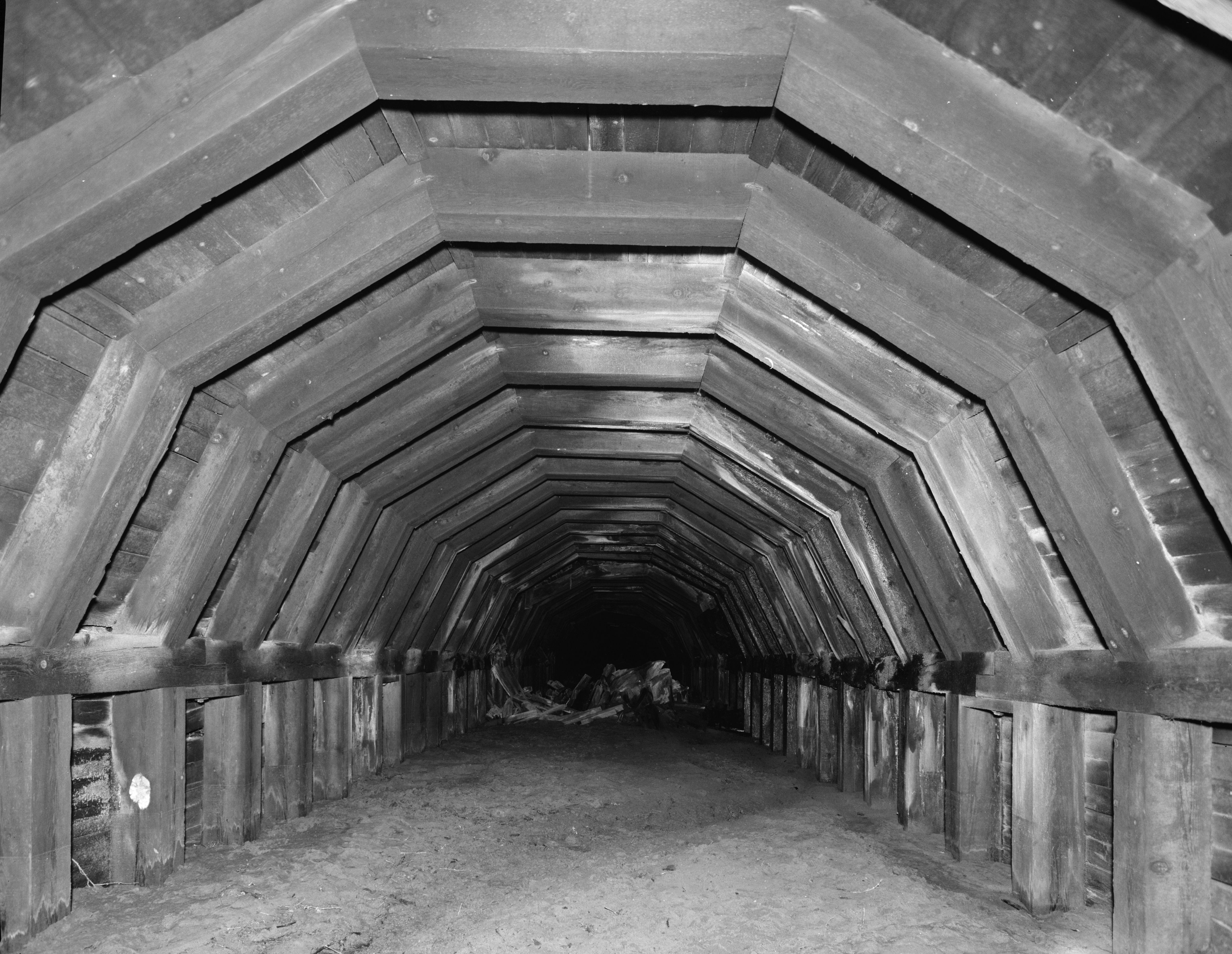

- Location within Oregon Location within the United States
- Location: Columbia County, Oregon, USA
- Nearest city: Scappoose, Oregon
- Built: 1910
- Architect: Chapman Timber Co.; Nehalem Timber & Logging Co.
- NRHP reference No.: 81000481
- Added to NRHP: August 17, 1981

The Portland and Southwestern Railroad Tunnel, also known as the Nehalem Divide Railroad Tunnel, is an abandoned railroad tunnel near Scappoose, Oregon, United States, that is listed on the National Register of Historic Places. The tunnel was driven by the Portland and Southwestern Railroad, whose chief business was logging. Unusually for a logging railroad, the Portland and Southwestern built tunnels. In order to reach the far side of the Nehalem divide in the Northern Oregon Coast Range, the railroad undertook a 1,712-foot (522 m) tunnel. Some work was started in 1910, but most work began in 1918 and was completed in 1919. Since the tunnel was not through solid rock, the tunnel was lined with timber. The tunnel was used until 1945, when it was replaced by a truck road over the divide.

While portions of the tunnel roof have collapsed, the tunnel is still open from end to end.

The west portal is located at ; the east portal is at .

== See also ==
- List of bridges on the National Register of Historic Places in Oregon
- List of tunnels documented by the Historic American Engineering Record in Oregon
