= Columbia River and Oregon Central Railroad =

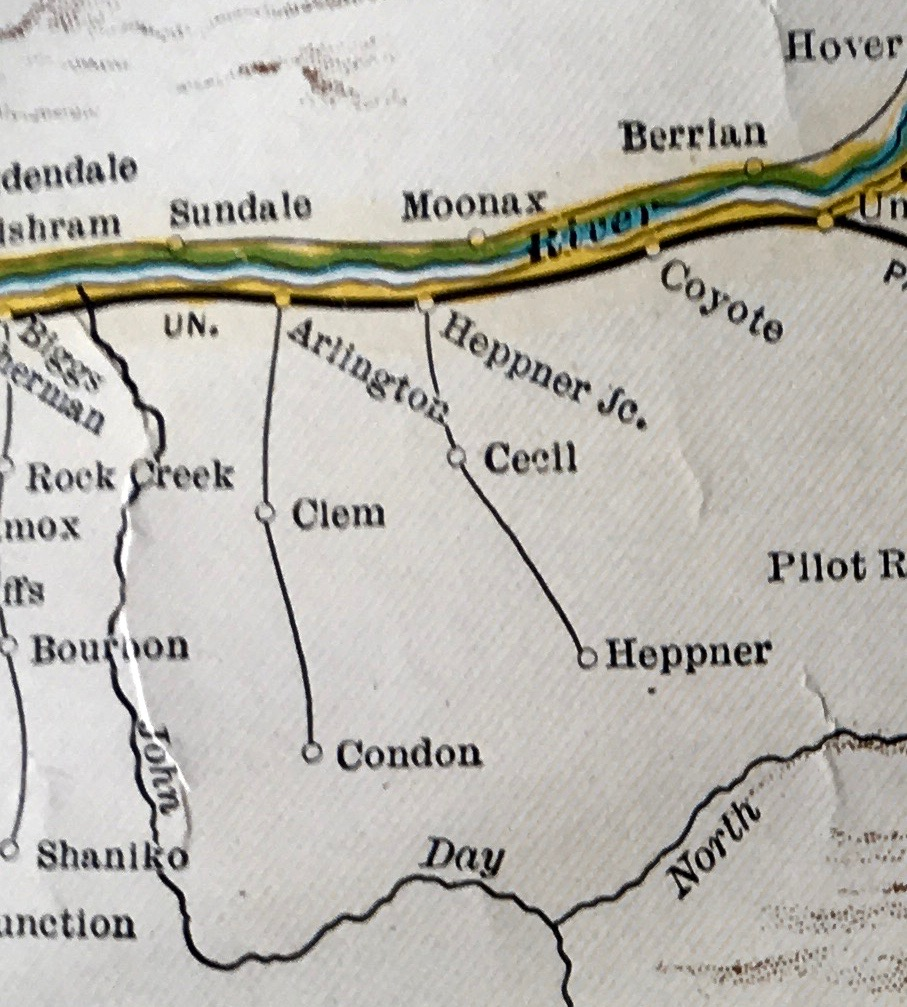
Route in 1931

The Columbia River and Oregon Central Railroad built a branch of the Oregon Railroad and Navigation Company (OR&N) from that company's main line at Arlington (on the Columbia River) south to Condon, Oregon, United States. The company was incorporated on August 22, 1903, and finished construction in 1905. A predecessor, Oregon Southern Railway, made surveys and acquired right-of-way, but did not begin construction. Always operated by the OR&N, the property of the Columbia River and Oregon Central Railroad, along with that of the OR&N, was sold to new Union Pacific Railroad (UP) subsidiary Oregon–Washington Railroad and Navigation Company on December 23, 1910. The Condon, Kinzua and Southern Railroad would complete a line from Condon to Kinzua in 1929.

The Interstate Commerce Commission authorized UP to abandon the line south of Gilliam in 1992. The remainder was leased to shortline Palouse River and Coulee City Railroad in 2003.

== See also ==
- List of defunct Oregon railroads
