= Marvin M. Brandt Revocable Trust v. United States =

Marvin Brandt Revocable Trust v. United States
- Supreme Court of the United States

Argued January 14, 2014 Decided March 10, 2014
- Full case name: Marvin M. Brandt Revocable Trust et al. v. United States
- Docket no.: 12–1173
- Citations: 572 U.S. 93 (more) 134 S. Ct. 1257; 188 L. Ed. 2d 272
- Argument: Oral argument

Case history
- Prior: On writ of certiorari to the United States Court of Appeals for the Tenth Circuit; United States v. Brandt, 496 F. App'x 822 (10th Cir. 2012) (per curiam)

Holding
- Rights of way under the 1875 Act are easements that terminate by the railroad's abandonment, leaving a private owner's land unburdened.

Court membership
- Chief Justice John Roberts Associate Justices Antonin Scalia · Anthony Kennedy; Clarence Thomas · Ruth Bader Ginsburg; Stephen Breyer · Samuel Alito; Sonia Sotomayor · Elena Kagan

Case opinions
- Majority: Roberts, joined by Scalia, Kennedy, Thomas, Ginsburg, Breyer, Alito, Kagan
- Dissent: Sotomayor

Laws applied
- 43 U.S.C. § 934

Marvin Brandt Revocable Trust v. United States, 572 U.S. 93 (2014), was a United States Supreme Court case in which the Court held that a railroad right-of-way granted under the General Railroad Right-of-Way Act of 1875 is an easement. Therefore, when a railroad abandons such a right-of-way, the easement disappears, and the land owner regains unburdened use of the land.

== Background ==
=== Historical context ===
From the Louisiana Purchase in 1803 to the Gadsden Purchase in 1853, the United States rapidly expanded westward. Responding to the California Gold Rush, Congress took steps to encourage the development, settlement, and full possession of the West. Doing so required reliable, efficient ways to transport people and property to and through them. Congress therefore passed numerous acts encouraging railroad development.

From 1850 to 1871, these acts typically allocated rights-of-way to specific named railroads. These rights-of-way were initially construed as an "absolute" grant in "both the fee and possession". Later they were construed to convey "a limited fee, made on an implied condition of reverter" to the United States if the railroad stopped using the land for railroad purposes.

Public opinion began to turn against these generous grants in the late 1860s. By the 1870s, legislators instead preferred to reserve public lands for settlers. An 1872 House resolution endorsed the change:

Resolved, that in the judgment of this House the policy of granting subsidies in public lands to railroads and other corporations ought to be discontinued, and that every consideration of public policy and equal justice to the whole people requires that the public lands should be held for the purpose of securing homesteads to actual settlers, and for educational purposes, as may be provided by law.

Starting in 1871, Congress began granting specific railroads right of way through public lands, with no accompanying land subsidies. The passing of railroad-specific legislation ended with the General Railroad Right-of-Way Act of 1875, generalizing the process to any qualified railroad. The 1875 Act's provisions for issuing new rights of way remained in effect until repealed in 1976.

=== Facts ===
In 1908 the Laramie Hahn's Peak & Pacific Railway Company acquired a right-of-way under the 1875 Act. LHP&P finished construction of a railroad along this right-of-way in 1911.

In 1976 Melvin and Lulu Brandt received a land patent from the United States for 83 acres in Fox Park, Wyoming within Medicine Bow National Forest. The patent conveyed fee simple title to the land, with several reservations. One reservation preserved LHP&P's right of way, stating the land grant was:

SUBJECT TO those rights for railroad purposes as have been granted to the Laramie Hahn's Peak & Pacific Railway Company, its successors or assigns by permit Cheyenne 04128 under the Act of March 3, 1875, 43 U.S.C. 934–939.

The railroad ultimately passed to the Wyoming and Colorado Railroad, who formally abandoned it (including the portion through Brandt's property) in 2004. The Forest Service proposed constructing what would later become the Medicine Bow Rail Trail along the right-of-way in 2005, and in 2006 the United States filed suit to quiet title to the right-of-way in its favor. The United States resolved its claims against all land owners but Brandt along the right of way.

Marvin Brandt (Melvin Brandt's son), represented by the Mountain States Legal Foundation, disputed the government's claim and filed a counterclaim on behalf of the family trust that owned the land. Brandt asserted that the railroad's right-of-way was an easement that had disappeared when the railroad abandoned it, leaving his land no longer burdened by the easement. The United States argued in response that the right-of-way instead reverted to the United States when abandoned by the railroad.

=== In lower courts ===
The District Court granted summary judgment to the United States. It acknowledged a circuit split among the Ninth Circuit, the Tenth Circuit, the Seventh Circuit, the Federal Circuit, and the Court of Federal Claims on the question of whether 1875 Act rights of way reverted to the United States on abandonment. The court, residing within the Tenth Circuit, then followed that circuit's precedent, ruling against Brandt and quieting title in the United States.

On appeal the Tenth Circuit affirmed. The court of appeals also acknowledged the circuit split while adhering to circuit precedent.

Brandt petitioned the Supreme Court for a writ of certiorari. The United States in response argued that the lower courts were correct, but the Court should nonetheless hear the case to resolve the circuit split.

On October 1, 2013, the Supreme Court agreed to hear the case.

== Supreme Court ==
=== Opinion ===
Writing for the majority, Chief Justice Roberts held that the railroad rights-of-way granted under the 1875 Act are common law easements, which upon termination leave the underlying land unburdened.

Roberts observed that the United States lost its case largely because it had successfully argued in Great Northern Railway Co. v. United States, 315 U.S. 262 (1942), that 1875 Act rights of way were easements. In that case Great Northern had wished to drill for oil and gas upon its right of way. At the Supreme Court, the United States argued that the language, legislative history, and subsequent construction of the 1875 Act confirmed that only an easement (which would not permit drilling) had been granted. The Court agreed with the United States. Roberts declined to endorse the United States's "stark change in position".

Roberts also observed that Great Northern "specifically disavowed" the characterization of 1875 Act rights-of-way as reverting to the United States on abandonment in Rio Grande Western R. Co. v. Stringham, 239 U.S. 44 (1915). (This case and Northern Pac. Ry. Co. v. Townsend, 190 U.S. 267 (1903), had been key precedents in the United States's argument.) The Court in Great Northern considered Stringham not "controlling" because the Stringham Court had seemingly made its decision without being informed of the policy shift from land subsidies to mere easements in 1871.

Roberts went on to write that under well-settled property law, an easement disappears upon abandonment, and the land owner regains full use of his property. Therefore, when the United States patented land to Brandt subject to the railroad right-of-way, without explicitly reserving any interest in the right-of-way, it gave up any future interest in the railroad corridor. In this case, the railroad's easement was extinguished upon abandonment, leaving Brandt's land unburdened.

=== Dissent ===
Dissenting alone, Justice Sotomayor argued that the Court had misconstrued Northern Pac. Ry. Co. v. Townsend, 190 U.S. 267 (1903), and Rio Grande Western R. Co. v. Stringham, 239 U.S. 44 (1915). Where the majority argued Great Northern "disavowed" those cases, Sotomayor instead read Great Northern to hold that "the right of way did not confer one particular attribute of fee title."

Sotomayor argued that the majority was wrong to analyze the rights of way under the common law. Instead she concluded that traditional common law terms acquire different meanings in the unique context of railroad rights of way.

Sotomayor also disagreed that the United States's position contradicted its position in Great Northern, pointing to language in its brief in Great Northern that qualified its description of the rights of way as easements.

Sotomayor in closing criticized the decision for "undermin[ing] the legality of thousands of miles of former rights of way that the public now enjoys as means of transportation and recreation", noting that ensuing lawsuits "may well cost American taxpayers hundreds of millions of dollars" in rail trail-related takings claims.

== Subsequent developments ==
At oral argument neither the United States nor Brandt could say how many abandoned rights of way would be affected by a decision in Brandt's favor, due to the age of the rights of way and the distributed manner in which records had been kept. It is thus unclear how many new takings claims will be filed in response to the decision.

Assessments of the impact of the decision upon existing rail-trails vary. The Rails-to-Trails Conservancy has argued that relatively few existing rail-trails will be affected by the Court's decision. Some states believe their trails will be unaffected. Others remain uncertain about the decision's impact on existing trails.

The Court's decision has also had impact beyond the rail-trail context, strongly influencing a proposed settlement in Texas litigation over railroads' allowing telecommunication companies to lay fiber-optic cable within rights of way.
