= List of tunnels documented by the Historic American Engineering Record in Oregon =

This is a list of tunnels documented by the Historic American Engineering Record in the US state of Oregon.

== Tunnels ==
Survey No.	Name (as assigned by HAER)	Built	Documented	Carries	Crosses	Location	County	Coordinates
OR-3	Portland and Southwestern Railroad Tunnel	1910	1982	Portland and Southwestern Railroad	Nehalem Divide	Chapman	Columbia	45°49′56″N 123°03′02″W
OR-36-L	Historic Columbia River Highway, Oneonta Tunnel	1914	1995	Historic Columbia River Highway	Oneonta Point	Troutdale	Multnomah	45°35′23″N 122°04′29″W
OR-36-O	Historic Columbia River Highway, Toothrock Tunnel	1932	1995	Historic Columbia River Highway	Toothrock	Troutdale	Multnomah	45°38′18″N 121°56′09″W
OR-36-R	Historic Columbia River Highway, Mitchell Point Tunnel and Viaduct	1915	1995	Historic Columbia River Highway	Lower Mitchell Point	Troutdale	Multnomah	45°42′15″N 121°37′01″W
OR-36-T	Historic Columbia River Highway, Mosier Twin Tunnels	1920	1995	Historic Columbia River Highway	Unnamed point	Troutdale	Multnomah	45°41′06″N 121°25′18″W
OR-92	Southern Pacific Railroad Natron Cutoff, Tunnel 3	1925	1997	Southern Pacific Railroad, Cascade Subdivision	Pengra Pass	Odell Lake	Klamath	43°35′21″N 122°03′07″W
OR-93	Southern Pacific Railroad Natron Cutoff, Tunnel 5	1927	1997	Southern Pacific Railroad, Cascade Subdivision	Unnamed point	McCredie Springs	Lane	43°37′18″N 122°09′23″W
OR-94	Southern Pacific Railroad Natron Cutoff, Tunnel 22	1910	1997	Southern Pacific Railroad, Cascade Subdivision	Unnamed ridge	Oakridge	Lane	43°44′59″N 122°29′04″W
OR-95	Southern Pacific Railroad Natron Cutoff, Tunnel 23	1910	1997	Southern Pacific Railroad, Cascade Subdivision	Unnamed point	Westfir	Lane	43°47′36″N 122°32′46″W

== See also ==
- List of bridges documented by the Historic American Engineering Record in Oregon
