= Modoc Northern Railroad =

Former railroad company in California

The Modoc Northern Railroad (reporting mark MNRR) is a defunct railroad company that operated over 160 miles (260 km) of track in northeastern California and southern Oregon and was based in Tulelake, California. The railroad connected Klamath Falls to Alturas, California, and Lakeview, Oregon, to Alturas, California. The railroad shipped mostly timber products and some perlite from the mine and mill near Lakeview.

The rails used by the Modoc Northern were first laid out in June 1927 by a non-operating subsidiary of the Southern Pacific Company with the same name. On November 1, 2005, Union Pacific Railroad leased the Modoc line, connecting Klamath Falls to Alturas, to the MNRR for five years. By request of the Lake County, Oregon, commissioners, the MNRR also took over operation of the Lake County Railway, connecting Alturas to Lakeview, in 2006. UP cancelled the lease on May 5, 2009, and a new operator has assumed control of the Lake County Railroad.
