= Wyoming Colorado Railroad =

Shortline railroad company

The Wyoming Colorado Railroad (reporting mark WYCO) was a shortline railroad formerly operating three separate divisions in Colorado, Wyoming, and Oregon. Of the original system, only the Oregon division is still in operation as the Oregon Eastern Railroad. WYCO was one of several shortline railroads operated by The Western Group of Ogden, Utah.

In 2014, the U.S. Supreme Court ruled that the right of way to abandoned tracks in Wyoming reverted to the property owner, in Marvin M. Brandt Revocable Trust v. United States.
