= Willamette Valley Southern Railway =

Former railroad in Oregon, United States

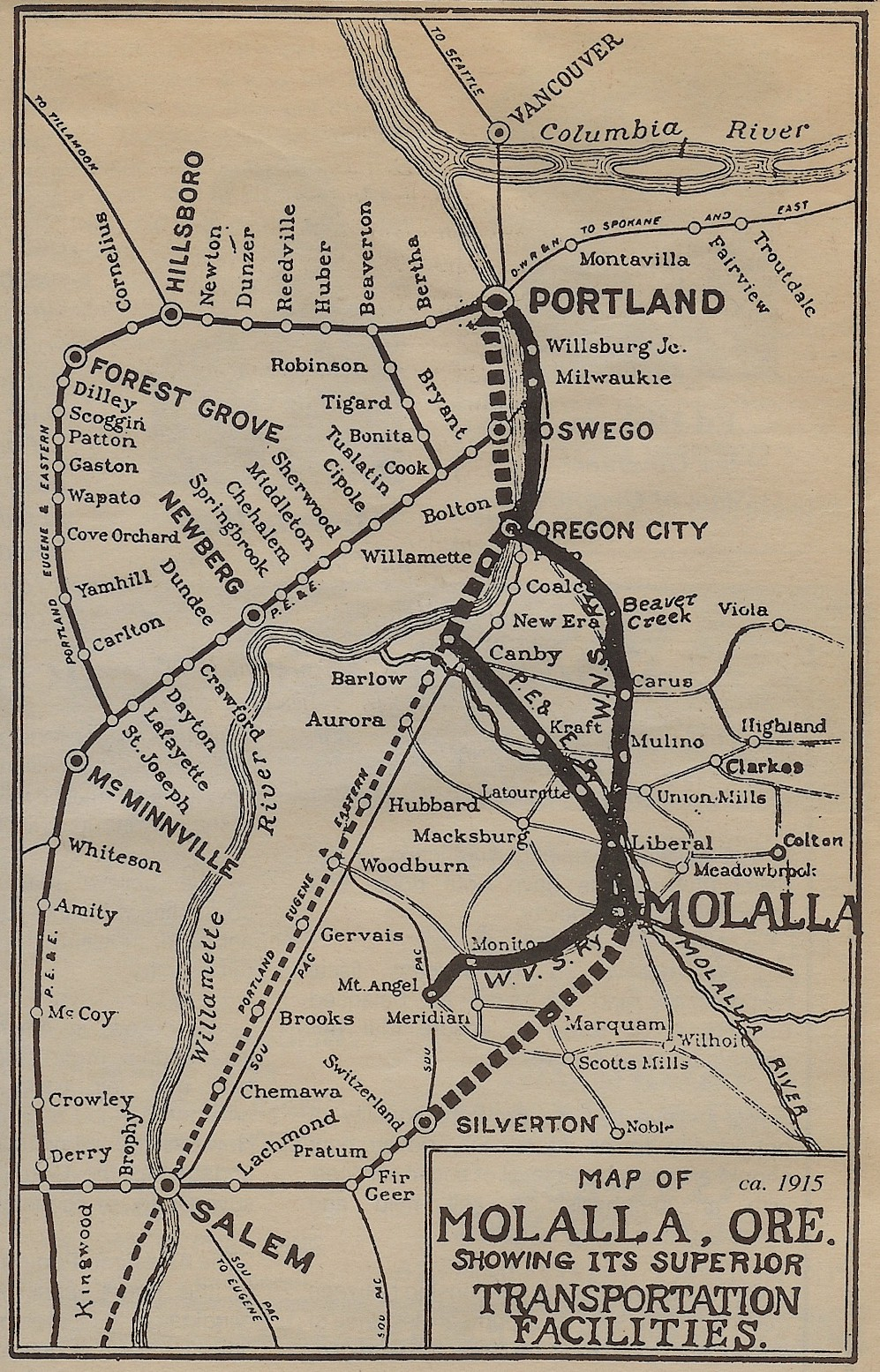
Map or Railroads and roads near Molalla, Ore. Including WVS.

The Willamette Valley Southern Railway was a railroad in Oregon that ran from Portland, Oregon, where it connected to the trolley line, through Molalla, Oregon, where it connected to the Eastern & Western Logging Railroad as well as Southern Pacific, to Mt. Angel, Oregon. The line was reorganized from the Clackamas Southern after facing financial troubles in 1915 and closed in 1933. Like many short lines of Oregon at the time, it ran off electricity from hydroelectric dams. For the last three years the line stopped just outside of Molalla. Only 400 feet of the railroad remains intact, nudged over a few feet from its original position of the Oregon Pacific Railroad.

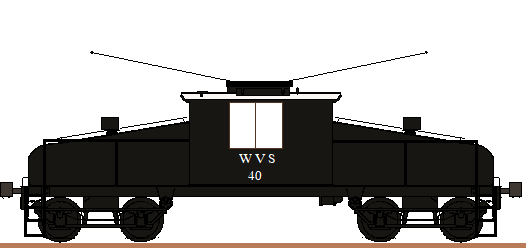
Drawn Sideview of a freight motor.

The Railroad used ALCo freight motors, as well as electric passenger cars similar to today's lightrail train cars. No original depots remain except a replica shelter north of Molalla. The railroad was sustained by logging operations in Molalla and when those ended in 1933 the railroad went bankrupt. Evidence of the former route is most prevalent in and south of Molalla

List of stops on the line, north to south: Golf Junction, Hendee, Milwaukie, Lakewood, Oak Grove, Naef, Ashdale, Meldrum, Gladstone, Oregon City Robbins, Beaver Creek, Ingram, Spangler, Buckner Creek, Mulino, Liberal (connection with Southern Pacific, only remaining portion of the line now a spur) (Depot closed in the 1920s), Molalla (connection with Eastern & Western Logging Line), Kaylor.

- (Past this point closed in 1930)

Yoder, Monitor, Mt. Angel (terminus with loop track, also connection to Southern Pacific).
