= Rogue Valley Terminal Railroad Corporation =

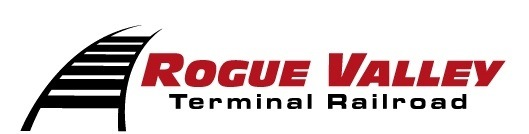

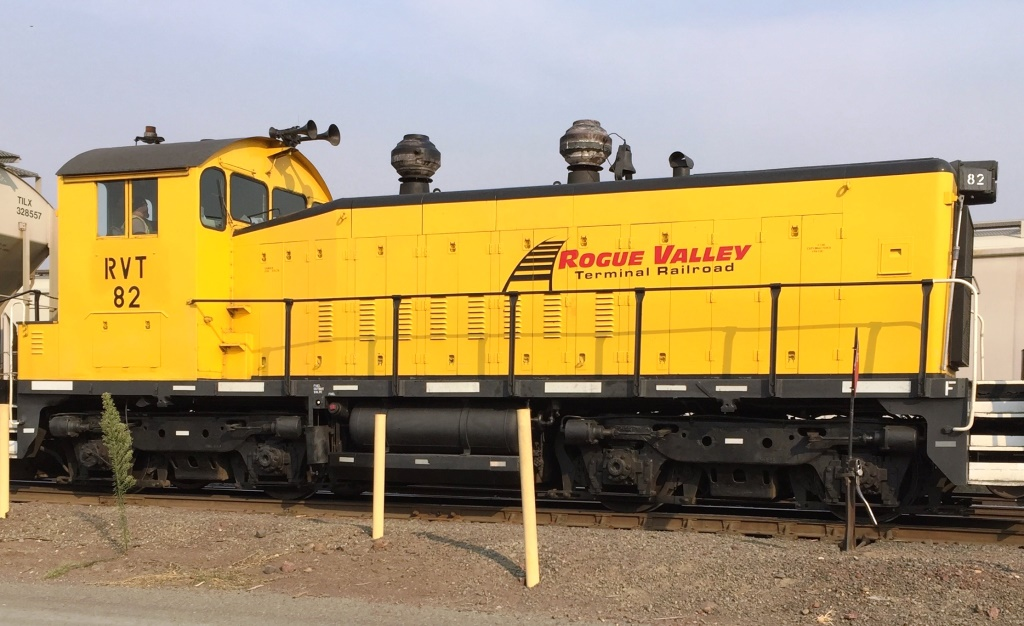
- RVT SW1200 Locomotive (#82) switching at White City, Oregon on October 10, 2017

Overview
- Stations operated: White City, Oregon
- Parent company: CCT Rail System Corporation
- Headquarters: White City, Oregon
- Key people: Scott DeVries, President
- Reporting mark: RVT
- Locale: Southern Oregon
- Dates of operation: March 15, 2013–present
- Predecessor: WCTU Railway LLC

Technical
- Track gauge: 4 ft 8 1/2 in (1,435 mm) standard gauge
- Length: 14 miles (23 km)
- Operating speed: 5-10 MPH

Other
- Website: www.roguevalleyrr.com

The Rogue Valley Terminal Railroad Corporation (reporting mark RVT) is a 14-mile (23 km) shortline railroad that connects the industrial park in White City, Oregon, United States, to the Central Oregon & Pacific Railroad, Inc., which hauls RVT cars to the Union Pacific Railroad Company at Eugene, Oregon, or Black Butte, California, via the Siskiyou Summit, or to the Yreka Western Railroad at Montague, California.

== History ==
The line began operations in 1951 as a division of the White City Corporation, providing tenants of the new Medford Industrial Park (formerly US Army Cantonment Camp White) with contract rail switching services and a local connection to the Southern Pacific Transportation Company. The railroad was formally incorporated as an independent common carrier railroad on November 3, 1954, as the White City Terminal & Utilities Co..

In December 1974, the railroad was purchased by the Union Tank Car Company. Union Tank Car renamed the railroad the WCTU Railway Company effective January 1975.

Berkshire Hathaway Inc. gained indirect control of the railroad with the 2008 purchase of Marmon Transportation Services LLC (the parent company of Union Tank Car Company).

On December 17, 2012, Marmon Transportation Services announced the sale of WCTU Railway LLC to RVTR Rail Holdings LLC, a holding company owned by Scott DeVries of Superior, Wisconsin.

On March 15, 2013, the railroad was renamed Rogue Valley Terminal Railroad Corporation, and the holding company owner was renamed the CCT Rail System Corporation.

== Operations ==
The railroad operates two EMD diesel-electric switcher locomotives (only one unit is used at any given time, with the other unit held in reserve). Operations are conducted Monday through Friday (excluding holidays) with one train crew.

== Traffic ==
The railroad's main commodities transported are asphalt, cement, chemicals and forest products.

== Locomotive Fleet ==
| Unit Number(s) | Own/Lease | Locomotive Model | Total Quantity |
|---|---|---|---|
| RVT 82 | Owned | EMD SW1200 | 1 |
| RVT 99 | Owned | EMD SW1500 | 1 |
| RVT 2357 | Owned | EMD SD60M | 1 |
| | | Fleet total | 3 |
