= Lake County Railroad =

Railroad in Oregon, United States

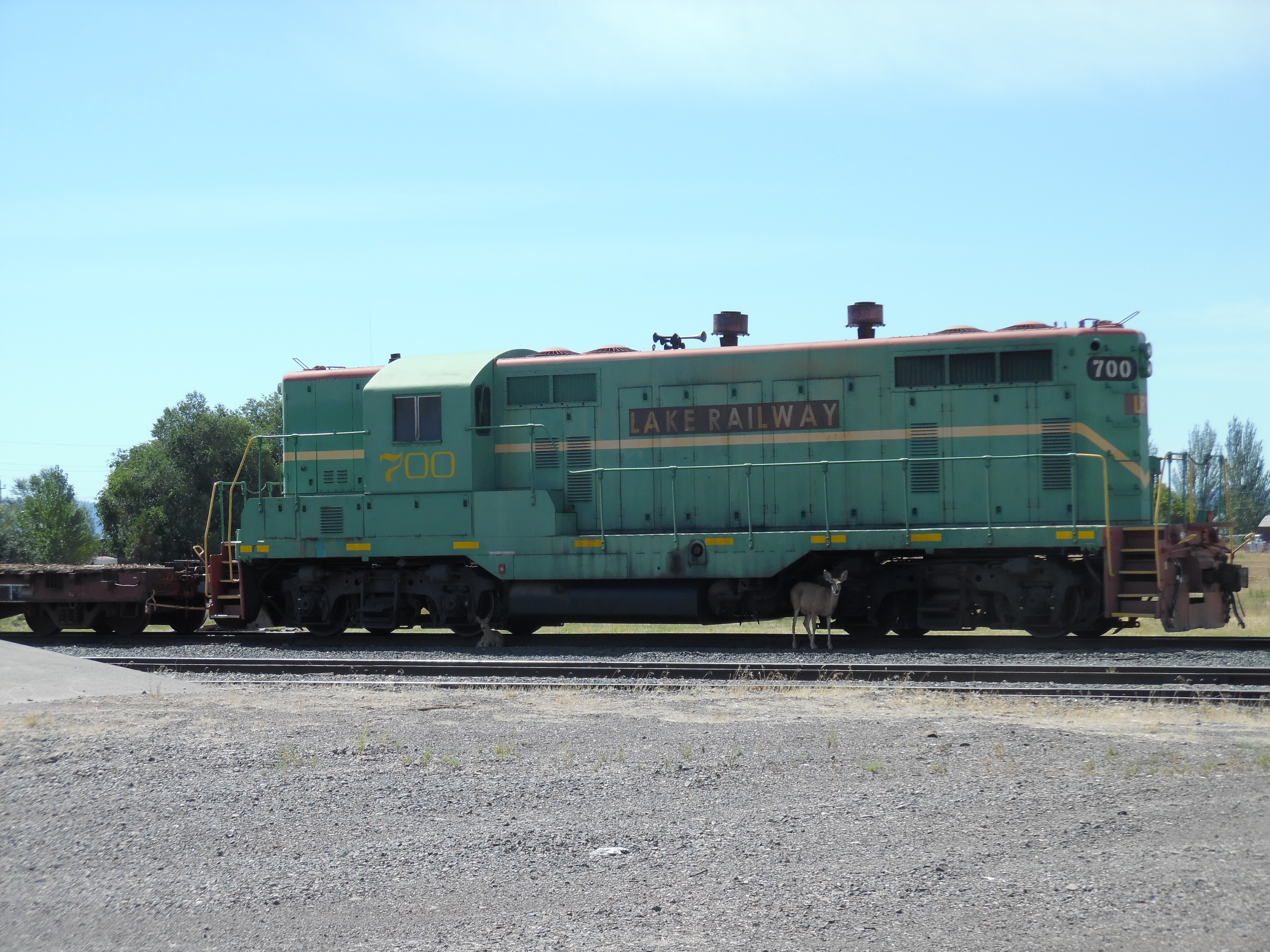
- Lake County Railroad Engine 700

Overview
- Headquarters: Lakeview, Oregon
- Reporting mark: LRY
- Locale: Central Oregon
- Dates of operation: 1997–2017
- Predecessor: Nevada–California–Oregon Railway and Southern Pacific
- Successor: Goose Lake Railway LLC

Technical
- Length: 54-mile (87 km)

Other
- Website: Lake County Railroad

The Lake County Railroad (reporting mark LRY) was a railroad based in Lakeview, Oregon, United States, owned by the Lake County government and operated by various contract operators during its 20-year existence. The county-owned line running from Lakeview, OR to Alturas, CA is now leased to Nexxt Rail LLC and operated as the Goose Lake Railway LLC since Summer 2017.

== Traffic ==
- Lumber
- Perlite
- Wood chips

== Motive Power ==
LCR No.	Engine Type	Builder No.	Date Built	Previous Owners
700	GP7u	18604	August 1953	ex-CLC 700:2; ex-CWWR 776; ex-WTCX 776; ex-NW 2436; née NKP 436
1617	GP7	18977	December 1953	ex-GWR 1617; ex-BN 1617; née CBQ 261
1761	GP9	19110	January 1954	ex-WRIX 1761; ex-SJVR 1761; ex-SJVR 101; ex-SDAE 101; née UP 224

== History ==
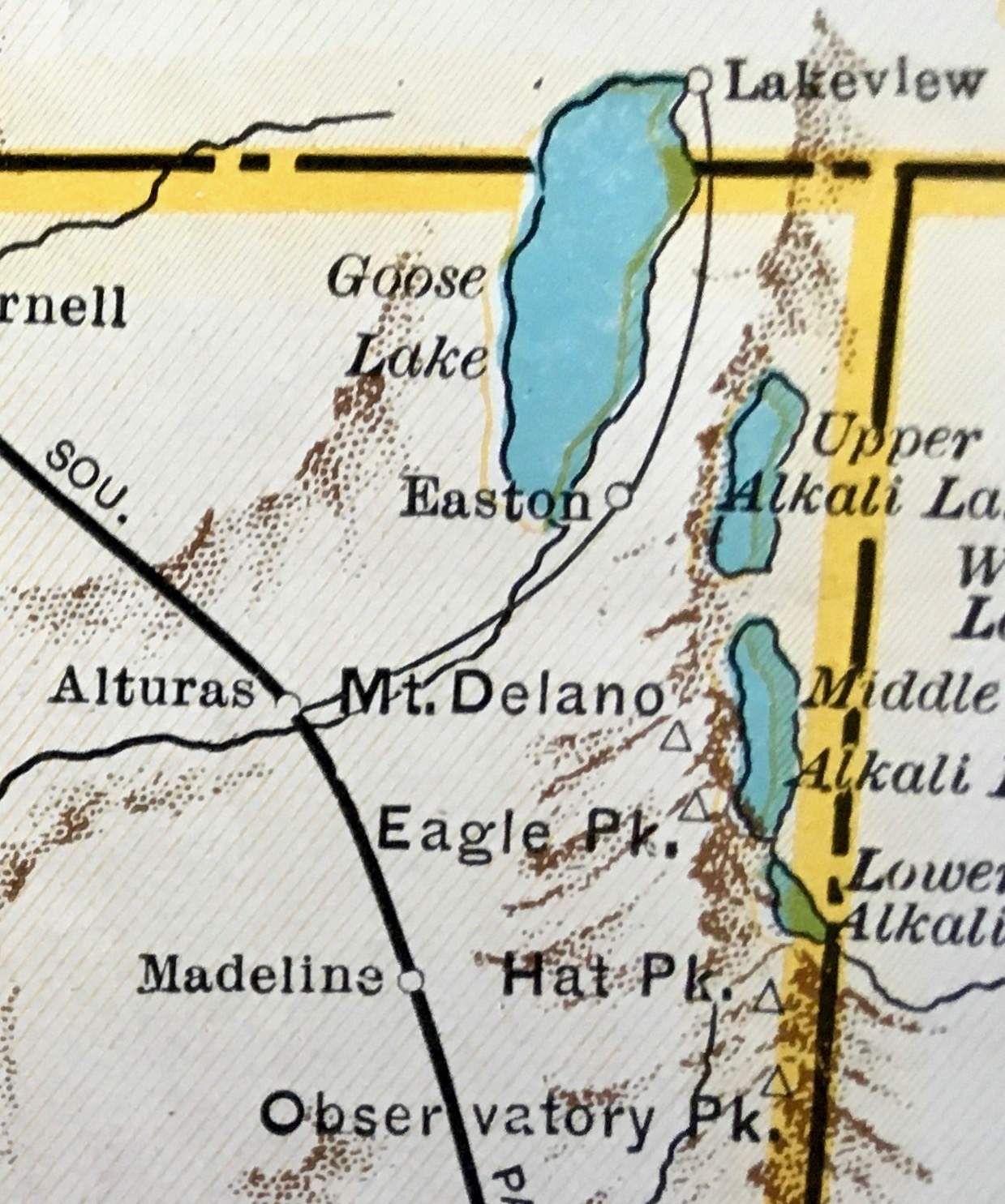
Route at time of being absorbed in 1929

The line was originally part of the narrow gauge Nevada–California–Oregon Railway (NCO) and was constructed around 1908. In 1926 the NCO became an operating subsidiary of the Southern Pacific Railroad (SP). By 1929 the NCO was entirely operated by the SP.

In March 1985 the SP filed to abandon the line and the abandonment was approved 5 months later. The county stepped in to save the route, vital to local businesses and the state legislature enacted a law permitting local governments to own railroads outside of the state, and then the Oregon State Lottery agreed to fund up to 85% of the purchase price if the county could find an operator. The county went to work, and the Great Western Railway, an established shortline based out of Colorado, agreed to operate the line on a contract basis. Lake County purchased the line from SP on January 18, 1986, to keep the line open.

The LCR began operations on November 1, 1997, when it took over the 54.45 miles (87.63 km) formerly operated by the Great Western Railway of Colorado under contract. The county operated the rail line on precarious financial footing with frequent derailments and grants needed for maintenance funding.

The line was leased in 2005 to the Modoc Northern Railroad. During the Modoc Northern years, a lot of investment was made in rail infrastructure to shore up the line and try to eliminate the frequent derailments that plagued the route, but train speed was still limited to 10 mph (16 km/h) for most of the line.

Following the Modoc Northern's failure in 2009, Lake County contracted with Frontier Rail, who operated the Lake County line from Lakeview to Alturas, as well as the Union Pacific's line from Alturas to Perez, CA, as the LRY LLC (d.b.a Lake Railway). Lake County subsequently terminated the lease with Frontier Rail in September 2017 after a lengthy contractual dispute and litigation. Lake County subsequently contracted with the current operator Nexxt Rail LLC, who continues to operate the Lake County-owned Lakeview to Alturas line as Goose Lake Railway LLC. The Alturas to Perez UP-owned line segment reverted to operation by UP at the end of 2019.
