= United Railways (Oregon) =

Railway line in Oregon

United Railways was a railroad in Oregon. Begun as an electric interurban railway in 1911, passenger service was never effective and the road became a freight link to the Tualatin Valley. The company was dissolved in 1944, but the railroad line remains active.

== History ==
Initially built as an interurban electric railway, the main line opened on April 16, 1911 between Portland and Wilkesboro. Unusual for interurbans, the line featured a long 4,107-foot (1,252 m) tunnel beneath Cornelius Pass. The company had a close working relationship with the Oregon Electric Railway. As such, when the Oregon Electric changed their electrification voltage in 1912, United Railways implemented the same system. Service south of Linnton was suspended in 1915 amid a fare dispute, necessitating passengers wishing to continue to Portland to transfer to mainline Spokane, Portland and Seattle Railway trains. As passenger traffic declined, the company looked to local lumber processors to support business. Additional branch railroads were built from Wilkesboro in 1920 which facilitated the increased freight business. The Gales Creek and Wilson River Railroad built a line west to Glenwood and, after a failed attempt to purchase UR, interchanged freight. The Portland, Astoria and Pacific Railroad further built a route north to Keasey and began leasing the United Railways line. While the line was initially planned to extend to Tillamook, the only extension beyond Wilkesboro was in the 1920s when rails were run to Banks. Passenger service ceased after January 18, 1923. The railroad continued to operate as a freight line, but the electrification system was removed in favor of diesel locomotives. The company interchanged logs on disconnected trucks. The SP&S purchased and dissolved the company outright in 1944. The main line persisted as a freight line, eventually passing into the ownership of Portland and Western Railroad.

== See also ==
- Holcomb Creek Trestle
