= Oregon Eastern Railroad =

Former railroad in Oregon

Overview
- Headquarters: Vale, Oregon
- Reporting mark: OERR
- Locale: Oregon, United States

Technical
- Track gauge: 4 ft 8 1/2 in (1,435 mm) standard gauge

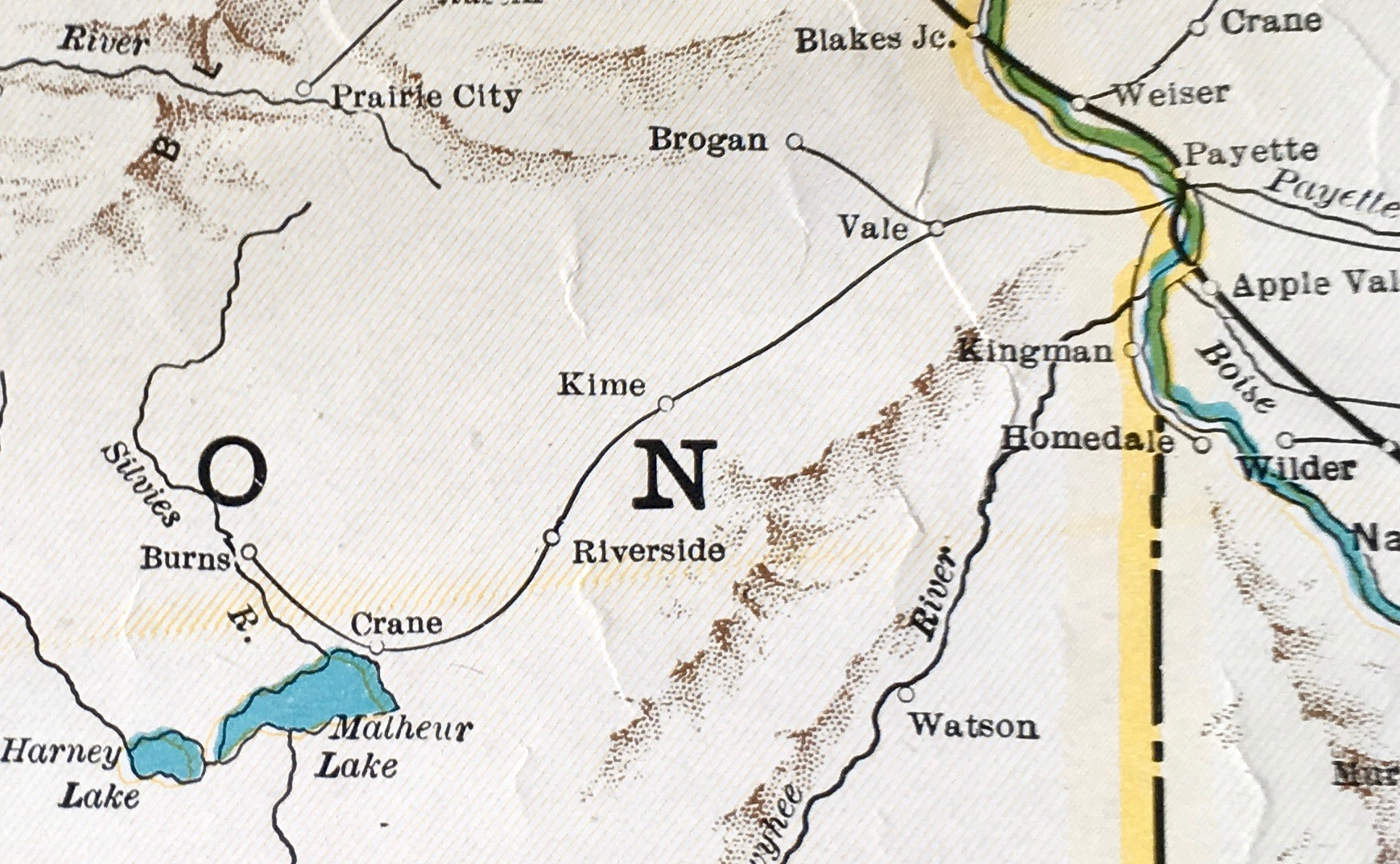
Burns was linked to Vale and Brogan.

The Oregon Eastern Railroad (OERR) is a railroad going from Ontario to EP Mineral's Celetom plant (Halfway between Vale and Harper). The railroad is all that is left of the Wyoming Colorado Railroad which started out as the Malheur Valley Railway. The railroad promotes itself as a "safe, reliable and economical method of transportation" and is proud of the fuel efficiency of railroads.

== History ==
=== Malheur Valley Railway ===
Malheur Valley Railway built a 23.74-mile (38.21 km) branch line of the Oregon Short Line Railroad (OSL), beginning at that company's main line south of Ontario, Oregon, U.S., and extending west through the valley of the Malheur River to Vale, then northwest to Brogan. The company was incorporated on January 26, 1906, and opened its first section of road on January 15, 1907, under lease to the OSL, then an operating subsidiary of the Union Pacific Railroad. Construction between Vale and Brogan was aided by the Willow River Land and Irrigation Company. On December 23, 1910, new UP subsidiary Oregon–Washington Railroad and Navigation Company (OWR&N) acquired the property of the Malheur Valley Railway, but the line continued to be operated under lease by the OSL. The OWR&N subsequently built a line west from Vale, eventually reaching Burns, and also leased this Ontario–Burns Branch to the OSL. (This became moot in 1936, when the UP leased the OSL and OWR&N.)

The line eventually expanded north from Burns into what is now the Malheur National Forest, where it split up into several branches.

=== WYCO ===
In November 1989, the Wyoming Colorado Railroad bought the entire Ontario–Burns Branch, including the old Malheur Valley Railway east of Vale, and abandoned the portion east of Celatom in June 1992. In spring 1993 WYCO started removing the line and UP filed a lawsuit against them. The settlement allowed UP to salvage the line after milepost 78.

=== Current ownership ===
On November 1, 2020, the OERR was sold by The Western Group to Jaguar Transport Holdings of Joplin, Missouri.

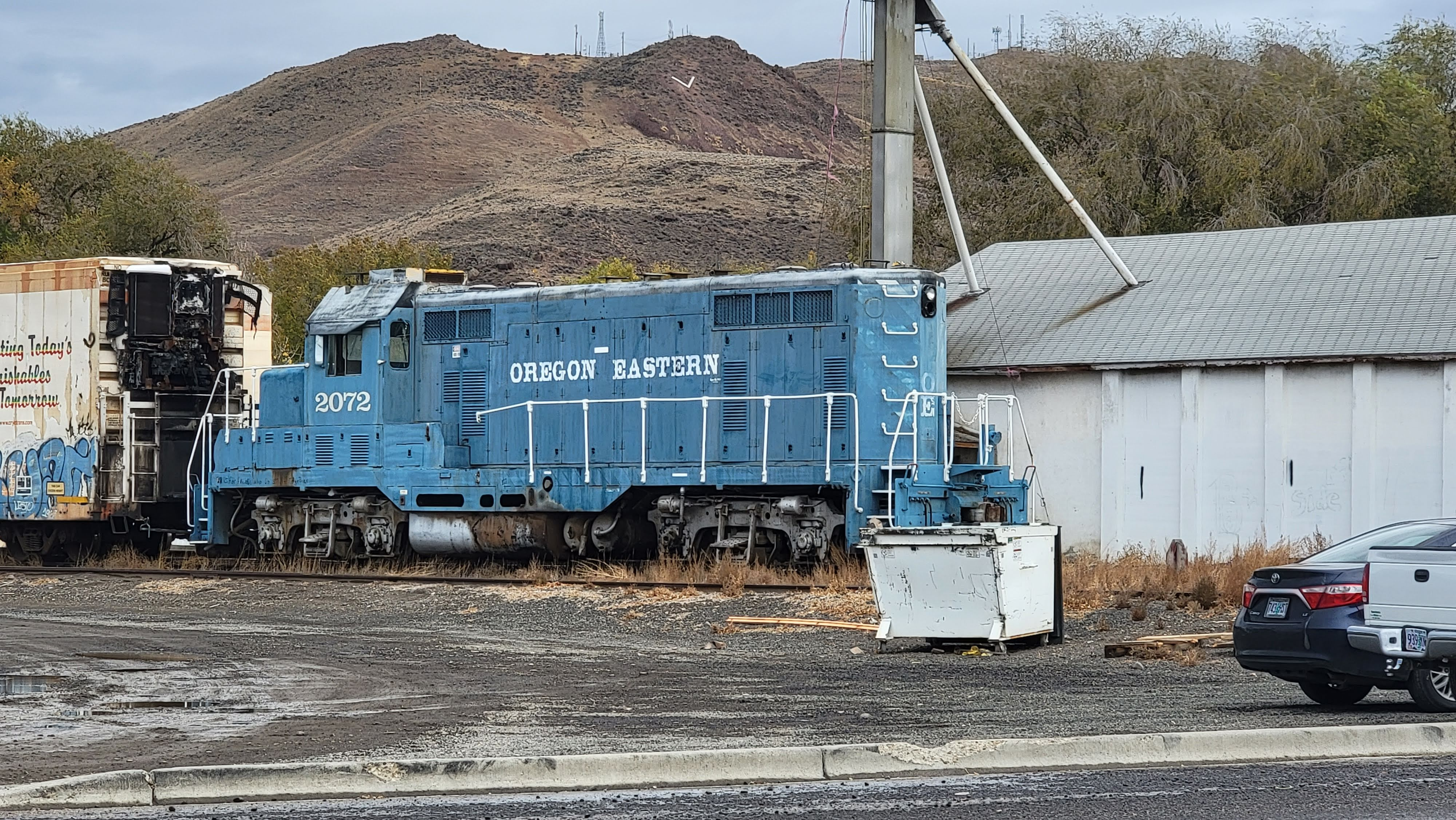
Ex-Grand Canyon Railway gp7u locomotive #2072

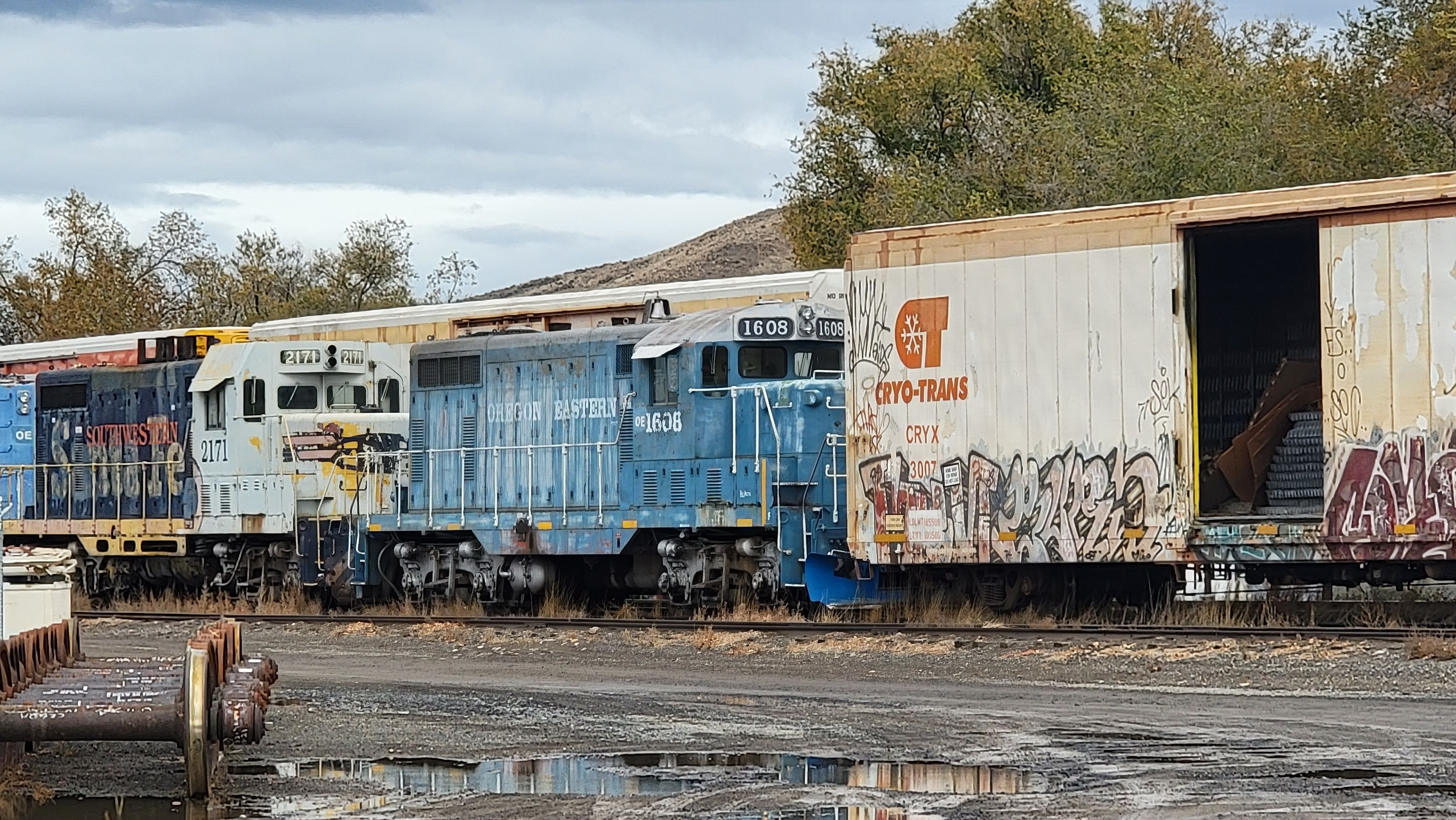
Ex-Michigan Northern Railway gp7 locomotive #1608 and Ex-Santa Fe gp7u locomotive #2171

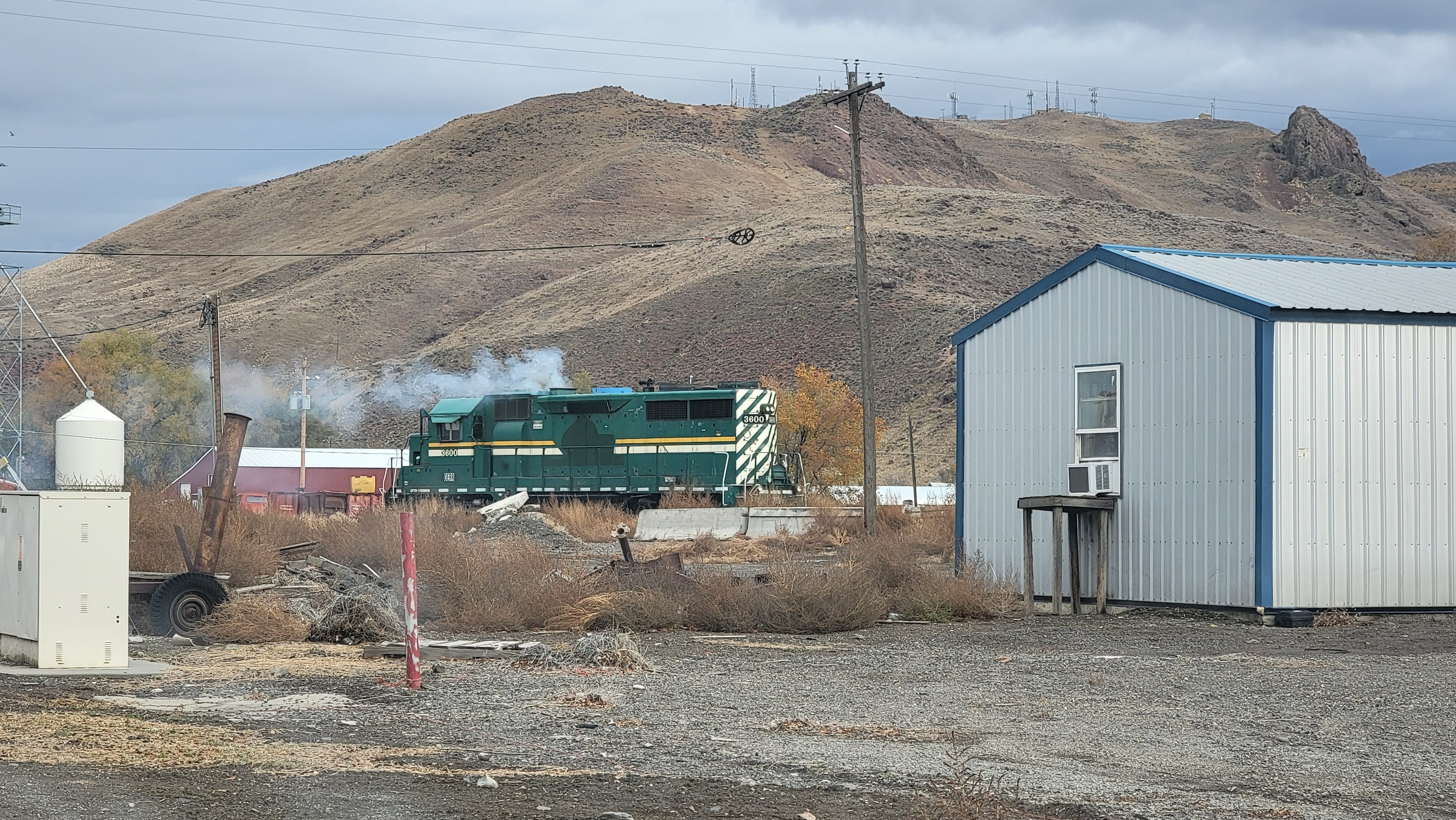
Ex-Hudson Bay Railway gp35 locomotive #3600

== See also ==
- List of defunct Oregon railroads
- Jaguar Transport Holdings
- Jaguar Transport Holdings | Eastern Oregon Railroad
