= Oregon Trunk Line =

Railroad in Oregon and Washington

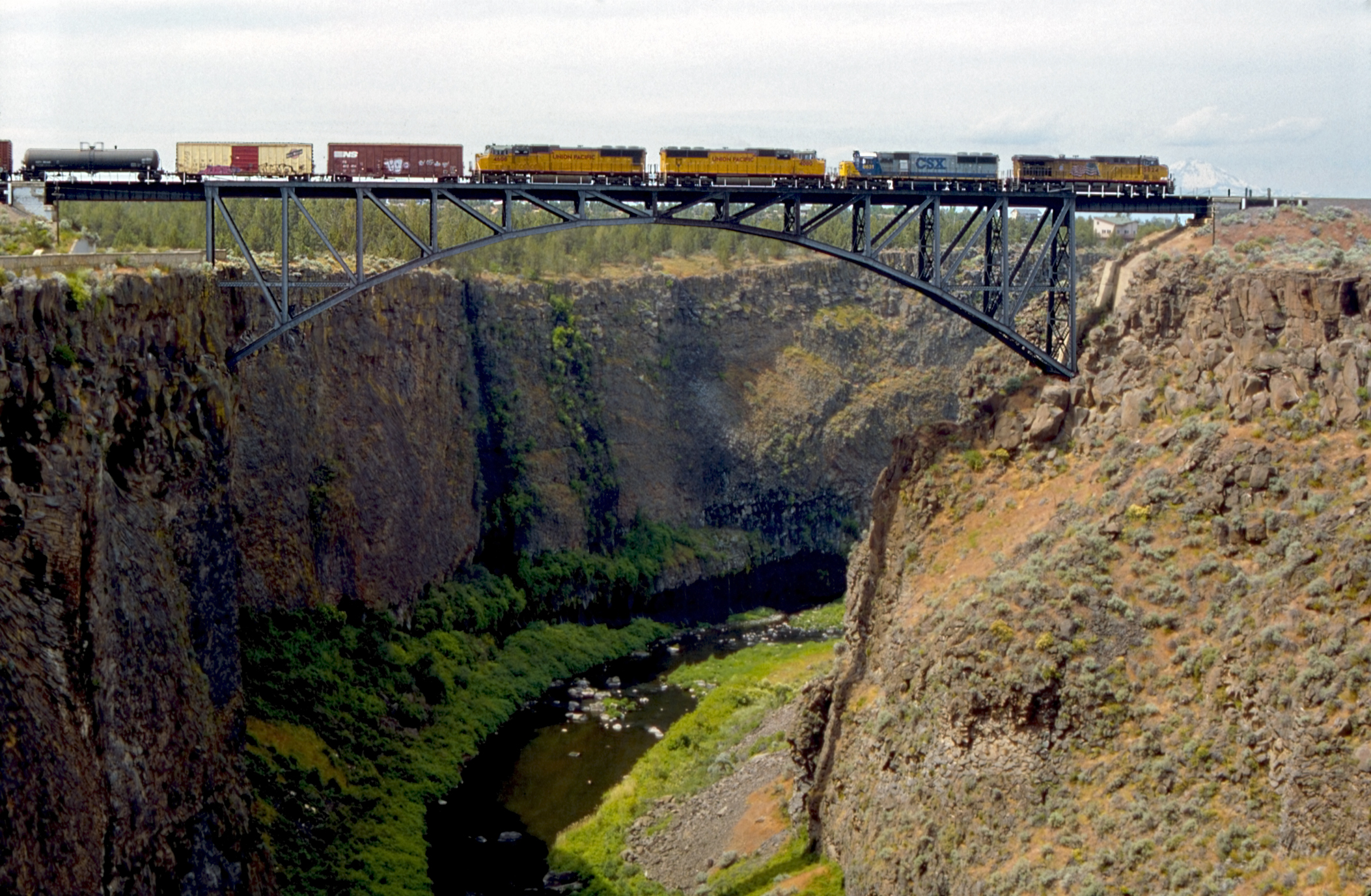
A train traverses the Crooked River Railroad Bridge, 2005

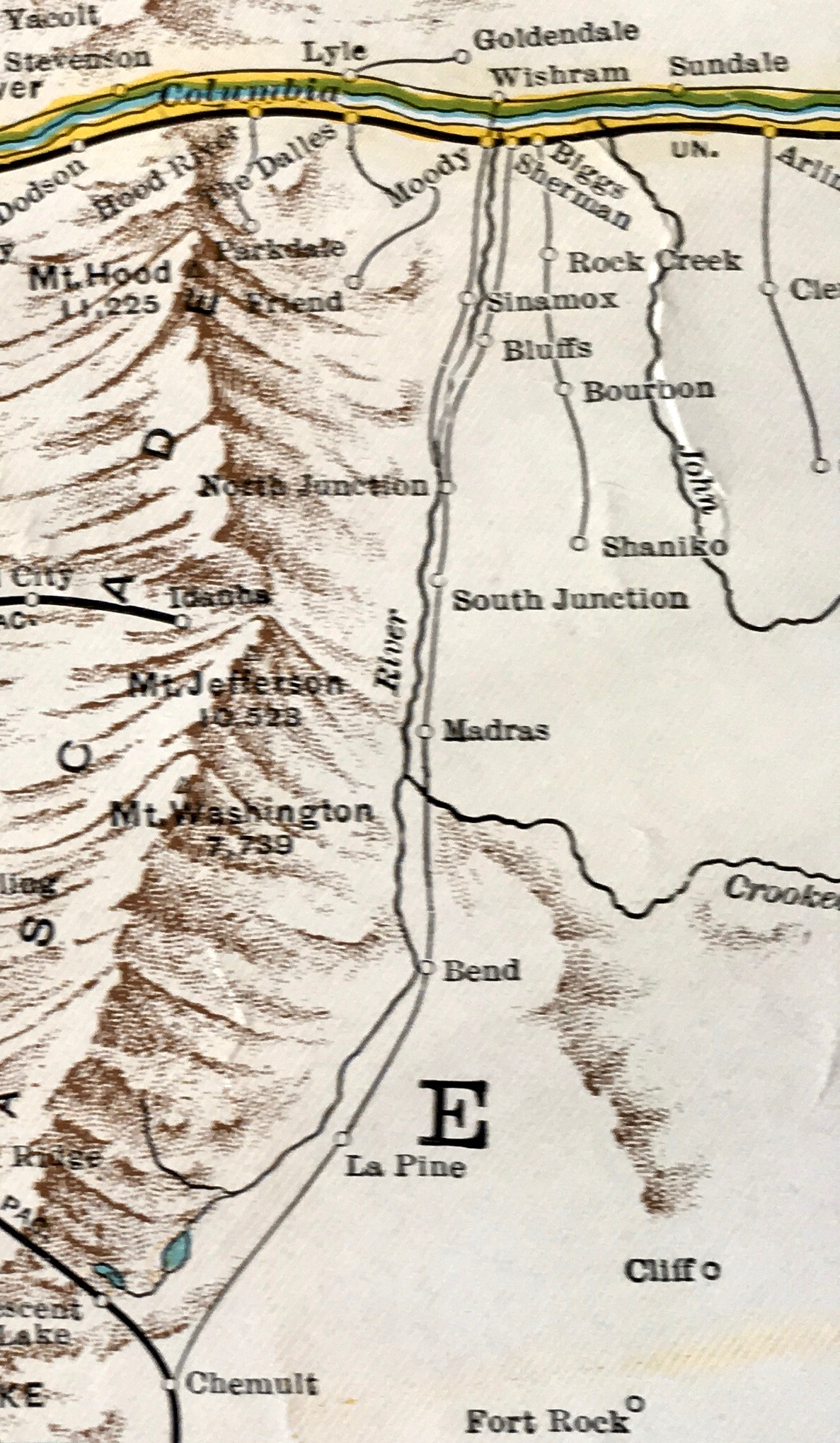
Map of the Oregon Trunk Line, 1931

The Oregon Trunk Line is a railway line in Oregon and Washington operated by the BNSF Railway. It is a remnant of the Spokane, Portland and Seattle Railway, running from Wishram, Washington in the north to a connection with the Union Pacific at Chemult at its south end. Connections to the Gateway Subdivision are facilitated by trackage rights over the Union Pacific Cascade Subdivision to Klamath Falls.

== History ==
The Oregon Trunk Line railroad surveyed the route in 1906, with the golden spike driven at Bend on October 5, 1911. It was built with competition from the Deschutes Railroad Company, which laid their tracks on the eastern bank of the Deschutes River. The competing companies' workers became embroiled in a Railroad War during construction, with attacks involving dynamite, guns, and general brawls. A truce was called in 1909 to allow the two to build a joint track through the narrow Deschutes River Valley. Northern Pacific Railway and Great Northern Railway agreed to extend the line south of Bend to Klamath Falls in 1927. The order was finalized the following year with Great Northern additionally acquiring trackage rights on the Southern Pacific line between Chemult and Klamath Falls.

Passenger services along the line ended in 1971 with the formation of Amtrak.
