= WCTU Railway =

WCTU Railway LLC
Overview
- Headquarters: White City, Oregon
- Reporting mark: WCTR
- Locale: Southern Oregon
- Dates of operation: November 3, 1954–March 14, 2013
- Predecessor: Southern Pacific Railroad
- Successor: Rogue Valley Terminal Railroad Corporation

Technical
- Track gauge: 4 ft 8 1/2 in (1,435 mm) standard gauge

The WCTU Railway LLC (reporting mark WCTR) was a 13-mile (21 km) shortline railroad that connects White City, Oregon, United States to a junction north of Medford with the Central Oregon and Pacific Railroad, which hauls its cars to the Union Pacific Railroad at Eugene or Black Butte. The line began operations on November 20, 1954, on an abandoned Southern Pacific Transportation Company right-of-way as the White City Terminal & Utilities Co., and was renamed after the Union Tank Car Company bought it in 1974. WCTU Railway was owned by Marmon Transportation Services LLC, a unit of Berkshire Hathaway.

Around 2000, WCTU acquired the engine RSS SW1200 #82 (formerly RF&P 82). After waiting for about a year before it was ready for service, it became the No. 1 power, with #5119 as back-up, while the 5117 was basically out of service. About 2004 they received another SW1200 engine, the 1503. Now WCTU uses one unit for a month, then swaps units. The 5119 is still operable, but the 5117 needs work.

On December 17, 2012, Marmon Transportation announced the sale of WCTU Railway LLC to RVTR Rail Holdings (now CCT Rail System Corporation), a holding company owned by Scott DeVries of Superior, Wisconsin. The railway is now known as Rogue Valley Terminal Railroad Corporation (RVT).
