= Wilkesboro, Oregon =

Unincorporated community in the state of Oregon, United States

- Unincorporated community
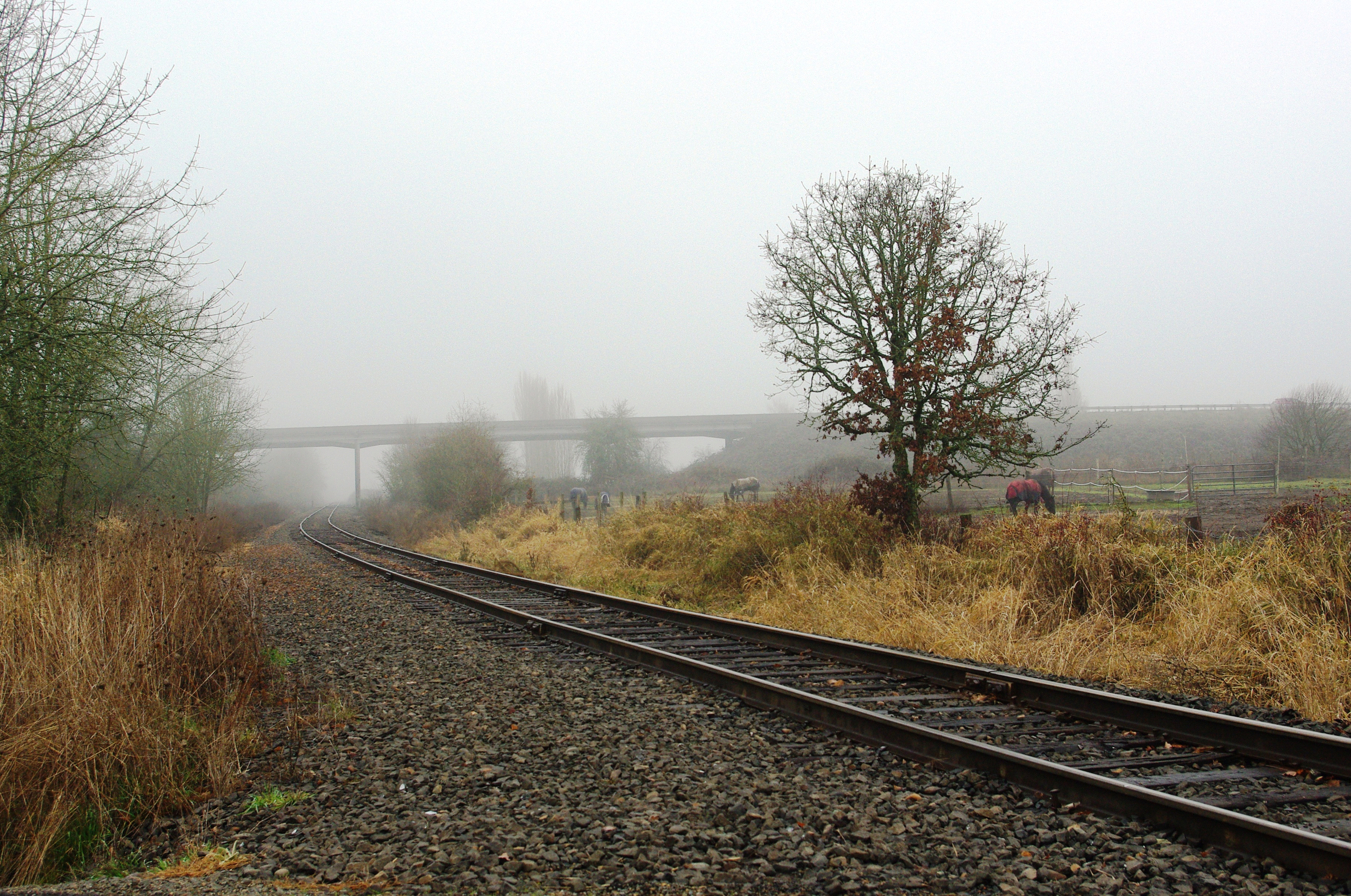
- Railroad crossing of the Port of Tillamook Bay Railroad at Wilkesboro Road with Oregon 6 in the distance

- Location within the state of Oregon Wilkesboro, Oregon (the United States)
- Coordinates: 45°36′31″N 123°05′45″W
- Country: United States
- State: Oregon
- County: Washington
- Elevation: 210 ft (64 m)
- Time zone: UTC-8 (Pacific (PST))
  - Summer (DST): UTC-7 (PDT)
- Area codes: 503 and 971
- GNIS feature ID: 1637939

Wilkesboro is an unincorporated community in Washington County, Oregon, United States. It is located on Oregon Route 6, one mile east of Banks.

Wilkesboro was settled in 1845 by its namesake Peyton G. Wilkes, and platted in 1912. The locale was named about the time United Railways built its interurban line through the area. The post office was established in 1916. In 1915 the town had a population of 50, two churches, a fraternal lodge, a farmer's alliance and a railroad depot. Later there was also a grocery, meat market, blacksmith shop and brickyard, but by 1990 none of these businesses remained. The post office was closed in 1932.

The terminus of the United Railways line was in Wilkesboro, and Gales Creek and Wilson River Railroad (GC&WR) started from this line and ran 12.75 miles to Glenwood. The GC&WR also connected with the Tillamook Branch of the Southern Pacific line in Wilkesboro—that line is now operated by the Portland and Western Railroad via a lease agreement with the Port of Tillamook Bay Railroad. When Oregon Route 6 was extended from Glenwood in 1957, portions of it used the then-abandoned GC&WR grade. The United Railways track was eventually extended to Vernonia but is now abandoned.
