= Mitchell Point (Oregon) =

Mountain in Hood River County, Oregon, U.S.

- Little Storm King
- Location within Oregon

Highest point
- Elevation: 623 ft (190 m)
- Coordinates: 45°42′02″N 121°36′52″W

Geography
- Location: Columbia River Gorge National Scenic Area; Seneca Fouts Memorial State Natural Area; Hood River County, Oregon, U.S.
- Parent range: Cascades
- Topo map: USGS Hood River

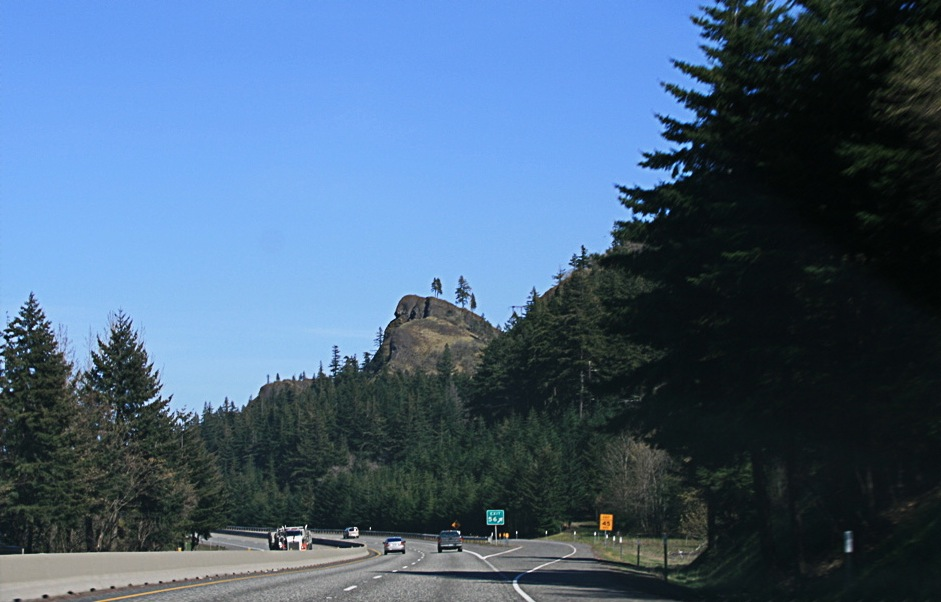
Mitchell Point as seen from I-84

Mitchell Point is a cape in the Columbia River Gorge in Hood River County, Oregon, United States.

Little is known about the man named Mitchell for whom the point was named. He was believed to be a trapper who lived and died in the area. There have been some efforts to rename the point Storm Crest, but they have not been successful.

The now-demolished Mitchell Point Tunnel on the Historic Columbia River Highway was bored through the point, which is a cliff that overhangs the Columbia River. The part of the rock through which the tunnel passed was known to the local Native Americans as Little Storm King, and the larger mountain above that point was known as Great Storm King.
