= The Famous Tay Whale =

Poem by William Topaz McGonagall

- by William Topaz McGonagall
- Country: Scotland
- Language: English
- Subject: Tay Whale
- Publication date: 1884

"The Famous Tay Whale" is a poem by William Topaz McGonagall about the Tay Whale, also known as the Monster, a humpback whale hunted and killed in 1883 in the Firth of Tay near Dundee, Scotland, then the country's main whaling port. The doggerel verse is famous for lacking poetic quality.

== Context ==
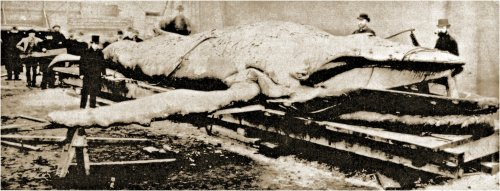
The dissection of the Tay Whale by John Struthers, wearing a top hat, to the left of the photograph

The Tay Whale came to public prominence when it was subject to a public dissection by the anatomist Sir John Struthers and taken on a tour of Scotland and England by a showman, John Woods. Its skeleton is now held by the McManus Galleries in Dundee city centre.

== The poem ==
The 56-line poem is broken into 14 four-line stanzas with irregular rhyming schemes, however the majority of the stanzas follow the AABB or AAAA scheme. No consistent scheme or pattern is used throughout the poem. The poem narrates the story of the whale's arrival ("’Twas in the month of December, and in the year 1883, That a monster whale came to Dundee,"), hunt ("And they laughed and grinned just like wild baboons, While they fired at him their sharp harpoons"), and eventual demise, capture, and exhibition.

== Critical reception ==
Paul Godfrey described McGonagall on the strength of the Tay Whale and other verse as "the worst poet in the English language".

The poet and essayist Hugh MacDiarmid wrote of the Tay Whale that "what this [the verses about John Wood and the Tay Whale] amounts to, of course, is simply what quite uneducated and stupid people—the two adjectives by no means necessarily go together, for many uneducated people have great vitality and a raciness of utterance altogether lacking here—would produce if asked to recount something they had read in a newspaper." MacDiarmid continued that "in their retailings of, or comments upon, such matters, hoi polloi would also reflect their personal feelings, as is done here, by the tritest of emotional exclamations."

== Musical settings ==
McGonagall's poem was set to music by the composer Mátyás Seiber in 1958. The premiere performance of this work – scored for orchestra, foghorn, espresso coffee machine and narrator – took place at the second of the humorous composer Gerard Hoffnung's music festivals, with Edith Evans in the role of the narrator. In 2013, the poem was scored for two SATB choirs by Finnish composer Jaakko Mäntyjärvi in a commission for the Yale Glee Club and Princeton Glee Club's centennial pre-football game concert.
