= Mátyás Seiber =

Hungarian-born British composer

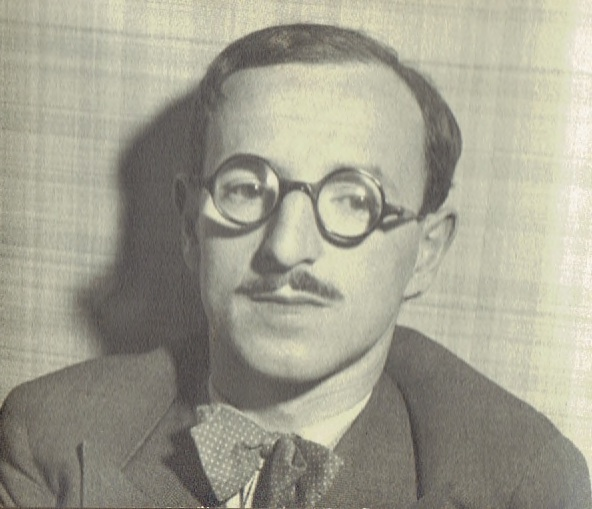
- Seiber, c. 1935
- Born: 4 May 1905; Budapest, Hungary
- Died: 24 September 1960 (aged 55); Kruger National Park, South Africa
- Citizenship: Hungary; United Kingdom
- Occupation: Composer

Mátyás György Seiber (Hungarian: [ˈmaːcaːʃ ˈʃaibɛr], sometimes given as Matthis Seyber; 4 May 1905 – 24 September 1960) was a Hungarian-born British composer who lived and worked in the United Kingdom from 1935 onwards. His work linked many diverse musical influences, from the Hungarian tradition of Bartók and Kodály, to Schoenberg and serial music, to jazz, folk song, and lighter music.

== Early life ==
Seiber was born in Budapest. His mother, Berta Patay, was a well known pianist and teacher, so the young Seiber gained considerable skill with that instrument first. At the age of ten, he began to learn to play the cello. After attending grammar school, where he was regarded as "outstanding" in mathematics and Latin according to the almanacs of the Franz Liszt Academy of Music, he studied the cello and composition from 1918 to 1925, and composition with Zoltán Kodály from 1921 to 1925. For his degree, he wrote his String Quartet No. 1 (in A minor). Pieces composed at this time, such as the Serenade for Six Wind Instruments of 1925, show him combining traditional Hungarian folk tunes with the forms of Western art music. Seiber submitted his Serenade to a composition contest in Budapest shortly after its completion. When the piece did not win despite jury member Béla Bartók's insistence on its superiority to the other submissions, Bartók left the jury in protest. Seiber toured Hungary with Zoltán Kodály, collecting folk songs, and built on the research of Kodály and Bartók. He also developed an interest in medieval plainchant.

== Career ==
In 1925, Seiber accepted a teaching position at a private music school. In 1926, he took a position to play the cello in the orchestra of a ship travelling between North and South America. This was where he became acquainted with jazz.

In 1928 he became director of the jazz department at the Hoch Conservatory in Frankfurt, which offered the first academic jazz courses anywhere. His text book Schule für Jazz-Schlagzeug was written in 1929, as a practical summary of his theoretical requirements. Two of his articles of great importance were published in the journal Melos: "Jazz als Erziehungsmittel" (1928) and "Jazz-Instrumente, Jazz-Klang und Neue Musik" (1930). After the jazz department was closed by the Nazis in April, 1933, Seiber left Germany. He returned to Hungary but did not settle there.

Seiber emigrated to England in 1935 and settled in London. He only became a British citizen after the war. Seiber taught composition and cello privately while working as a consultant for the subsidiary of Schott Music in London and composed film music. Michael Tippett invited him to be a professor of composition at Morley College in London, and from 1942 he was on the staff there; he became a teacher of composition, music aesthetics, and music theory. His many students included Don Banks, John Exton, Peter Racine Fricker, Alan Gibbs, Anthony Gilbert, Stanley Glasser, Michael Graubart, Barry Gray, Karel Janovický, Ingvar Lidholm, Malcolm Lipkin, David Lumsdaine, John McCarthy, John Mayer, Anthony Milner, Peter Schat, Wally Stott (who later became Angela Morley) and Hugh Wood. During this period, he created and trained his choir, the Dorian Singers.

His friendships and work associations embraced many soloists, including Tibor Varga, Dennis Brain, Norbert Brainin, guitarists Julian Bream and John Williams, percussionist Jimmy Blades, folk singer Bert Lloyd, Max Rostal and tenor Peter Pears.

He was a founder member of the Society for the Promotion of New Music, actively promoting new music throughout his life.

== Personal life ==
In 1946 Seiber married the modern dancer Lilla Bauer (1912–2011), another Hungarian émigré. She was a lecturer at Goldsmiths’ College in London. They moved out of London to Caterham Surrey, in 1949. Julia Seiber Boyd is their daughter.

In 1960, while on a lecture tour in South Africa, Seiber was in a car accident in Kruger National Park and died of his injuries. Kodály, his former teacher, dedicated a choral work Media vita in morte sumus to his memory.

== Music ==
Seiber's music is eclectic in style, showing the influences of Bartók, Kodály, Schoenberg, serialism, jazz, and Hungarian folk song, and his output includes film and lighter music. Often, individual pieces use a combination of these influences. For instance, the two Jazzolettes for wind and percussion (1929 and 1932, composed in Frankfurt) make liberal use of jazz effects and rhythms that displace the bar lines, but also show his first explorations of twelve-note techniques. His wartime, Fantasia concertante for violin and orchestra, premiered in 1945 and recorded by Andre Gertler, and the later work Permutationi a Cinque (1948) for wind ensemble, illustrate Seiber's very free use of serialism. Permutationi a Cinque explicitly uses permutations of motifs that eventually come together to reveal a twelve-tone series - but it is all done with lightness and humour.

Seiber's vocal output includes the large scale cantata Ulysses (1947) on words by James Joyce, another Joyce-related work, Three Fragments from "A Portrait of the Artist as a Young Man", and choral arrangements of Hungarian and Yugoslav folk songs. He also wrote one opera, Eva spielt mit Puppen (1934), and the ballet The Invitation. Other works include the two orchestral Besardo suites, a clarinet concertino, three string quartets, and scores to animated films produced by Halas & Batchelor, including Animal Farm (1954). The substantial Sonata for violin and piano, a commission for the Cheltenham Festival, was completed just before his death in 1960.

Two comic operas, A Palágyi Pekek and Balaton, were composed for the Hungarian theatre in London, the "Londoni Pódium". A Palágyi Pékek, (libretto, György Mikes) (1943), was the first collaboration of Mátyás Seiber and George Mikes. Balaton, (libretto, György Mikes) (1944), as George Mikes has reported, was aired during the war by the BBC and, after the end of the war even made it to Budapest. A setting of the Scottish "poet and tragedian" William McGonagall's work, The Famous Tay Whale was written for the second of Gerard Hoffnung's music festivals in 1958.

Seiber used a pseudonym for his jazz works and popular music: G. S. Mathis or George Mathis (a rearrangement of his name using Anglicised forms). In 1957 he was awarded the Ivor Novello Award for Best Song Musically and Lyrically for "By the Fountains of Rome," which was a hit that year in the UK Single Charts, making it to the Top Twenty. (The lyrics were by Norman Newell, and it was sung by David Hughes).

== Compositions (selected) ==
Seiber's compositions at Schott Music and the British Library.

=== Orchestral ===
- Sinfonietta for string orchestra (1925/1964) (from String Quartet No. 1, transcribed for string orchestra by Antal Doráti; Schott)
- Besardo-Suite No. 1 (1940)
- Besardo-Suite No. 2 for strings (1942; 14 mins.; Schott; BL)
- Fantasia concertante for violin and string orchestra (1943; 17 mins.; Ars Viva Verlag, Mainz; Schott; BL)
- Notturno for horn and string orchestra (1944) (8.5 mins.; Schott; BL)
- Concertino for clarinet and string orchestra (1951; 15 mins.; Schott)
- Elegy for viola and small orchestra (1954; 8 mins.; Schott)
- Tre Pezzi for cello and orchestra (1957; 20 mins.; Schott; BL)
- Improvisations for jazzband and orchestra (with John Dankworth) (1959; 10 min.; Schott; BL)
- Renaissance Dance Suite (1959)

=== Instrumental and chamber music ===
- Divertimento for clarinet and string Quartet (1925; Schott)
- Serenade for six wind instruments (1925; Wilhelm Hansen, Copenhagen; BL)
- String Quartet No. 1 (1925; 18 mins.; BL)
- Two Jazzolettes for 2 saxophones, trumpet, trombone, piano, bass, and drums (1929 and 1932; Wilhelm Hansen, Copenhagen; BL)
- String Quartet No. 2 (1935; 22 mins.; BL)
- Sonata da Camera (ca. 1948, 15 mins.)
- String Quartet No. 3, Quartetto lirico (1951; 23 mins.; Schott; BL)
- Concert Piece for violin and piano (1954; 8 mins.; Schott; BL)
- Fantasia per flauto, corno e quartetto d'archi (1956; Edizioni Suvini Zerboni, Milano)
- Permutazioni a Cinque for wind quintet (1958; 6.5 mins.; Schott; BL)
- Sonata for violin and piano (1960; 20 mins.; Schott; BL)
- Introduction and Allegro, originally cello and accordion, arranged for clarinet, cello and piano (Schott)

=== Vocal works with orchestra ===
- Ulysses, cantata for tenor, mixed chorus and orchestra (1947; 45 mins.; Schott; BL)
- Cantata Secularis: the Four Seasons for mixed choir and orchestra (text from Carmina Burana) (1949-1952; 20 mins.; Schott; BL)
- Three Fragments from "A Portrait of the Artist as a Young Man" by James Joyce: chamber cantata for speaker, mixed choir and instrumental ensemble (18 mins.; Schott; BL)

=== A cappella choral music ===
- Missa Brevis (1924, revised 1950; 14 mins.; Curwen; BL)
- Three Nonsense Songs (lyrics by Edward Lear; 1956)

=== Songs for solo voice/choral and accompaniment ===
- Three Morgenstern Songs (1929) for voice and clarinet
- To Poetry for voice and piano (1952; 18 mins.; BL)
- The Famous Tay Whale (text by William McGonagall)(BL)
- Four Greek Folk Songs for high voice and string orchestra or string quartet (11 mins.; Schott)
- Four French Folk Songs for high voice and guitar (7 mins.; Schott)
- Four medieval french songs for voice, viola d’amore (or viola), viola da gamba (or violoncello) and guitar (Schott)
- Petőfi Songs (4 Hungarian Folk Songs) (12 mins.)
- Yugoslav Folk-Songs mixed choir (SATB) a cappella (Boosey & Hawkes / Schott)
- Three Hungarian Folk Songs
- The Owl and the Pussy-Cat (1957) for voice and piano (Schott)

=== Stage/ballet ===
- Eva spielt mit Puppen (1934)
- The Invitation for orchestra (1960; Schott, BL)

=== Arrangements ===
Seiber's compositions and arrangements under the name G. S. Mathis and G. B. Mathis.

- Autumn Melody - Rapley, Felton. Arranged by G. S. Mathis (1938; BL)
- Countryside Caprice - Smith, Eric Arthur. Arranged by G. S. Mathis (1938; BL)
- Dance of the Midgets - Smith, Eric Arthur. Arranged by G. S. Mathis (1939; BL)
- Easy Dances - A collection of new Dance Rhythms Arranged for Piano Accordion by G. S. Mathis (1937; BL)
- Haydn's Gipsy Rondo - Haydn, Joseph. Arranged for Accordion by G. S. Mathis (BL)
- Minuet in D - Mozart, Wolfgang Amadeus. Arranged for Piano Accordion by G. S. Mathis (BL)
- Nocturne in E flat - Chopin, Frédéric. Arranged for Piano Accordion by G. B. Mathis (BL)
- Selection - Leoncavallo, Ruggiero. Arranged (for Piano-Accordion Orchestra) by G. S. Mathis (BL)
- The Barber of Seville - Rossini, Gioacchino. Overture Arranged (for Accordion Band) in simplified form by G. S. Mathis in 3 parts, with optional Bass and Drum Parts (BL)
- Turkish March - Mozart, Wolfgang Amadeus. Arranged for Piano Accordion by G. S. Mathis (BL)

== Selected filmography ==
- Figurehead (1952, short film)
- The Fake (1953)
- Animal Farm (1954)
- The Diamond (1954)
- A Town Like Alice (1956)
- Robbery Under Arms (1957)
- Chase a Crooked Shadow (1958)
