= Whaling in Scotland =

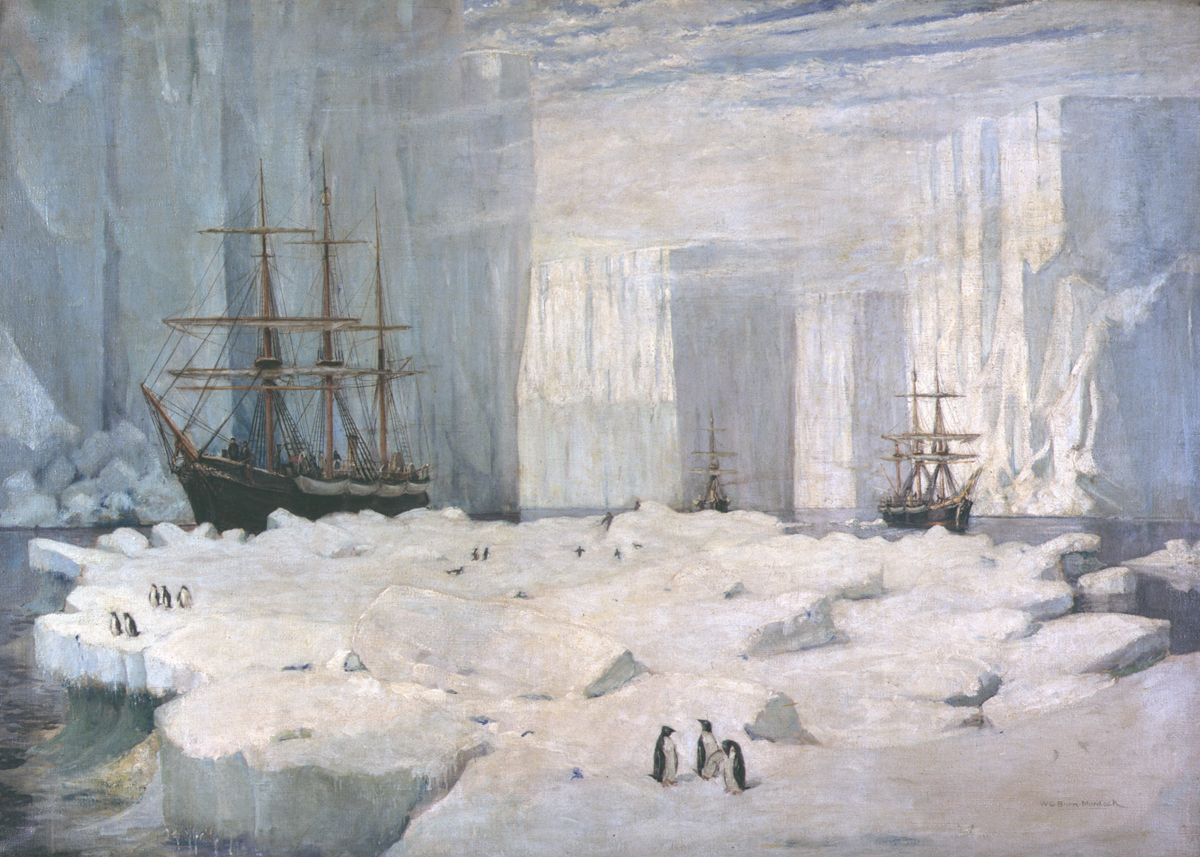
Dundee Antarctic Whaling Expedition, 1892, by William Gordon Burn Murdoch.

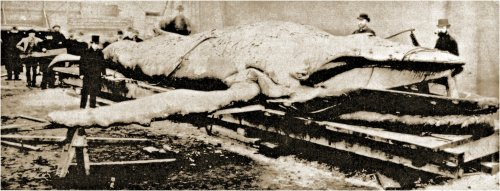
John Struthers (at left, in top hat) with the Tay Whale at John Woods' yard, Dundee, 1884, photographed by George Washington Wilson.

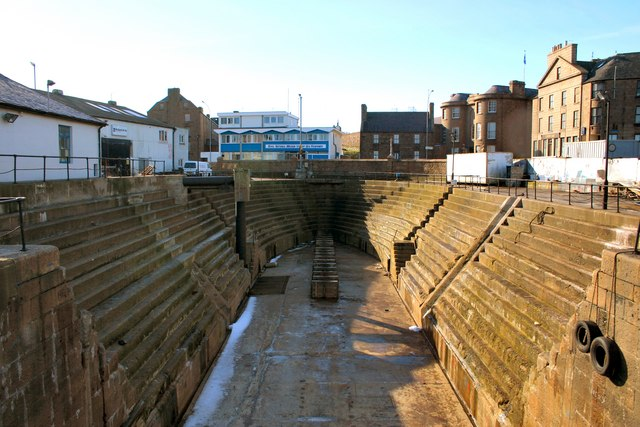
Graving dock, North Harbour at Peterhead. The fine, granite-built, graving dock (dry dock) was built in 1855 to meet the needs of the large Greenland whaling ships. Today it is used for the repair of fishing vessels.

The first evidence for whaling in Scotland is from Bronze Age settlements where whalebones were used for constructing and decorating dwelling places. Commercial whaling started in the Middle Ages, and by the 1750s most Scottish ports were whaling, with the Edinburgh Whale-Fishing Company being founded in 1749. The last company still engaged in whaling was Christian Salvesen, which exited the industry in 1963.

== History ==
In the 19th century Arctic bowhead whaling, conducted from ports right along the east coast of the country, was vital for the Scottish jute industry, especially for processing jute fibre in Dundee. Whale oil was also used for street lighting. The two main Scottish ports were Dundee and Peterhead. Greenock was the only significant whaling port on the west coast.

Whaling was also conducted on the west coast. A station at Bun Abhainn Eadarra near Tarbert in the Outer Hebrides was founded by the Norwegian Karl Herlofsen in 1904. Later acquired by Lever Brothers it was abandoned by them in 1929. Operations continued under new owners but it finally closed in 1951. Little remains to be seen of the site except the incongruous red brick chimney.

The Scottish whaling industry rapidly declined at the beginning of the 20th century, and ended completely in 1963 when Edinburgh-based Christian Salvesen, once the largest whaling company in the world, withdrew from the industry and sold its last two whaling vessels.

Although whaling is now considered to be a controversial trade, for many centuries it was a vital element of the Scottish economy.

== Pioneering role of Scottish whalers in Antarctic exploration ==
The first known photographs of Antarctica were taken during the Scottish whaling expedition of 1892-93. A Dundee whaling fleet, with scientific officers on board, visited the Falkland Islands, the Joinville Island group and the northern Trinity Peninsula. Captain Robertson discovered and charted Active Sound and the Firth of Tay. The fleet encountered Carl Anton Larsen of the Jason, near Joinville Island, on 24 December 1892. Four ships took part:

- Thomas Robertson, Active, with Charles W. Donald
- Alexander Fairweather, Balaena, with William Speirs Bruce and William Gordon Burn Murdoch
- Robert Davidson, Diana
- James Davidson, Polar Star

The success of the 1892-93 expedition led directly to the Scottish National Antarctic Expedition of 1902–04, and to Dundee being chosen for building the Discovery for the Discovery Expedition of 1901–04.

== Scottish place names in Antarctica ==
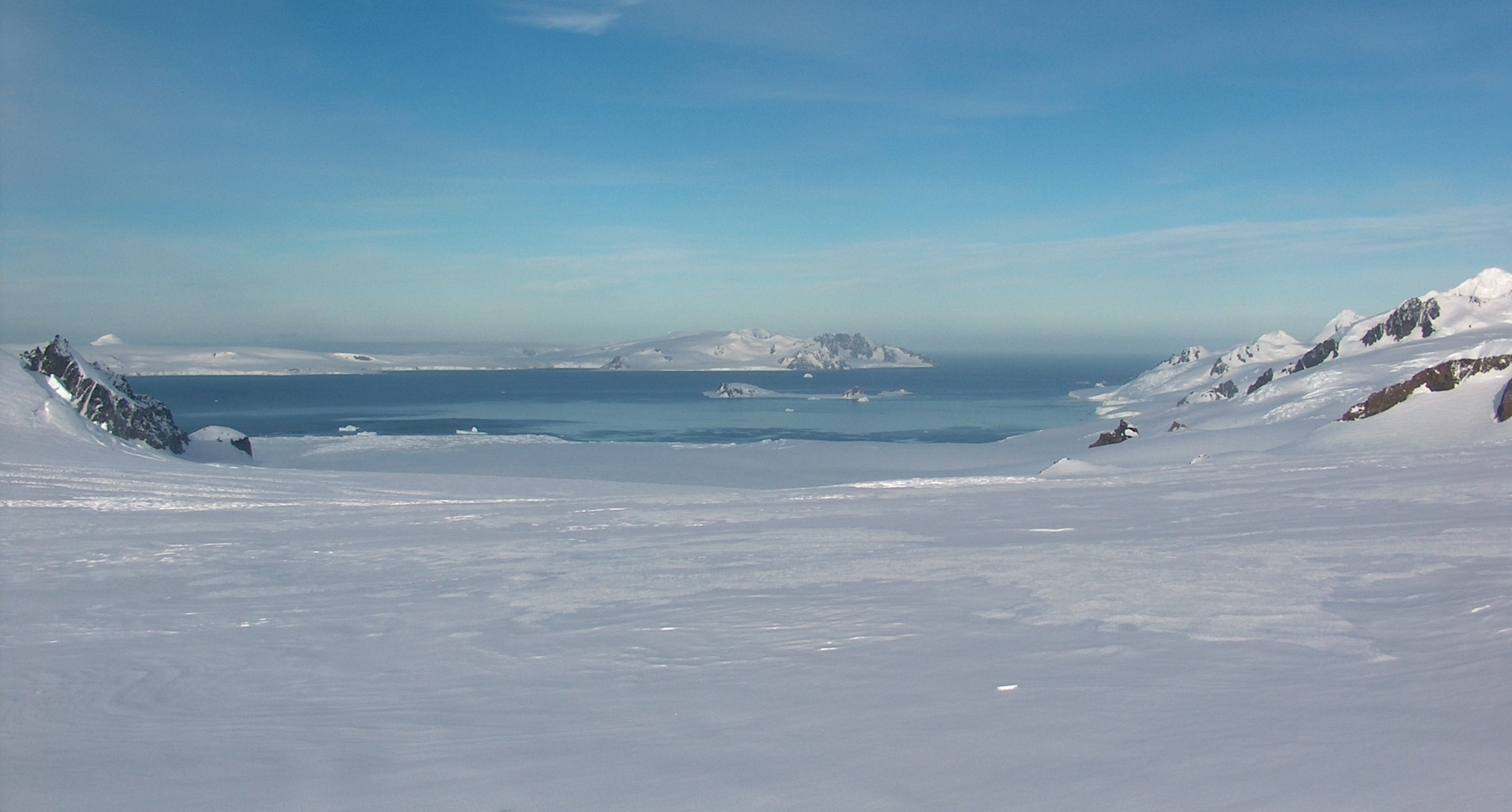
Huron Glacier and McFarlane Strait on Livingston Island, South Shetlands

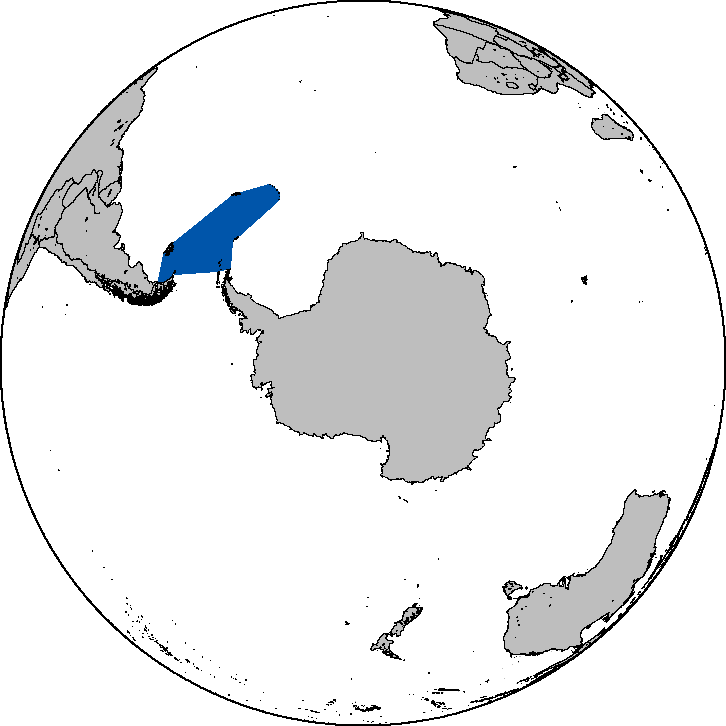
Scotia Sea

Map of the Falkland Islands

Due to the work of Scottish whalers, sealers and other sailors, several place names in or near Antarctica have Scottish origins:

- Anderson Peninsula
- Coats Land, named for the brothers James and Andrew Coats of J and P Coats, Glasgow, who funded the Scottish National Antarctic Expedition
- Dundee Island and Firth of Tay
- Inverleith Harbour
- McDonald Ice Rumples
- McMurdo Sound, McMurdo Ice Shelf & McMurdo Station
- McIntyre Island
- MacKenzie Bay
- Mount Campbell
- Mount Crawford (Antarctica)
- Mount Dalrymple
- Mount Douglas (Antarctica)
- Mount Hamilton (Antarctica)
- Mount Inverleith
- Mount Kirkpatrick/Kilpatrick & Kirkpatrick Basalt (named for a Glasgow businessman)
- Mount Strathcona
- Robertson Island
- Robertson Islands
- Scotia Arc & Scotia Sea
- Trinity Peninsula, etymology unknown, but may be named after Trinity House in Leith, Scotland's centre for maritime administration
- Weddell Sea, named in 1822 after the Scottish sealer James Weddell
- Falkland Islands, from Falkland Sound, named for Anthony Cary, 5th Viscount of Falkland, who in turn took his title from Falkland Palace in Fife. See also West Falkland & East Falkland, the two main islands.
  - Douglas
  - Brenton Loch (inlet) and Loch Head Pond are rare examples of the Scottish word 'loch' being applied to bodies of water outwith Scotland
- South Orkneys
  - Ailsa Craig
  - Cape Geddes
  - Laurie Island (named by Scottish National Antarctic Expedition)
  - Nigg Rock
  - Orcadas Base
  - Omond House
  - Scotia Bay
- South Shetlands
  - Barclay Bay
  - Duff Point
  - Gibbs Island
  - Livingston Island, McFarlane Strait (Livingston)
  - McFarlane Strait
  - Morton Strait
  - South Shetland Trough

== See also ==
- Fishing in Scotland
- Murray's Bay, Robben Island, South Africa; in 1806 the Scottish whaler John Murray opened a whaling station at a sheltered bay on the north-eastern shore of the island which became known as Murray's Bay, adjacent to the site of the present-day harbour named Murray's Bay Harbour which was constructed in 1939–40 (see Scottish placenames in South Africa).
- Olna Firth, Shetland
- Tay Whale
  - The Famous Tay Whale, a poem by William Topaz McGonagall
- John Sen Inches Thomson
- Whaling in the United Kingdom
