= Tay Whale =

Whale caught in Scotland and exhibited in Britain

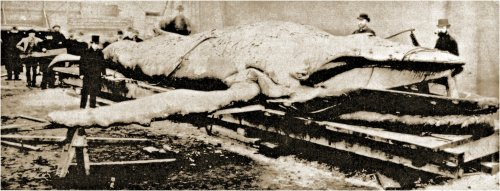
The anatomist John Struthers (at left, in top hat) with the Tay Whale at John Woods's yard, Dundee, 1884, photographed by George Washington Wilson

The Tay Whale, known locally as the Monster, was a humpback whale that swam into the Firth of Tay of eastern Scotland in 1883. It was harpooned in a hunt, but escaped, and was found floating dead off Stonehaven a week later. It was towed into Dundee by a showman, John Woods, and exhibited on a train tour of Scotland and England.

The Regius Professor of Anatomy at Aberdeen University, John Struthers dissected the whale, much of the time in public with a military band playing in the background, organised by Woods. The decomposing whale made Woods a great deal of money, and Struthers famous.

The doggerel poet William McGonagall wrote a notoriously bad poem, "The Famous Tay Whale", shortly after the events.

== History ==
Location map for the Tay Whale, showing Dundee (D, 12 November – 31 December), Montrose (M, 31 December), the Firth of Forth (F, 1 January), and Stonehaven (S, 8 January)

In December 1883, a humpback whale appeared in the Firth of Tay off the shore of Dundee, at that time Scotland's major whaling port, and attracted much local interest. The whalers normally hunted in the Arctic, but as the whaling boats were in harbour for the winter, some of the whalers decided to hunt this animal in their own waters.

After several failed attempts, they harpooned the humpback on 31 December 1883. It was a strong male, and it towed two rowing boats and two steamboats as far as Montrose and then to the Firth of Forth. After a struggle that lasted all night, the harpoon lines broke and the whale escaped.

A week later the whale was found dead, floating out at sea. It was towed to Stonehaven and dragged onto the beach. John Struthers, the Regius professor of Anatomy at Aberdeen, quickly visited the carcass, recording it as 40 feet long with flukes measuring 11 feet 4 inches. A local entrepreneur, John Woods, bought the whale and had it transported to his yard in Dundee. On the first Sunday that it was there, 12,000 people paid to see it.

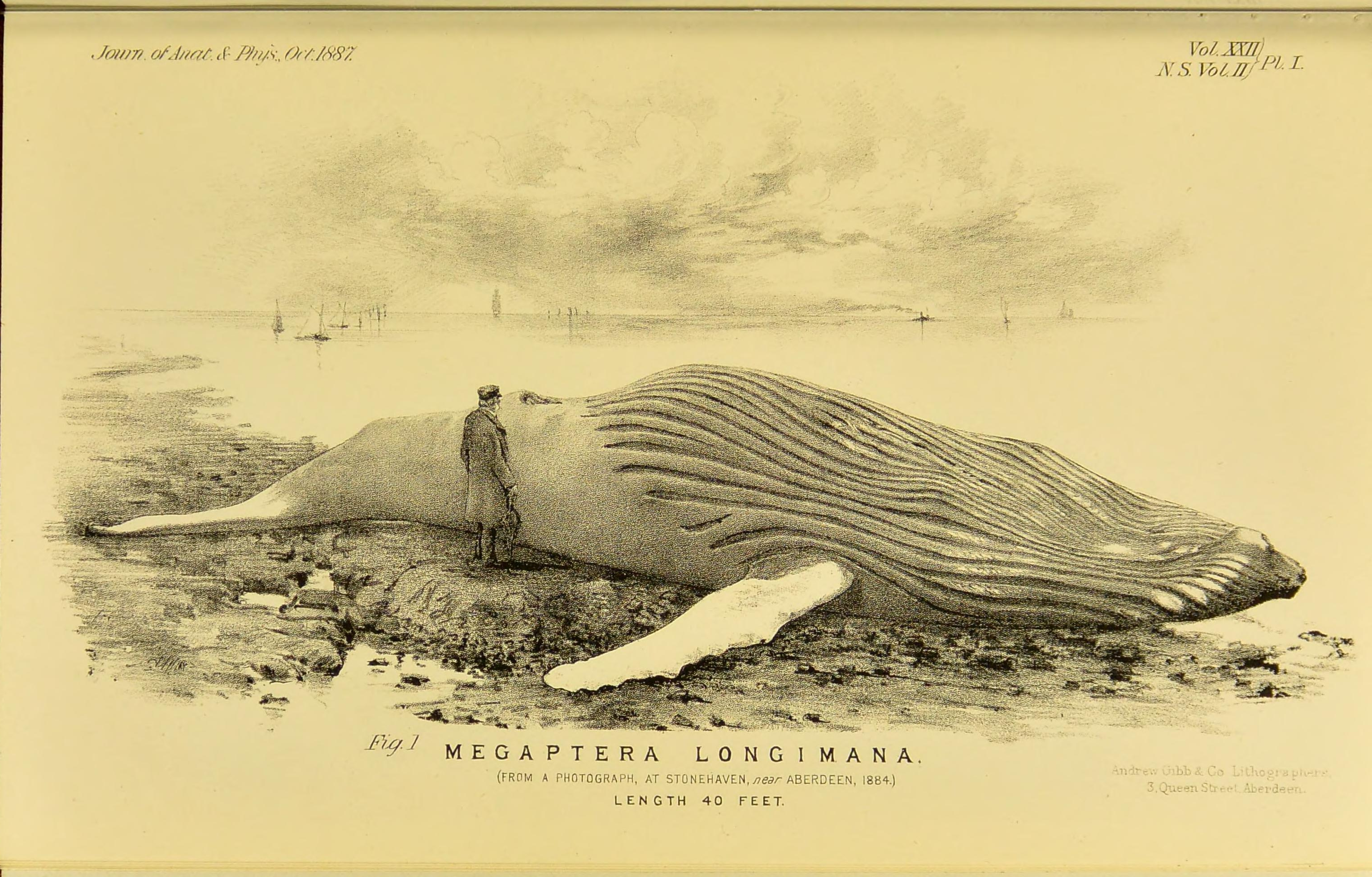
A contemporary engraving of the Tay Whale on the beach at Stonehaven in 1884

The local newspaper, the Dundee Courier, published at least 21 stories on the Tay Whale between 12 November 1883 and 11 January 1884. The headlines included:

- Appearance of a Whale in the River – 12 November
- Whale Hunting in the Tay – 16 November
- Return of the Whale to the Tay – 21 November
- On the Trail of the Whale – 7 December
- Christmas Greeting from the Whale – 25 December
- The Whale Interviewed by his Mother on his Exploits in the River Tay (poem) – 27 December
- The Whale Hunt in the Tay. Exciting Chase – 1 January
- The Whale Hunt in the Tay. Escape of the Whale – 2 January
- The Runaway Whale – 4 January
- The Tay Whale Found Dead – 8 January
- The Whale's Corpus – 9 January
- The Recovered Whale at Stonehaven. Sale of the Monster to a Dundee Man – 11 January

Finally on 25 January 1884, when the whale was too badly decomposed for further public exhibition, Struthers was allowed to come and dissect the famous specimen. He was well used to working on stinking carcasses: his dissecting room was reputed to stink "like the deck of a Greenland whaler". He had two assistants; but the dissection was disturbed by John Woods, who admitted the public, for a fee, to watch the dissection in progress, while a military band played in the background.

There were snow showers, but Struthers was able to remove much of the skeleton before Woods had the flesh embalmed; the carcass was then stuffed and sewn up to be taken on a profitable tour as far as Edinburgh and London. Finally on 7 August 1884 Struthers was able to remove the skull and the rest of the skeleton. Struthers eventually wrote seven anatomy articles over the next decade on the whale, and ultimately published a complete monograph on it in 1889, entitled Memoir on the Anatomy of the Humpback Whale, Megaptera Longimana.

In 2011, the whale's skeleton was displayed in the McManus Galleries in Dundee.

== Fame for anatomist ==
Struthers became famous for his dissection of the Tay Whale, his largest specimen. It was one of a wide range of specimens of many species that he energetically collected to form a museum of zoology, to illustrate Darwin's theories.

== Fame in doggerel ==
The whale became so famous that the doggerel poet William Topaz McGonagall (1825–1902) wrote a notably bad poem, (Note: Paul Corfield Godfrey called McGonagall "[T]he worst poet in the English language...") (Note: Hugh MacDiarmid wrote: "What this [the verses about John Wood and the Tay Whale] amounts to, of course, is simply what quite uneducated and stupid people—the two adjectives by no means necessarily go together, for many uneducated people have great vitality and a raciness of utterance altogether lacking here—would produce if asked to recount something they had read in a newspaper. ... In their retailings of, or comments upon, such matters, the hoi polloi would also reflect their personal feelings, as is done here, by the tritest of emotional exclamations.") "The Famous Tay Whale", about it. Two of the verses run:

And my opinion is that God sent the whale in time of need,
No matter what other people may think or what is their creed;
I know fishermen in general are often very poor
And God in His goodness sent it to drive poverty from their door.

So Mr. John Wood has bought it for two hundred and twenty-six pound,
And has brought it to Dundee all safe and all sound;
Which measures forty feet in length from the snout to the tail,
So I advise the people far and near to see it without fail.

This was not the only piece of doggerel verse about the whale, as a poet signing himself "Spectator" published "The Whale Interviewed by his Mother on his Exploits in the River Tay" in the Dundee Courier, with verses such as:

Oh! why went you there, my son, my son,
Within the range of their banging gun?
"Fear not, mother, 'twas only a lark,
I reckoned they would shoot wide of the mark."

== Anatomical drawings of the Tay Whale by John Struthers ==
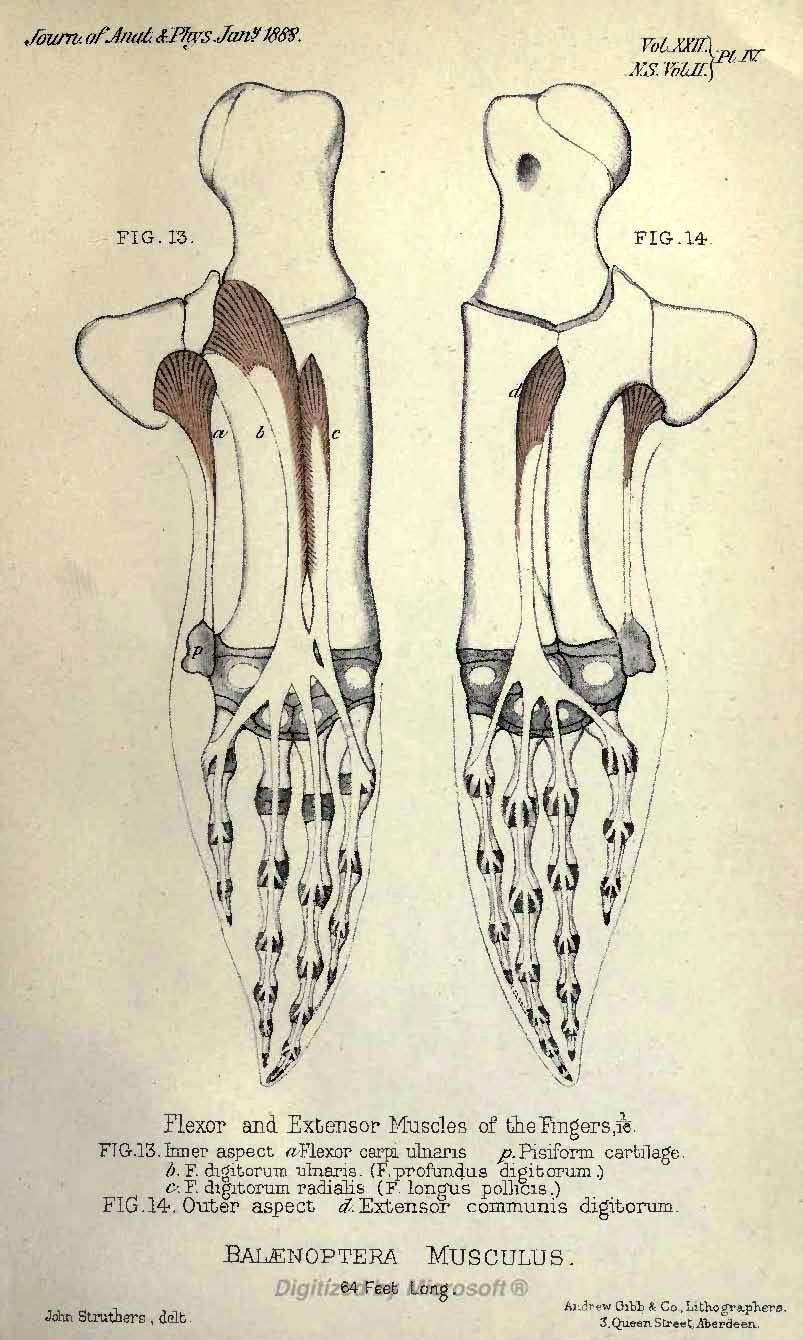

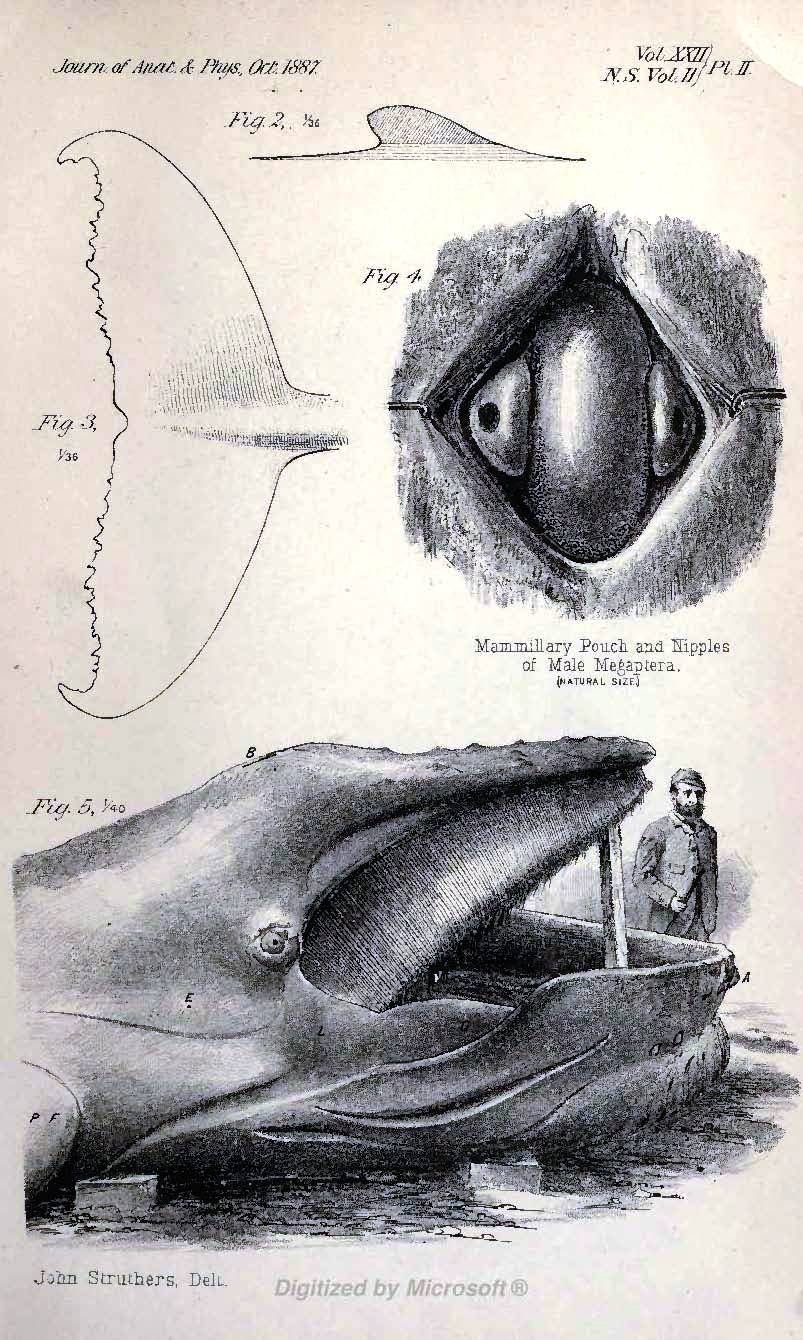

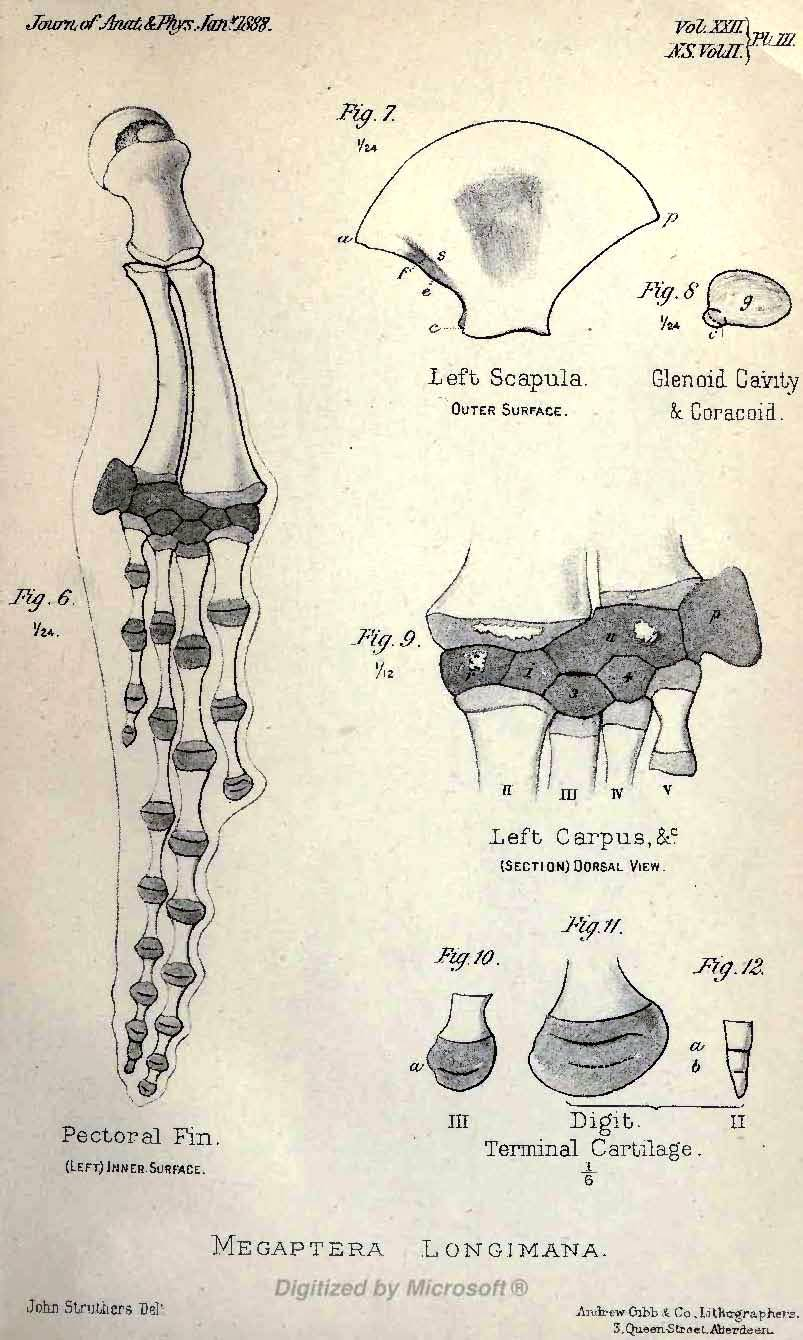

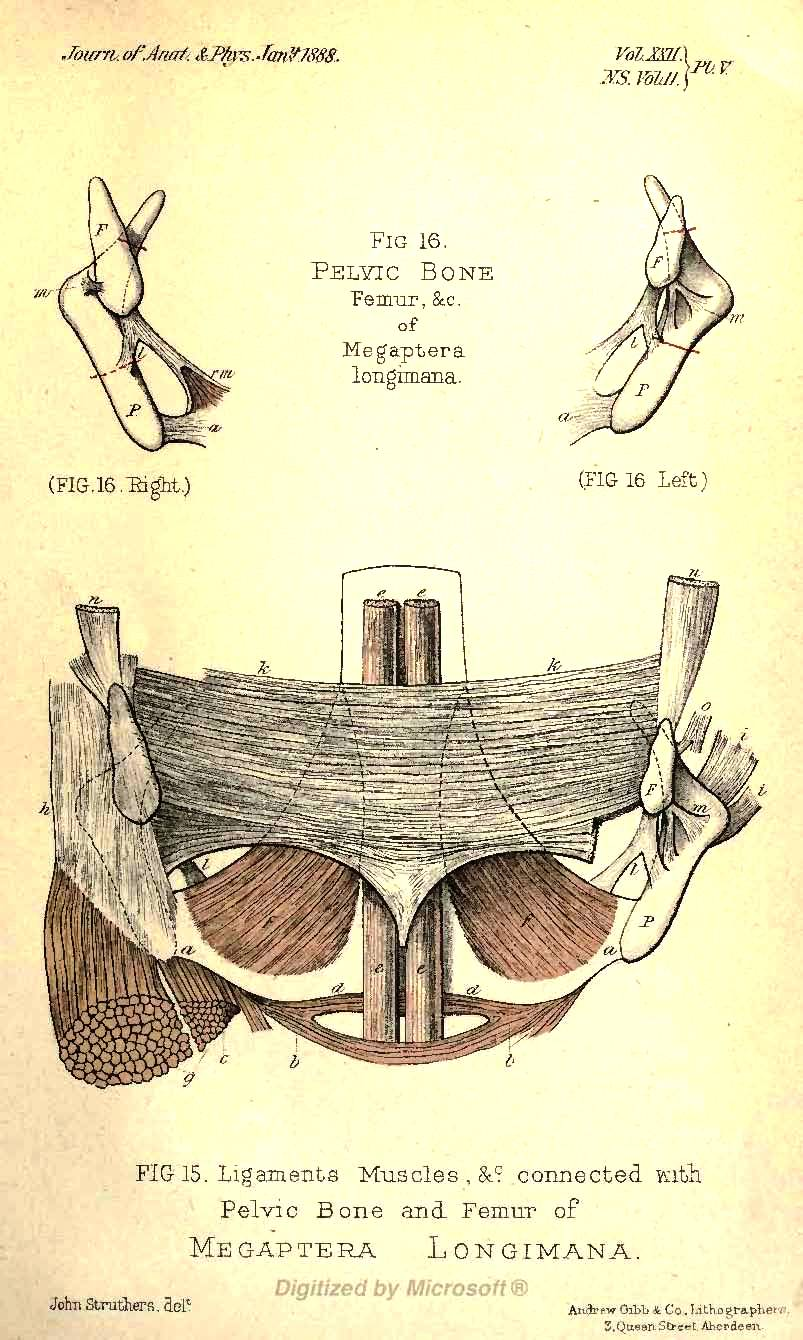

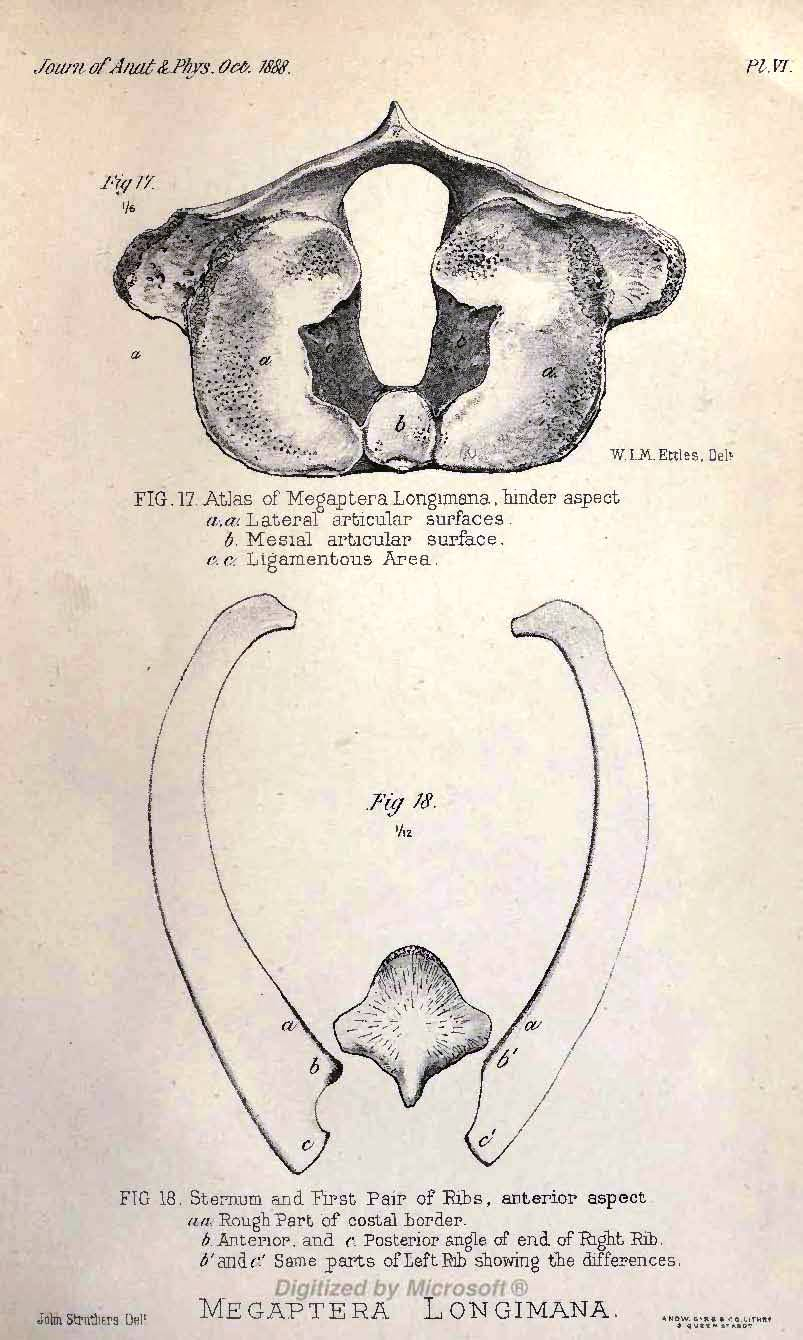

== Sculpture ==
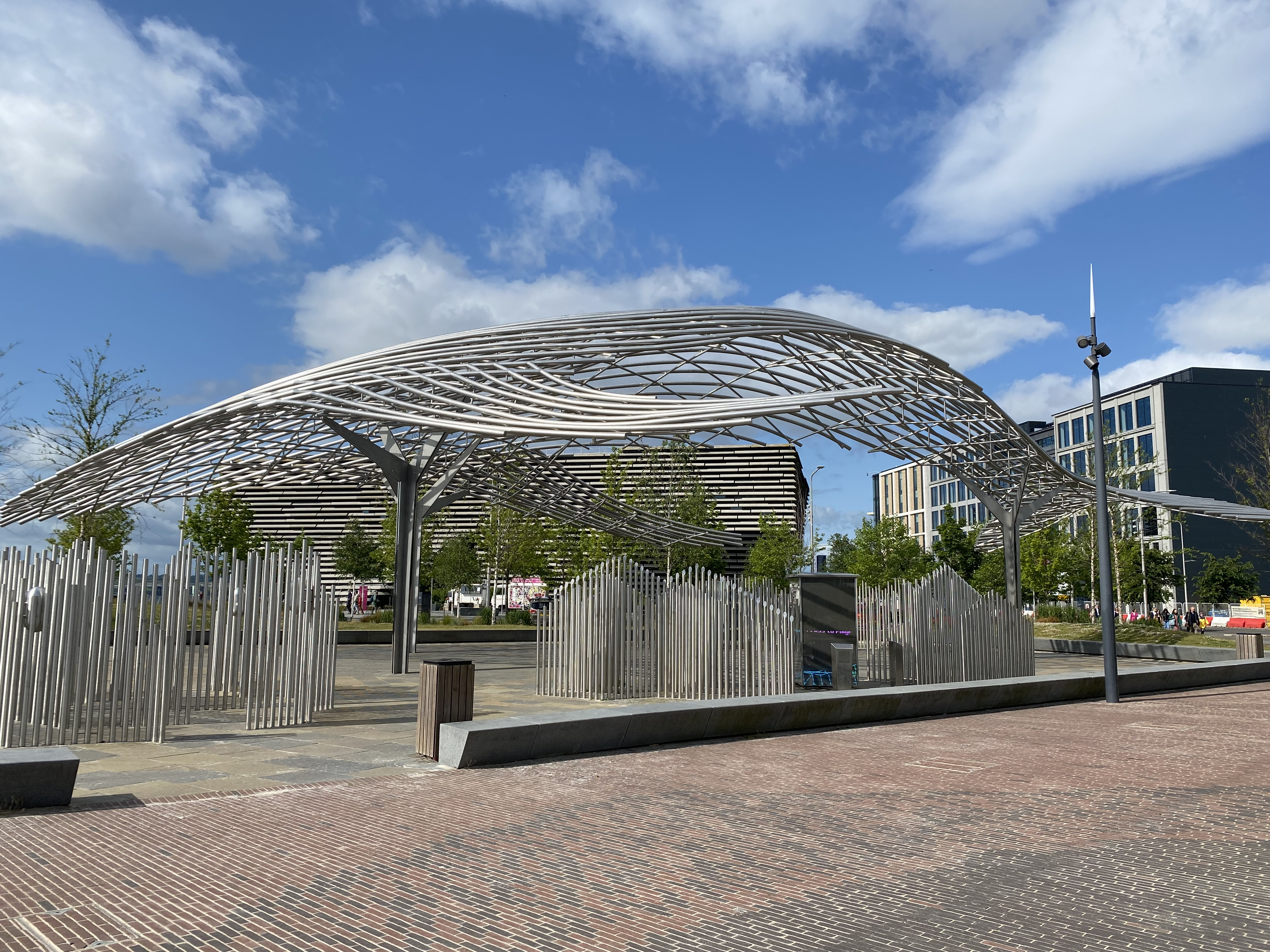
The Tay Whale sculpture by Lee Simmons

A 22-tonne tubular stainless steel sculpture of the whale, by Lee Simmons, was installed at Waterfront Place, Dundee, in October 2021.

== See also ==
- List of individual cetaceans
