= John Sen Inches Thomson =

Scottish whaler

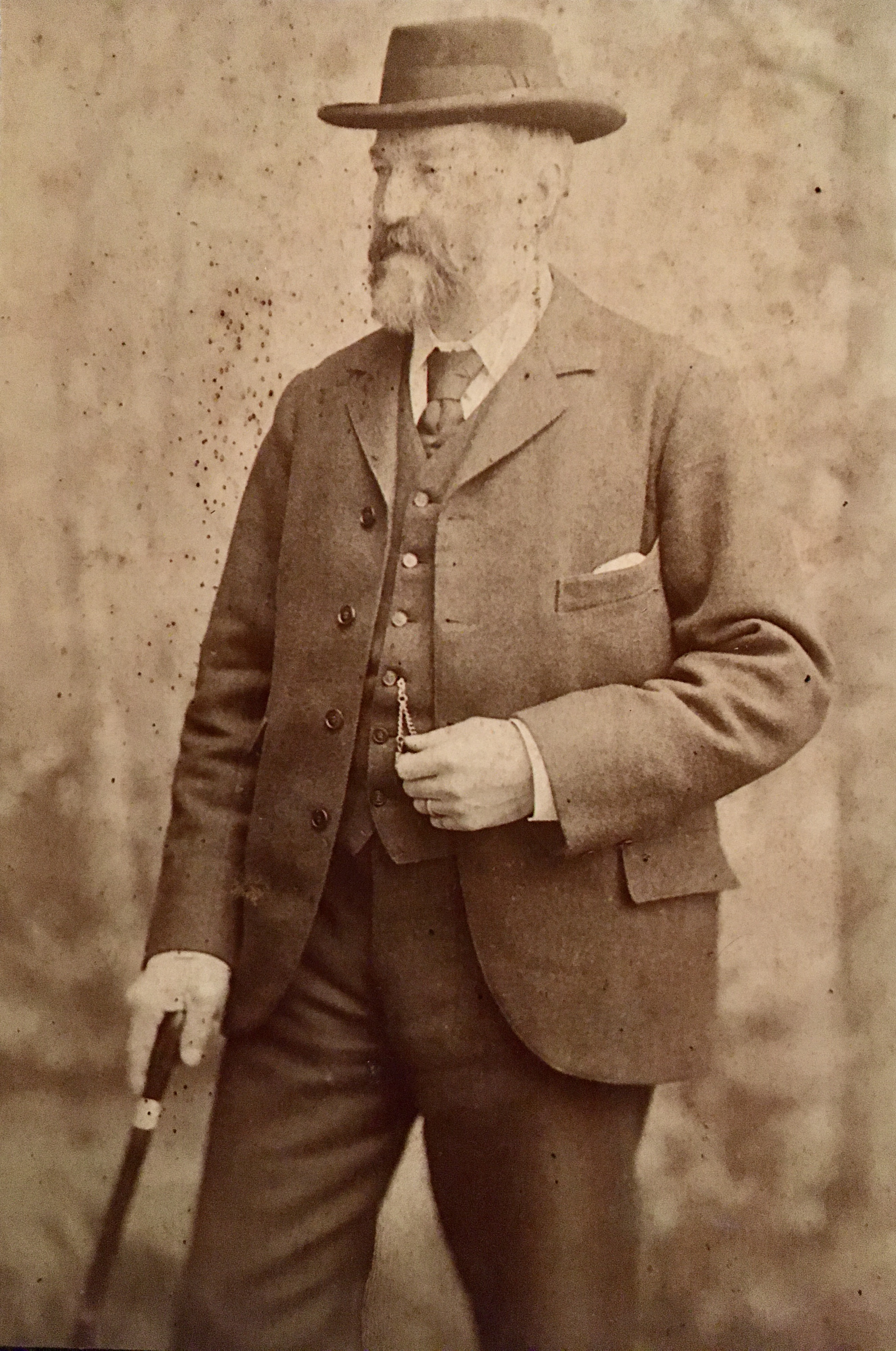

John Sen Inches Thomson (1844–1933), was a Scottish whaler and sealer, ship owner, captain, inventor and author. In 1877, Inches Thomson and his crew were sailing on Bencleugh when she shipwrecked during a terrific gale off Macquarie Island, Tasmania, Australia. After four months on the island the crew was rescued by Bencleugh's sister ship, Friendship. In 1912, Inches Thomson released a book detailing the highlights of his sea voyages, including his time as a castaway.

== Shipwreck ==
John Sen Inches Thomson and his brother, Andrew operated under "Thomson Brothers" as ship chandlers and managed sealing and whaling ships in the waters surrounding Australia and New Zealand. They were part owners of the sailing ships Parisian, Superb and Othello and fully owned the Redcliffe, Bencleugh, Friendship, S.S. Peninsula and S.S. Jane. Bencleugh was a 66-ton wooden schooner built at Port Chalmers, New Zealand in 1872 by Sutherland & Co., and registered in Dunedin, Otago, New Zealand. It was named after the Ben Line's Bencleuch which their father Watson and cousins Andrew, Alexander and William were part owners of.

In early July in 1877, with a crew of 19, Bencleugh left Port Chalmers, New Zealand, on a sealing trip. They originally sailed beyond Macquarie Island looking for Emerald Island. Emerald Island had first been reported in 1821 by the sailing ship Emerald. After finding no trace of the island, they concluded it never existed and began their return to Macquarie Island. The crew spent the next three weeks fighting storms of wind, snow, fog and hail, never able to land at Macquarie. During a break in the gales, the crew was able to land a whaling boat filled with supplies. The next day, 6 August 1877, a large wave overtook Bencleugh and pushed it into the breakers. The storm had driven the ship into a natural cleft in a reef, but the row boats had been washed ashore. The crew determined that the only viable option was to get off Bencleugh before it broke up was for a volunteer to swim to shore with a rope. Inches Thomson determined that as the ship's owner, he should be the one to attempt this dangerous feat. His first attempt failed and he was pushed back by the sea, but his second effort to swim through the kelp fields and the icy water was successful. Using the rope as their guide, the entire crew was able to make their way off the ship and onto Macquarie Island.

As a sealing island, Macquarie Island had several crude sealing huts on it. The Bencleugh crew was able to seek refuge in them. Many of the crew had tossed their coats and shoes in preparation for their swim to shore, so even the minimal protection the huts provided was a welcome relief.

Two of the crew had either broken or dislocated legs, and several more had other injuries. The night after the shipwreck, chief harpooner, Henry Whalley, died in one of the huts of his injuries. Whalley was buried on the island.

The day after the shipwreck the crew was able to salvage additional supplies from Bencleugh before it broke up. These were used to supplement the provisions the crew had offloaded the day before. The sails were cut up and used as blankets and to cover the tops of the huts. The men also combed the beaches daily for tossed items that the tide eventually washed in. Included in the items the crew was able to salvage were several casks of food, a whole box of tobacco and a rifle.

Fourteen days after Bencleugh shipwrecked, her sister ship Friendship arrived at Macquarie Island. The Friendship had left Port Chalmers shortly after Bencleugh. After a short sealing run, Friendship left with Bencleugh's three injured sailors and as many of the remainder of Bencleugh's crew as could be arranged and returned to Port Chalmers. After arriving at Port Chalmers, Friendship was immediately fitted out again and dispatched back to Macquarie Island. The Friendship finally returned nearly four months after the wreck of Bencleugh. Bencleugh's crew busied themselves on the island by sealing and had made 15 tons of oil by the time of the Friendship's return. After four challenging months, with many of the crew wearing sailcloth for clothes, Bencleugh's crew arrived back in New Zealand in time to celebrate Christmas 1877.

Bencleugh was insured in the Victoria, Australia, office for £800.

== Book ==
Sealing Huts on Macquarie Island, Sketch by John Sen Inches Thomson

In 1912, Inches Thomson's book, Voyages and Wanderings in Far Off Lands and Seas, was published by Headley Brothers, London. The book detailed Inches Thomson's experiences sailing the seas as a sealer and whaler, including his four months stranded on Macquarie Island. In addition to writing the text, Inches Thomson also completed several accompanying illustrations. The Scotsman Newspaper's review of the book opened with this gracious summary: "Mr. Thomson's all too brief narrative of the incidents on his voyages and wanderings must be given a high place among the literature of travel and adventure." The book was reprinted under the same title by gt gt niece, Rosy Fenwicke, in 2023 by Wonderful World publishers.

== Personal life ==
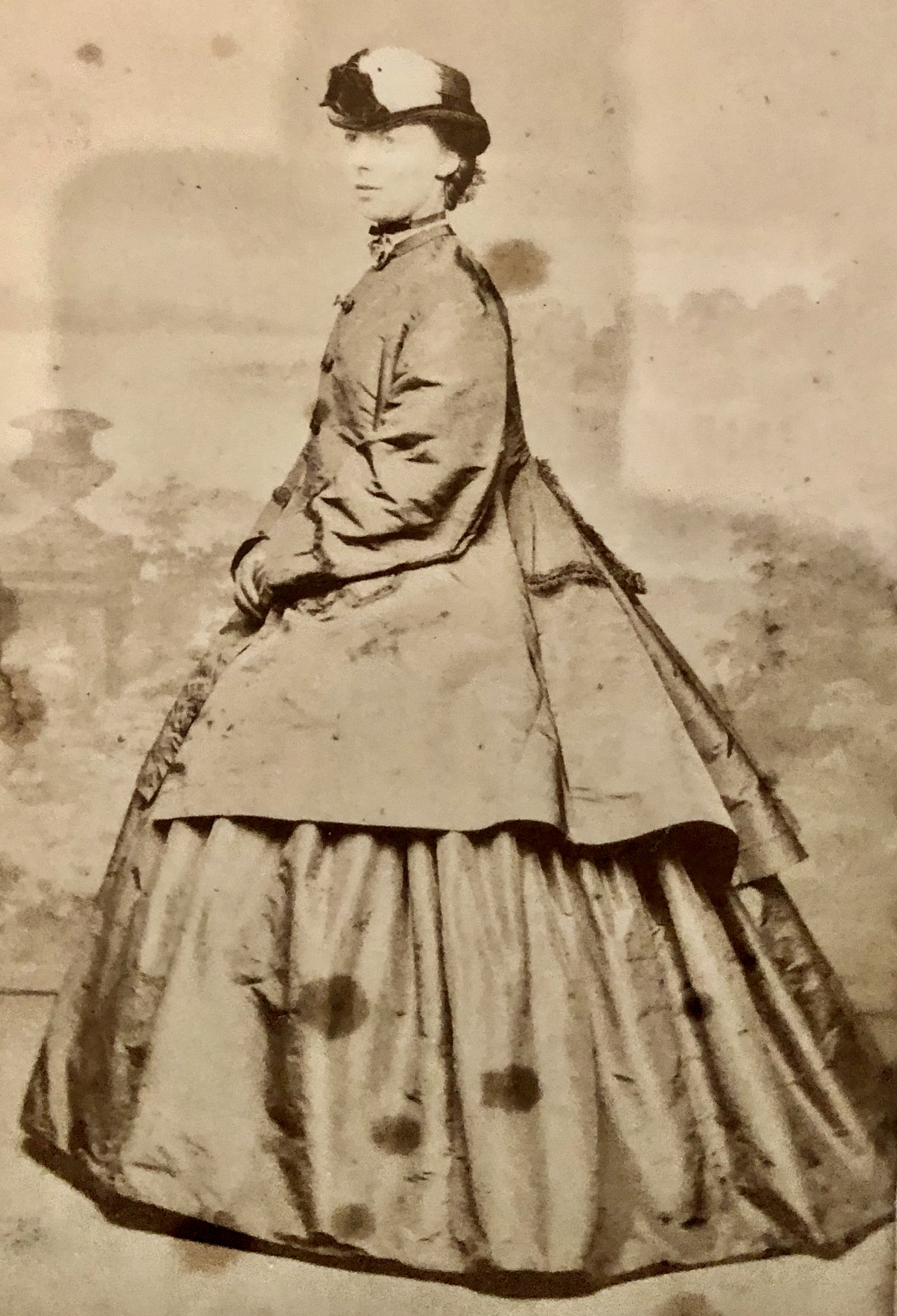
Margaret Anne Inches Thomson in 1900

Born John Thomson in 1844 in Alloa, Clackmannan, Scotland, His father was shipowner, Watson Thomson, whose first cousins Alexander and William founded The Ben Line. Several responses to 11 - 14 year old John's letters are reproduced in the 1850s letter collection, Sailing Upside Down Under by Blair Thomson in 2023.

In 1862 aboard the Nelson, John (17) emigrated to New Zealand to join his brother Andrew in business. They set up the ship chandlery and ironmonger business, "Thomson Bros" which operated until the early-1890s. John was for many years responsible for the company's fleet of 21 'lighter' boats. The business set up the gas works for street lighting in Port Chalmers. Another innovation was establishing the second freezing works in Otago. When the partnership was dissolved in mid 1884, John moved to Melbourne where he patented the 'black box' forerunner, a maritime device for recording the course of a vessel and an improved pneumatic butter churn which sold well.

John added 'Inches' to his surname after his 1896 marriage to Margaret Anne Inches. Margaret, or Maggie as she was known, was the only child of Charles Hood Inches of Hope Park, Blairgowrie, in Perthshire. The couple lived in this home and at 36 Royal Terrace, Edinburgh. It is believed the John's name addition (Inches) was intended to honour his wife's family. Margaret and her father were members of the Smalls of Dirnanean. The couple had no children.

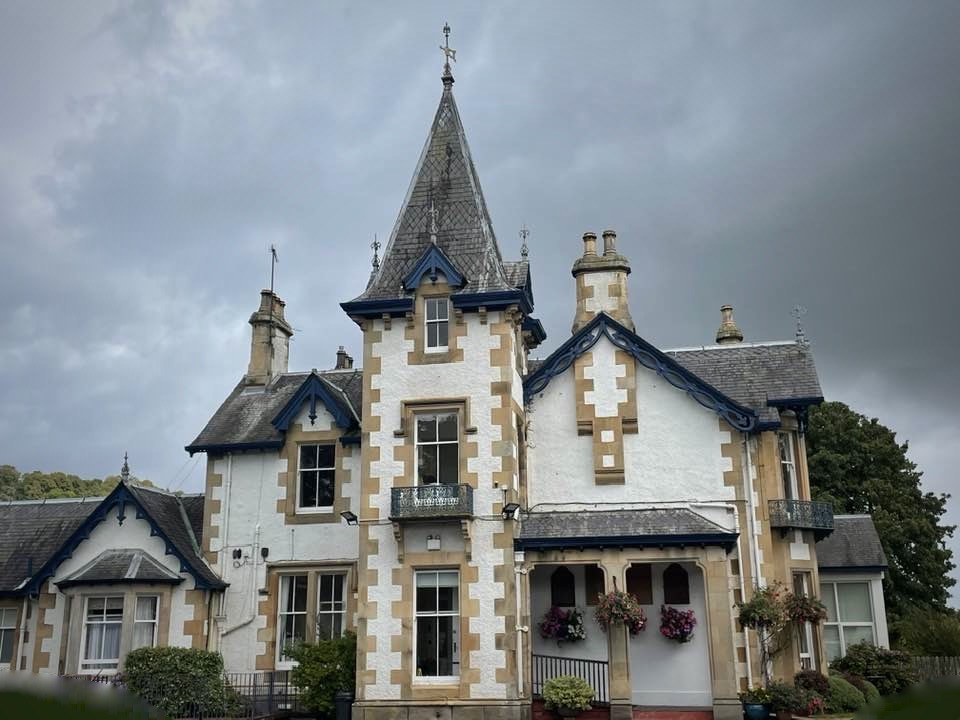
Hope Park - family home of Margaret Inches where she and John lived.

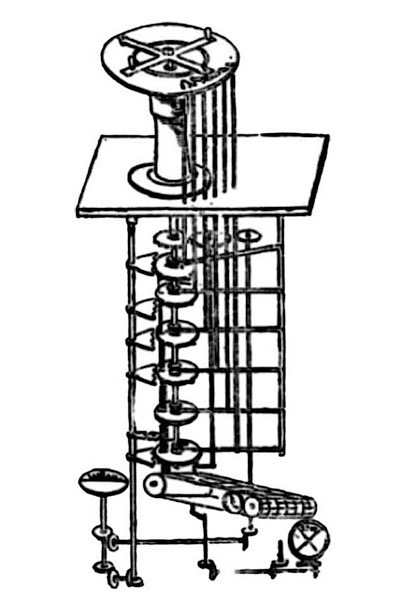
'black box' forerunner invented by John Inches Thomson

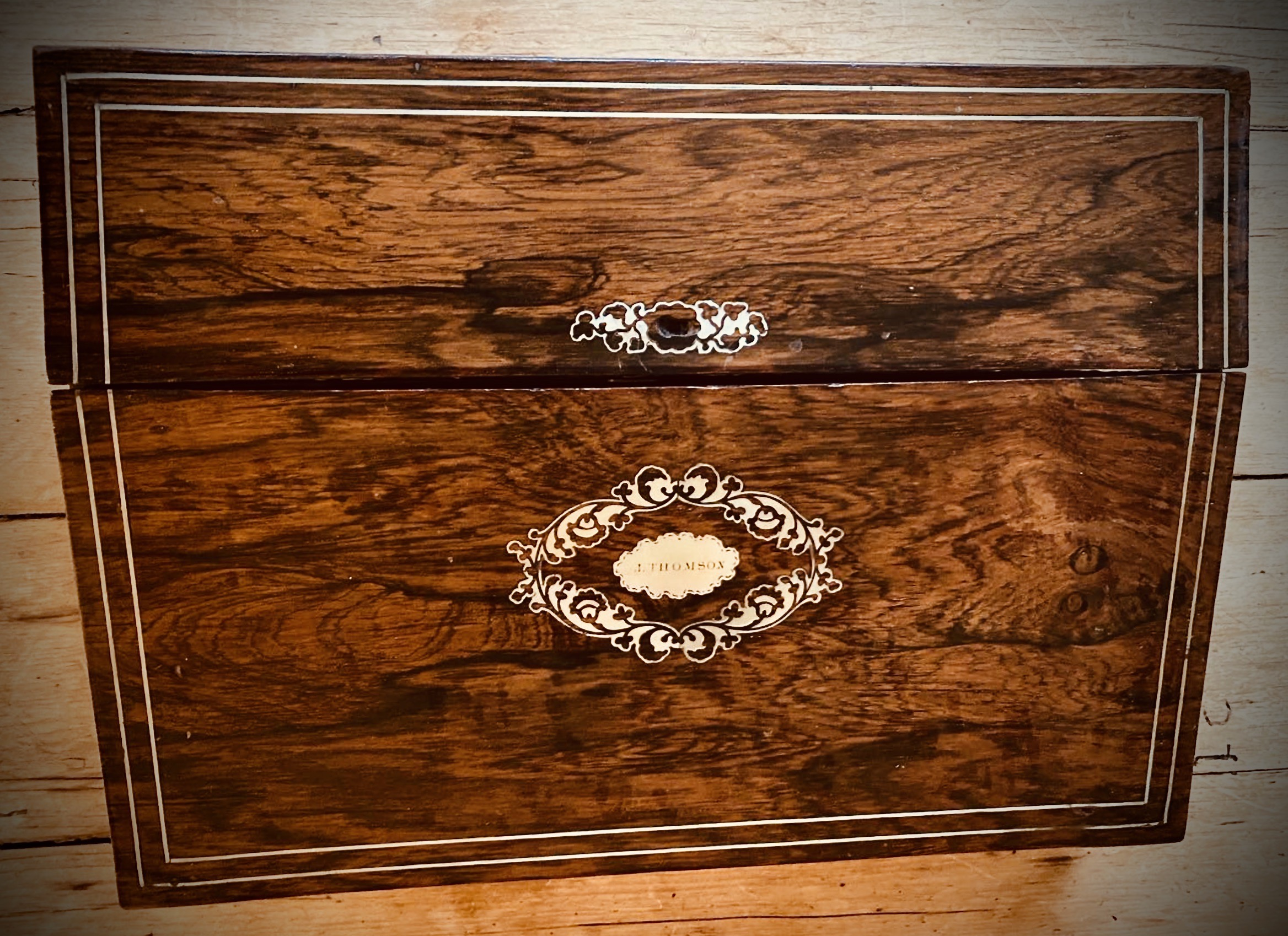
The writing box of John Thomson

Margaret Inches Thomson died in 1919 and is buried in the Inches family plot in Blairgowrie Cemetery. After his wife's death, Inches Thomson removed to New Zealand where his late brother Andrew's family and his cousin, Captain William Thomson of Alloa, lived. He died there at Dunedin on 20 March 1933. A full collection of newspaper articles on John, his brother Andrew and the businesses of Thomson Bros, Port Chalmers has been published in 2024.[12]
