= Struthers' ligament =

Ligament of the humerus

Diagram showing location of Struthers' ligament

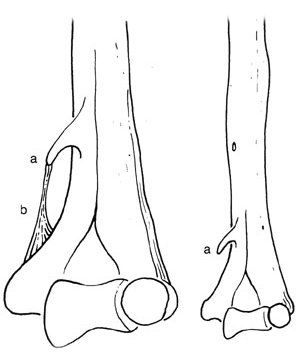
Illustration by John Struthers, 1854: a) osseous process b) ligament

Struthers' ligament is a feature of human anatomy consisting of a band of connective tissue at the medial aspect of the distal humerus. It courses from the supracondylar process of the humerus (also known as avian spur) to the medial epicondyle of the humerus. It is not a constant ligament, and can be acquired or congenital. The structure was highlighted by John Struthers, who discussed the feature's evolutionary significance with Charles Darwin. Struthers originally reported that the ligament usually arose at a position 3.2 to 6.4 cm from the medial condyle, being 1.2 to 1.9 cm in length, and nearer to the anterior than the medial border of the humerus.

The clinical significance of this structure is due to the median nerve and brachial artery which may pass underneath the "arch" formed by the process and ligament over the humeral body. Within this space the nerve may be compressed leading to supracondylar process syndrome. the arcade of Struthers is located nearby and is a fascial band running between the medial head of triceps and the medial inter muscular septum, it is a distinct entity to the ligament of Struthers. The arcade is involved in ulnar nerve compression, usually post transposition, the ligament is not.

== Prevalence ==
The ligament is not always present, and there is some debate as to its prevalence. Struthers originally estimated that it was present in 1% of humans.

== Historical significance ==
The structure was originally depicted by Tiedemann, and later by Knox in the early 19th century, but John Struthers was the first to draw attention to this structure in 1848 as a "peculiar process" that bore curious resemblance to anatomy that he had seen in cats. This observation was one of many that Struthers made in subsequent investigations of vestigial and rudimentary structures, and in sharing these observations with his contemporary, Charles Darwin, provided significant evidence for the theories of evolution. Charles Darwin took the ligament to mean that humans and other mammals had a common ancestor, and used Struthers' work as evidence in Chapter 1 of his Descent of Man (1871). Struthers went on to create a museum of Comparative Anatomy filled with zoological specimens to illustrate Darwin's theory of common descent.
