= William McGonagall =

Scottish-Irish poet (1825–1902)

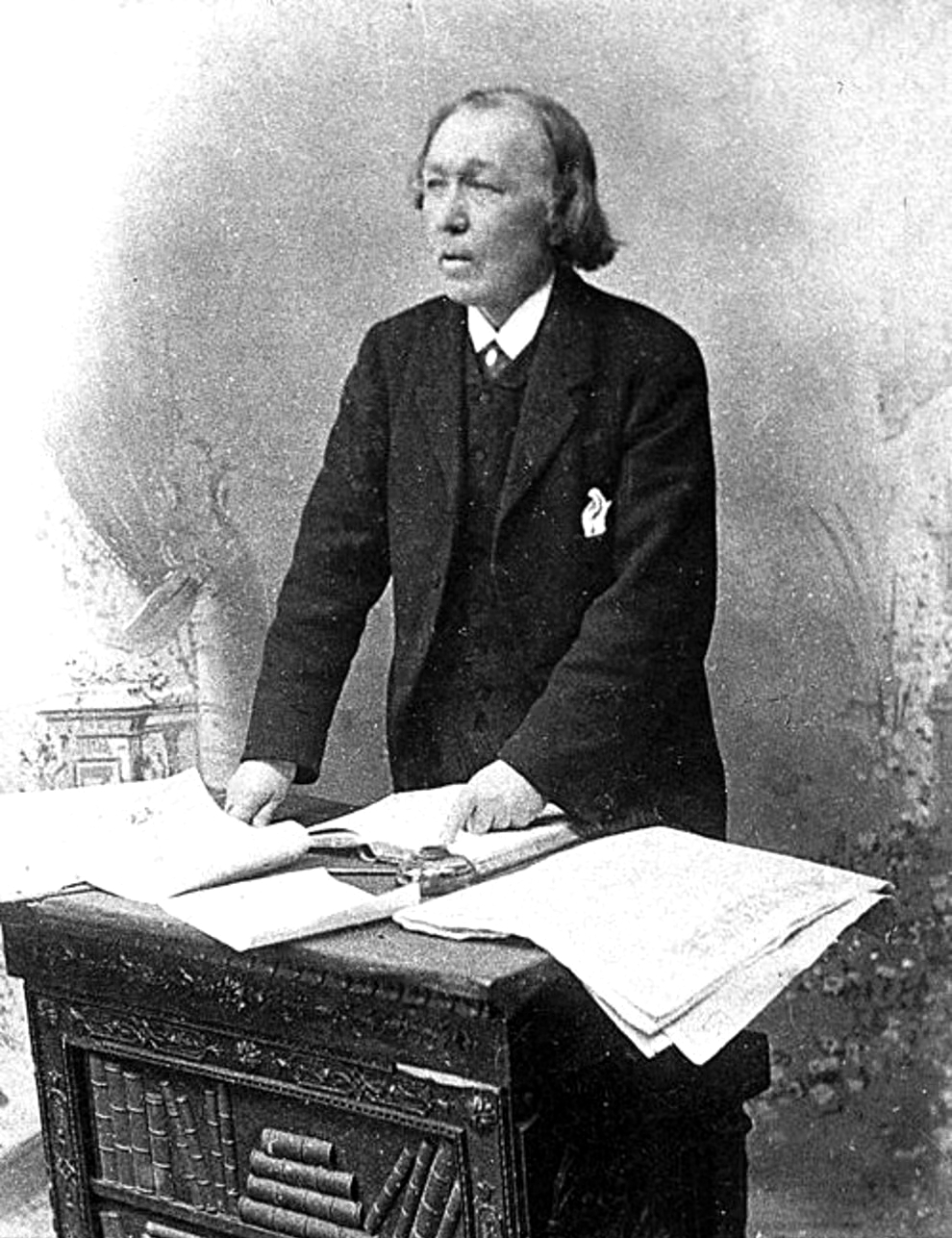
- Born: March 1825; Either Ireland or Edinburgh, Scotland
- Died: 29 September 1902 (aged 77); Greyfriars Parish, Edinburgh
- Occupations: Weaver, actor, poet
- Spouse: Jean King
- Children: 7
- Writing career
- Language: English
- Genre: Poetry

William McGonagall (March 1825 – 29 September 1902) was a Scottish poet and public performer. He gained notoriety as an exceptionally poor poet (also called a poetaster) who exhibited no recognition of or concern for his peers' opinions of his work. McGonagall wrote about 200 poems, including "The Tay Bridge Disaster" and "The Famous Tay Whale", which are widely regarded as some of the worst in English literature. Groups throughout Scotland engaged him to give recitations from his work, and contemporary descriptions of these performances indicate that many listeners appreciated McGonagall's apparent skill as a comic music hall character. Collections of his verse remain popular, with several volumes available today.

McGonagall has been lampooned as the worst poet in British history. The chief criticisms are that he was deaf to poetic metaphor and either unable or unwilling to have his language scan correctly. His only apparent understanding of poetry was his belief that it needed to rhyme. McGonagall's fame stems from the humorous effects these issues produced in his work. Scholars have argued that his inappropriate rhythms, weak vocabulary, and ill-advised imagery combine to make his work amongst the most unintentionally amusing dramatic poetry in the English language. His work is in a long tradition of narrative ballads and verse written and published about great events and tragedies, and widely circulated among the local population as fliers.

== Origins and early life ==
William McGonagall's parents, Charles and Margaret, were Irish. His Irish surname is a variation on Mag Congail, a popular name in County Donegal. Throughout his adult life he claimed to have been born in Edinburgh, giving his year of birth variously as 1825 or 1830, but his entry in the 1841 Census gives his place of birth, like his parents', as "Ireland". Biographer Norman Watson suggests that McGonagall may have falsified his place of birth, as a native-born Scotsman would be better treated under the Poor Law of 1845 than one born in Ireland. By looking at census, marriage and death records, David Phillips identifies 1825 as the more likely birth date.

The McGonagall family moved several times in search of work, possibly spending time in Glasgow and on South Ronaldsay before settling in Dundee around 1840. Here, William was apprenticed to follow his father's trade as a handloom weaver, putting an end to any formal education he may have had. Having learned his trade, McGonagall proceeded to educate himself, taking "great delight in reading books", particularly cheap editions of Shakespeare's plays.

On 11 July 1846, McGonagall married Jean King, a fellow mill worker from Stirling. Together they had five sons and two daughters. Despite the Industrial Revolution slowly making weavers obsolete, McGonagall apparently prospered, as there was still need for skilled workers to perform tasks of great complexity.

Whilst working at the loom, McGonagall would entertain his shopmates with recitations from Shakespeare. On one occasion, they paid a local theatre owner to allow him to appear in the title role in a production of Macbeth. Convinced that the actor playing Macduff was envious of him, McGonagall refused to die in the final act. For this performance, The Book of Heroic Failures awarded him the title of "worst Macbeth" as well as "worst British poet".

== Career ==
The turning point in McGonagall's life came in June 1877. After his eldest daughter shamed the family by giving birth to an illegitimate child, work as a weaver became more difficult to find. At this point, McGonagall was seized with a new inspiration:

I seemed to feel as it were a strange kind of feeling stealing over me, and remained so for about five minutes. A flame, as Lord Byron has said, seemed to kindle up my entire frame, along with a strong desire to write poetry; and I felt so happy, so happy, that I was inclined to dance, then I began to pace backwards and forwards in the room, trying to shake off all thought of writing poetry; but the more I tried, the more strong the sensation became. It was so strong, I imagined that a pen was in my right hand, and a voice crying, "Write! Write!"

McGonagall realised that if he were to succeed as a poet he required a patron, and so wrote to Queen Victoria seeking her patronage. He received a letter of rejection written by a royal functionary, thanking him for his interest. McGonagall took this as praise for his work. During a trip to Dunfermline in 1879, he was mocked by the Chief Templar at the International Organisation of Good Templars, of which McGonagall was a member, who told him his poetry was very bad. McGonagall told the man that "it was so very bad that Her Majesty had thanked McGonagall for what the Chief Templar had condemned."

The letter gave McGonagall confidence in his "poetic abilities", and he felt his reputation could be enhanced if he were to give a live performance before the Queen. In July 1878, he walked from Dundee to Balmoral, a distance of about 60 miles (97 km) over mountainous terrain and through a violent thunderstorm to perform for Queen Victoria. When he arrived, he announced himself as "The Queen's Poet". The guards informed him "You're not the Queen's poet! Tennyson is the Queen's poet!" At that time, Alfred, Lord Tennyson was the Poet Laureate. McGonagall presented the letter but was refused entry and had to return home. Undeterred, he continued writing poetry and reported events to the newspapers, earning some minor recognition.

Throughout his life, McGonagall campaigned against excessive drinking, appearing in pubs and bars to give edifying poems and speeches that proved popular. He met with the ire of publicans, on one occasion being pelted with peas for reciting a poem about the evils of "strong drink".

McGonagall's performances quickly gained a reputation for leading to raucous audience reception, frequently being interrupted and drowned out during his recitations, being pelted with food, and on some occasions being forcefully carried out of the venue and paraded on attendees' shoulders in the streets. Despite this, in an April 1880 interview, McGonagall seemed convinced of his own poetic prowess, declaring to the reporter that he was "more versatile than Shakespeare" and that the only man that could match McGonagall was Edmund Kean. Three months later, McGonagall sustained injuries to his head and left arm when a crowd, either accidentally or purposefully, dropped him onto the street while carrying him on their shoulders following a performance: he reportedly attributed his survival to his "good thick felt hat, [his] long and thick Bohemian locks, and above all, the 'genius of poetry.'"

In 1883 he celebrated the official opening of University College, Dundee with the poem "The Inauguration of University College Dundee" which opens with the stanza:

Good people of Dundee, your voices raise,
And to Miss Baxter give great praise;
Rejoice and sing and dance with glee,
Because she has founded a college in Bonnie Dundee.

McGonagall always struggled financially and earned money by selling his poems in the streets or reciting them in halls, theatres, and public houses. When he dealt with financial insecurity, his friends supported him with donations. In 1880, he sailed to London to seek his fortune, and in 1887 to New York. In both instances, he returned unsuccessful.

In 1885, McGonagall aided in distributing a supposed autobiography of him entitled "The Book of the Lamentations of the Poet Macgonagall", which had been written following a collaboration with a reporter named John Willocks. McGonagall was met with confusion when the proctor of a local school closed the book with contempt after reading one of the first sentences. McGonagall himself had not read the book prior to selling it, which had the phrase "dedicated to himself, knowing none greater" inscribed on the front cover. The supposed autobiography had portrayed him as a pompous man with an overly obscure vocabulary who constantly looked down on others in his life, while also frequently being subject to his domineering wife: the opening sentence that caused the most issue read:

My parents were both poor, but bibulous — the latter fact accounting in no small measure for the former.

McGonagall initially believed that the word "bibulous" referred to his parents being devoted to Christianity even in hard times, but was enraged once the proctor explained that the word actually referred to being drunkards. After he threatened to sue Willocks, the latter withdrew the book from publication and wrote him a letter of apology. However, in 1905, three years after McGonagall's death, Willocks did republish the book. McGonagall subsequently wrote a poem about temperance, which he dedicated to his deceased "sober living & god-fearing" parents, opening with:

My parents were sober living, and often did pray
For their family to abstain from intoxicating drink alway;
Because they knew it would lead them astray
Which no God fearing man will dare to gainsay.

Starting in December 1888, McGonagall found lucrative work performing his poetry at a local circus presented by entertainer Burlington Brumell. He would read his poems while the crowd was permitted to pelt him with eggs, flour, herrings, potatoes, and stale bread. He received fifteen shillings a night for this arrangement, and mostly seemed fine with it despite occasionally losing his temper and ending his performances early due to the crowd's treatment. However, when Brumell was in the process of renewing a year-long license for the circus in August 1889, the magistrates threatened to withhold it unless the "lower-class" entertainments were discontinued; Brumell conceded and discontinued McGonagall's employment.

Throughout his life, McGonagall seemed oblivious to the general opinion of his poems, even when his audience was pelting him with eggs and vegetables. Author Norman Watson speculated in his biography of McGonagall that the latter may have been on the autism spectrum. Christopher Hart, writing in The Sunday Times, said that this seems "likely".

In 1890, McGonagall was in dire financial straits. To help him, his friends funded the publication of a collection of his work, Poetic Gems. The proceeds provided McGonagall with enough money to live on for a time. By 1893, he was annoyed by his mistreatment at the hands of the public and wrote an angry poem threatening to leave Dundee. One newspaper quipped that he would probably stay for another year once he realised "that Dundee rhymes with 1893". Though he tried his hand at writing prose and endorsements for local businesses for a short time, he and his wife were forced to move to Perth in 1894. Soon after, he received a letter purporting to be from representatives of King Thibaw Min of Burma. In it, he was informed that the King had knighted him as "Topaz McGonagall, Grand Knight of the Holy Order of the White Elephant Burmah". Despite the fact that this was a fairly transparent hoax, McGonagall would refer to himself as "Sir William Topaz McGonagall, Knight of the White Elephant, Burmah" in his advertising for the rest of his life.

In 1895, McGonagall and his wife moved to Edinburgh. Here, he met with some success, briefly developing a cult following and being in great demand. This state of affairs did not last long, and by 1900 he was once again destitute, as well as now old and sickly. Though he was now too frail to walk the streets selling his poems, donations from friends continued to keep him afloat.

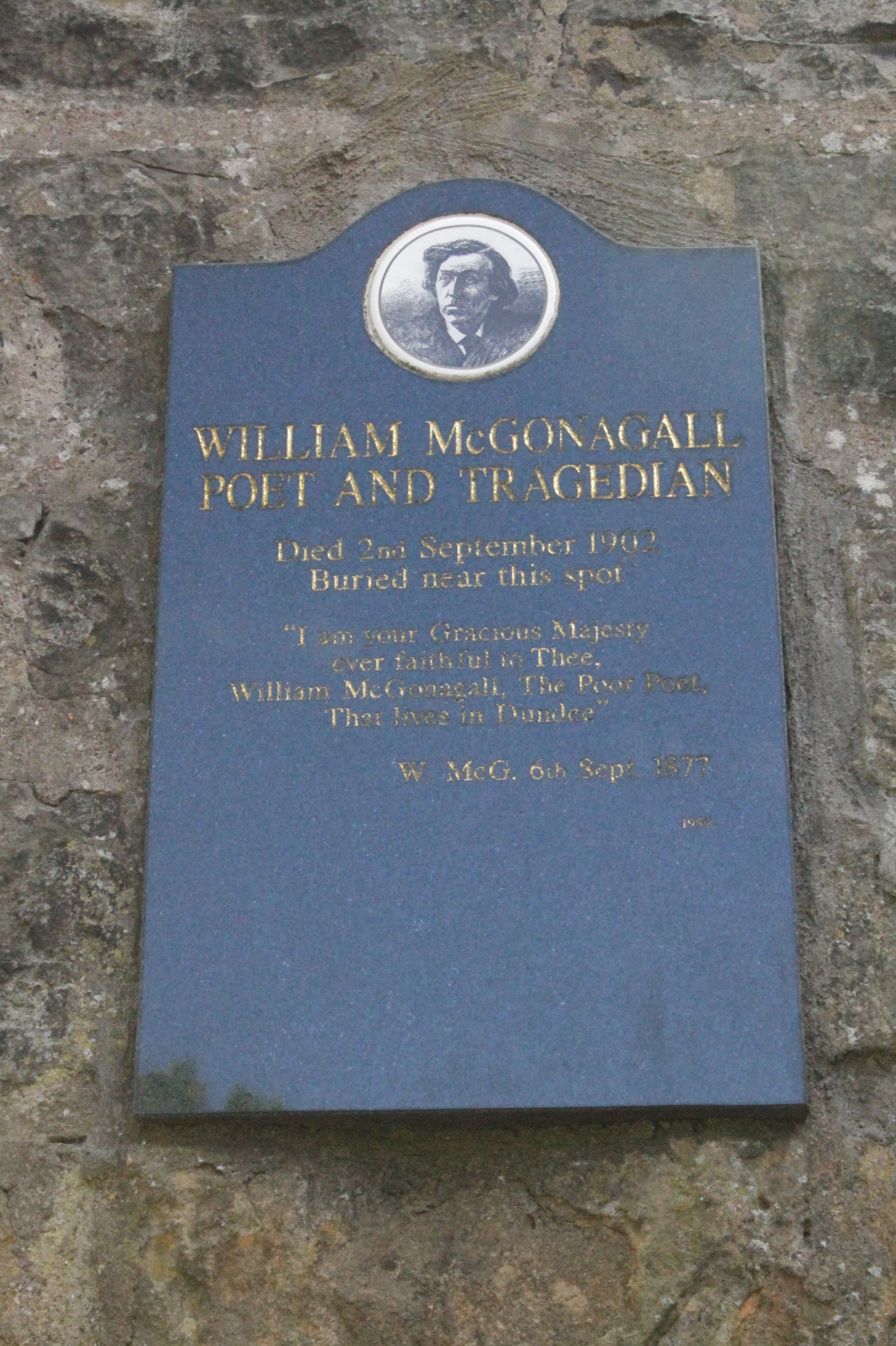
Memorial to William McGonagall in Greyfriars Kirkyard

McGonagall died penniless in 1902, above what is now The Captain's Bar in Edinburgh's South College Street, and was buried in an unmarked grave in Greyfriars Kirkyard in Edinburgh. A wall-mounted memorial installed to his memory in 1999 is inscribed:

William McGonagall

Poet and Tragedian

"I am your gracious Majesty
ever faithful to Thee,
William McGonagall, the Poor Poet,
That lives in Dundee."

Additionally, a plaque above 5 South College Street in Edinburgh shows an image of McGonagall, and bears the inscription:

William McGonagall

Poet and Tragedian
Died Here
29 September 1902

== Tay Bridge Disaster ==
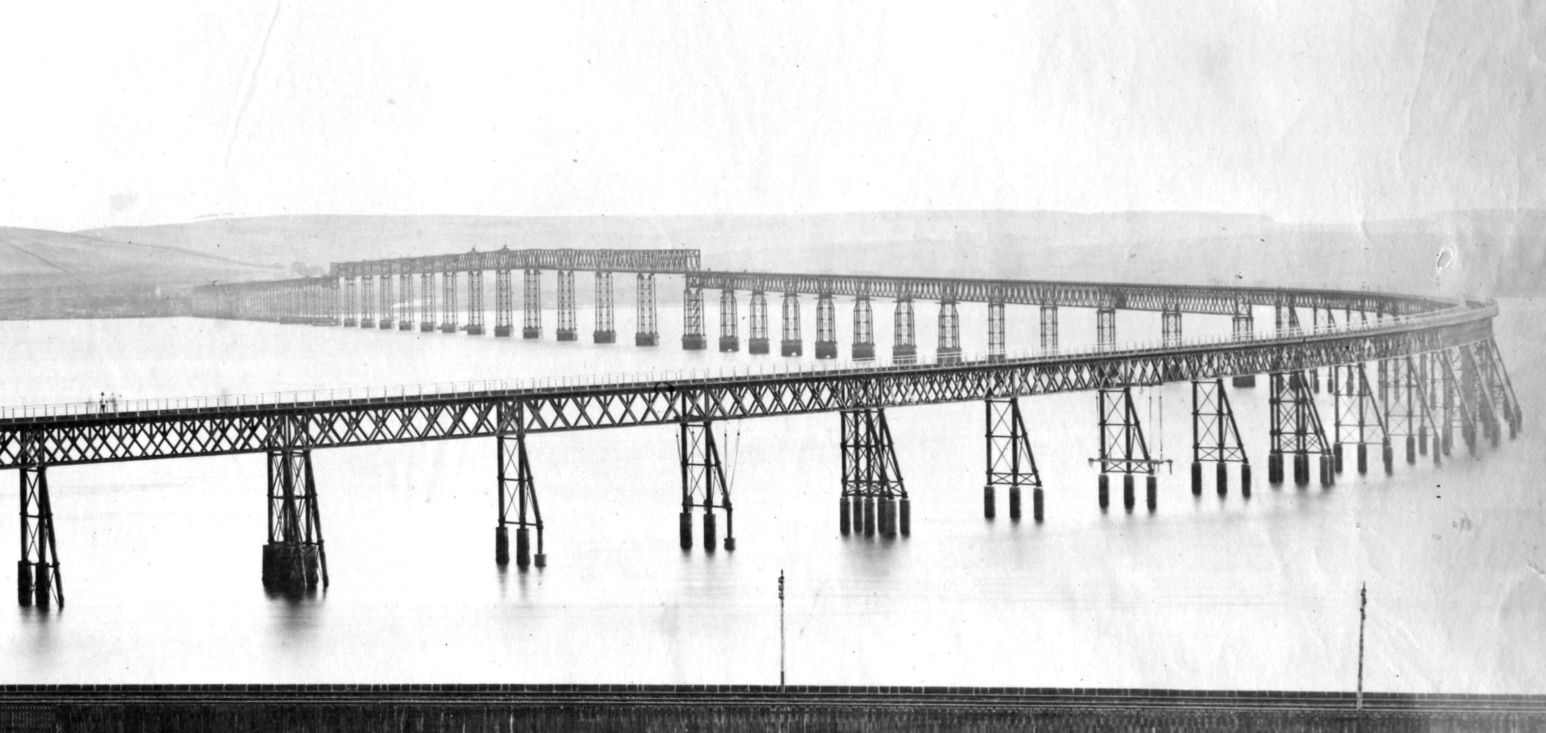
Original Tay Bridge (from the north).

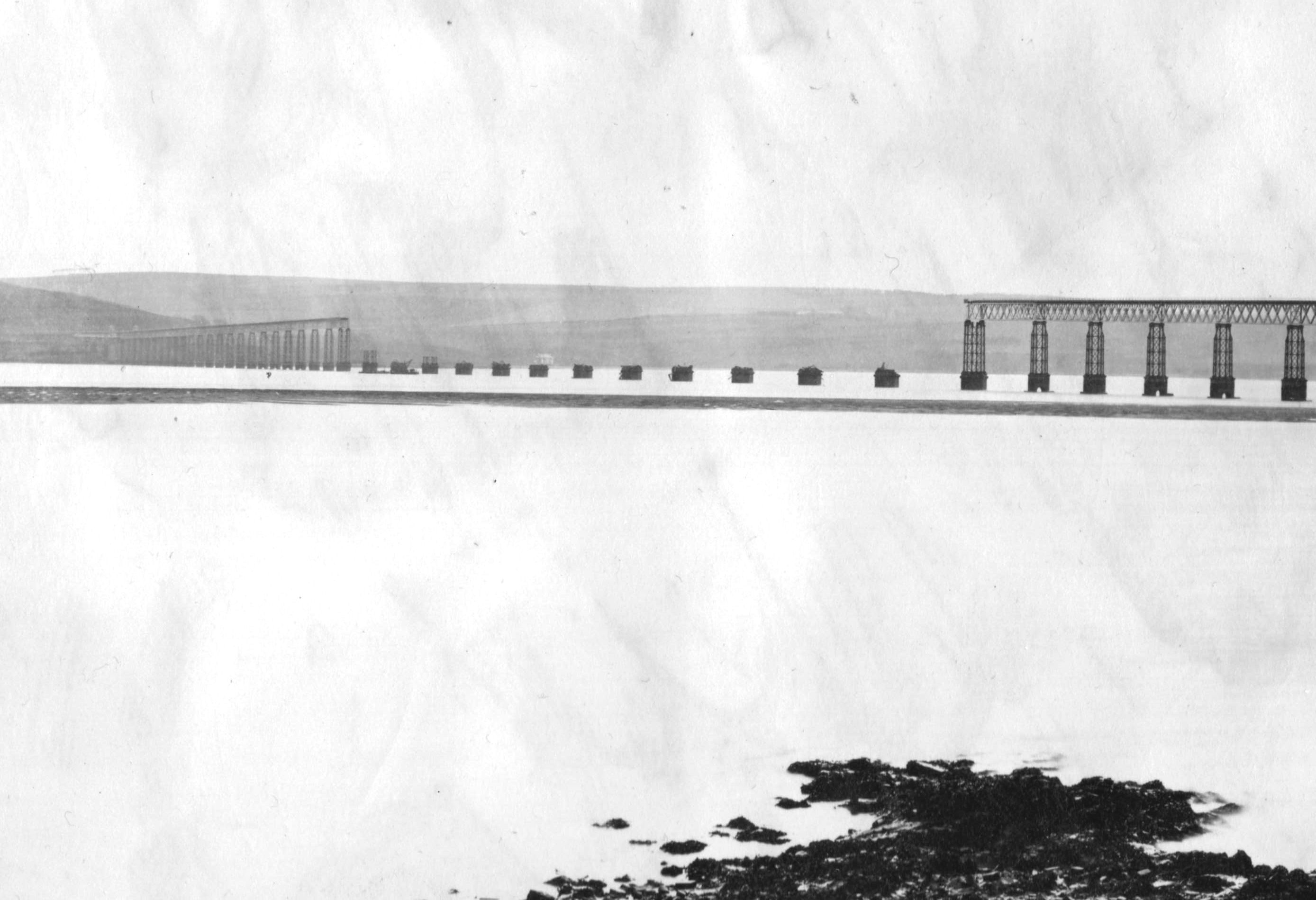
Original Tay Bridge (from the south) the day after the disaster.

McGonagall's 1880 lament "The Tay Bridge Disaster" has been widely reproduced. It recounts the events of the evening of 28 December 1879, when, during a severe gale, the Tay Rail Bridge near Dundee collapsed as a train was passing over it. It begins:

Beautiful Railway Bridge of the Silv'ry Tay!
Alas! I am very sorry to say
That ninety lives have been taken away
On the last Sabbath day of 1879,
Which will be remember'd for a very long time.

(Modern sources give the death toll as 75.)

And finishes:

I must now conclude my lay
By telling the world fearlessly without the least dismay
That your central girders would not have given way,
At least many sensible men do say,
Had they been supported on each side with buttresses,
At least many sensible men confesses,
For the stronger we our houses do build,
The less chance we have of being killed.

More than a year before the disaster, McGonagall had written a poem in praise of the Tay Bridge: "The Railway Bridge of the Silvery Tay", in which he specifically expressed a desire:

that God will protect all passengers
By night and by day,
And that no accident will befall them while crossing
The Bridge of the Silvery Tay,
For that would be most awful to be seen
Near by Dundee and the Magdalen Green

== Honours and memorials ==
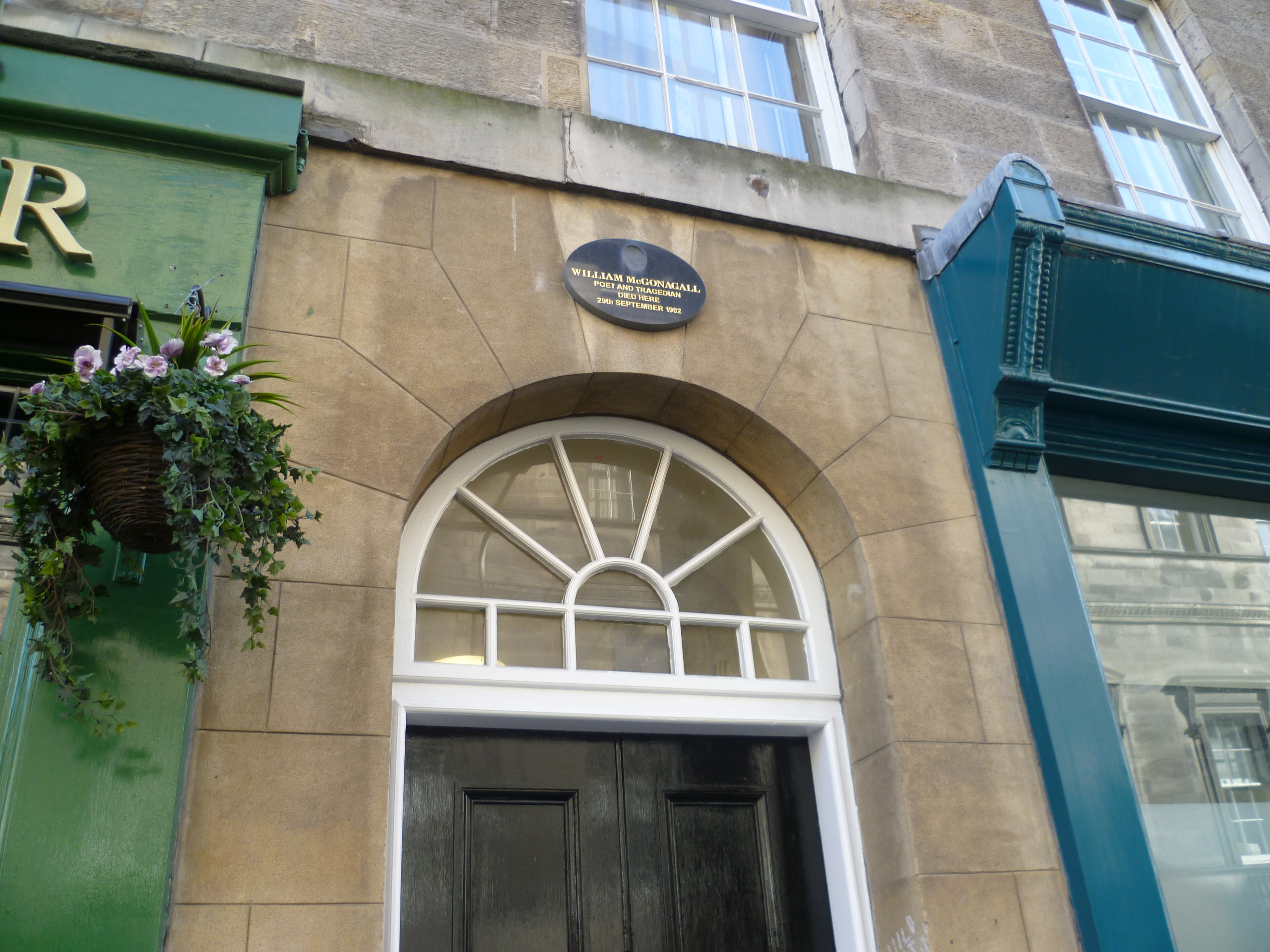
A plaque above McGonagall's last residence records his death in 1902

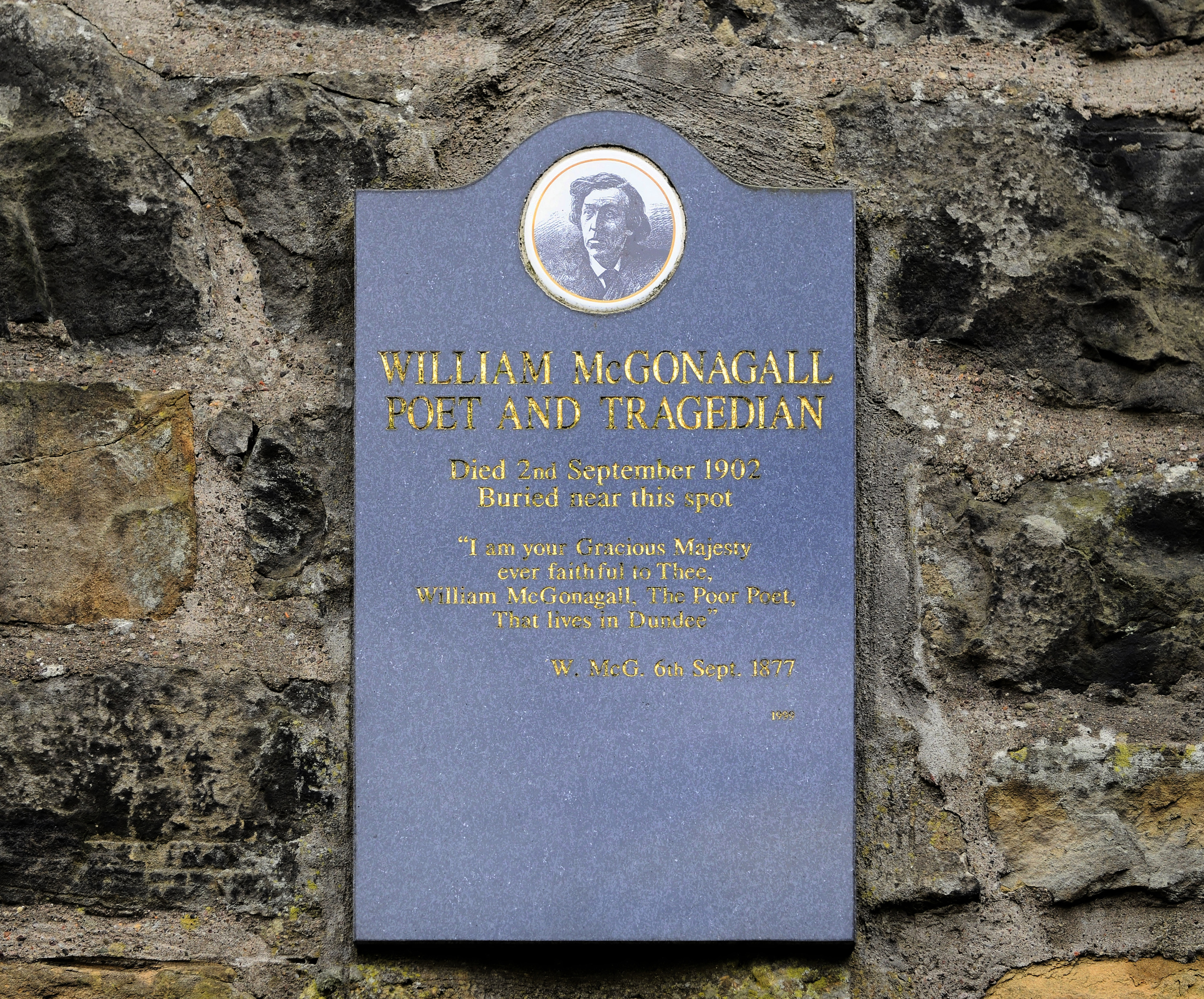
Memorial plaque near to McGonagall's grave in Edinburgh dated 1999

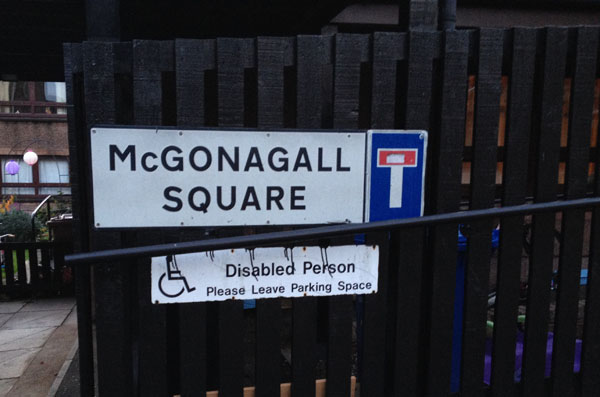
McGonagall Square in Dundee

McGonagall's home city of Dundee maintains several reminders of his life:

- The William Topaz McGonagall Appreciation Society held a McGonagall Supper on board the frigate Unicorn on 12 June 1997, during which the courses were allegedly served in reverse order, starting with the coffee and ending with the starters. A short play was performed by local actors.
- Beginning in 2004, the Dundee Science Centre Education Outreach has hosted an annual Charity McGonagall Gala Dinner, in which guests eat their meal backwards from dessert to starter and hear the welcome address as they depart, "combining traditional and unconventional entertainment, with four-course dinner, complimentary wine and whisky".
- There is a McGonagall Square in the West End of Dundee.
- A number of inscriptions of his poetry have been made, most notably along the side of the River Tay on the pavement of Riverside Drive in Dundee. This monument contains a deliberate spelling mistake reading, "Beatiful railway bridge of the silv'ry Tay".
- Dundee Central Library maintains a William McGonagall Collection of his works.

== See also ==
- Scottish literature
