= Coos Bay Wagon Road Lands =

Land in Oregon

The Coos Bay Wagon Road Lands is land managed by the United States Bureau of Land Management. The land was originally granted to the Oregon and California Railroad to create a road between Coos Bay, Oregon, and Roseburg, Oregon. The land was reconveyed to the United States in 1937.

== History ==
The Coos Bay Wagon Road Lands (CBWR) were originally granted to the Oregon and California Railroad in 1866. They include odd-numbered sections in a six-mile swath between Coos Bay and Roseburg. The grant, which was intended to finance construction of a military road between the two towns, was forfeited by the railroad for violating grant provisions identical to those that caused the revestment of the Oregon and California Railroad Revested Lands (O&C Lands). On February 26, 1919 federal legislation was enacted to reconvey to the United States approximately 73,583 acres of land in Coos and Douglas counties that had been conveyed by the United States to the Coos Bay Wagon Road. Congress enacted the Oregon and California Revested Lands Sustained Yield Management Act of 1937 (43 U.S.C. § 1181f), directing the Secretary of Interior to manage the reconveyed Coos Bay Wagon Road Lands for permanent forest production under the principle of sustained yield, for the purpose of providing a permanent source of timber supply, protecting watersheds, regulating stream flow, and contributing to the economic stability of local communities and industries. The act also directed the secretary to provide recreational facilities and establish a formula to pay revenues from forest production on the reconveyed lands to Coos and Douglas counties in lieu of taxes in proportion to the relative assessed value of the reconveyed lands in each county.

== Forest management and county revenue ==
The Coos Bay Wagon Road Lands are currently managed by the Bureau of Land Management (BLM), a unit of the United States Department of the Interior. The CBWR and O&C Lands have both been subject to significant litigation over the management of timber resources, a portion of whose revenues are shared with local counties for public services. As litigation increased over the harvest of public timber in the Pacific Northwest in the late 1980s, Congress recognized that the potential reduction in timber sale volume and revenues associated with the controversy would cause extreme financial uncertainty for the O&C counties (including the two counties with CBWR). To stabilize payments to these counties, appropriations language in 1991, 1992, and 1993 included provisions for a "floor" payment to the O&C counties. The "floor" was equal to the annual average payments covering the five-year period between 1986 and 1990. In 1994, the Northwest Forest Plan was established to provide a stable supply of timber and protection of fish and wildlife habitat for 22.1 million acres of federal forest in Western Oregon, Western Washington, and Northern California (including 2.7 million acres of BLM-administered forests). To account for lower levels of timber harvest necessary to protect water quality and habitat for fish and wildlife Congress created a county payment "safety net" and, in 2000, payments to O&C counties have been legislated under the Secure Rural Schools and Community Self-Determination Act of 2000 (Pub. L. 106–393 (text) (PDF)).

== Forest management pilot project ==
In 2011, U.S. Secretary of the Interior Ken Salazar endorsed a demonstration timber sale pilot project on federal forest lands along Coos Bay Wagon Road in coordination with two professors. The pilot project is intended to demonstrate the ecosystem principles of K. Norm Johnson, professor of forestry resources at Oregon State University, and Jerry Franklin, professor of ecosystem science at the University of Washington. These principles include variable retention regeneration harvest (clearcutting with retention patches) in the Oregon Coast Range. Under the terms of the demonstration project, the Coquille Tribe and the Coos Bay District BLM will work together to plan and implement the project, combining the skills of Dr. Johnson and Dr. Franklin and the BLM and Coquille Tribe's natural resource professionals. Resulting timber sales was intended to comply with all BLM requirements, however the resulting timber sale was protested by conservation groups alleging violations of the National Environmental Policy Act and the Federal Land Policy and Management Act. The pilot project will include about 130 acres of timber harvest. The Coos County Coos Bay Wagon Road lands are part of the Coquille Tribe's ancestral homeland. The Coquille Tribe was given over 4,000 acres of federal forest land through legislation adopted in 1995.

== Proposal to change forest management of CBWR ==
In 2011, a group of local stakeholders proposed a way to increase the revenues generated from the CBWR in order to provide Coos County with a stable amount of funding. The proposal, which would require federal legislation, is supported by Coos County Board of Commissioners and would keep the CBWR in BLM ownership. However, management of the timber on 51,000 acres would be transferred to the Coquille Indian Tribe and managed under the National Indian Forest Resources Management Act. Fifty percent of timber revenues would be given to Coos County. The other fifty percent would pay for forest management and restoration and investment in local economic development.
