= Whiteson, Oregon =

Unincorporated community in the state of Oregon, United States

Whiteson
- Unincorporated community
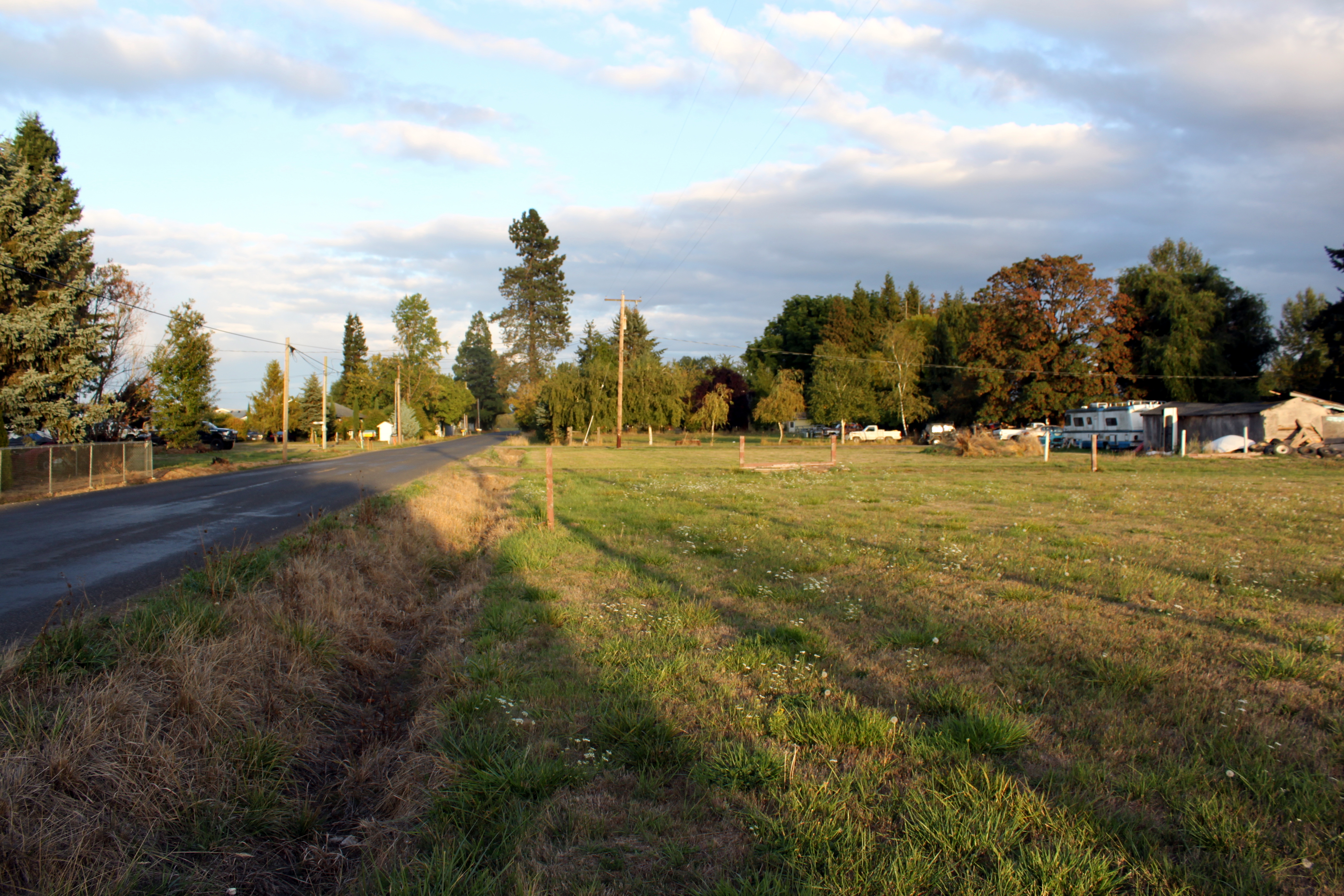
- Whiteson Road and field in Whiteson

- Location within the state of Oregon Whiteson (the United States)
- Coordinates: 45°09′05″N 123°11′48″W
- Country: United States
- State: Oregon
- County: Yamhill
- Elevation: 164 ft (50 m)
- Time zone: UTC-8 (Pacific (PST))
  - Summer (DST): UTC-7 (PDT)
- GNIS feature ID: 1166722

Whiteson is an unincorporated community in Yamhill County, Oregon, United States. Oregon Geographic Names states that Whiteson is named for either for Henry White, who laid out the town site and gave the railroad right-of-way, or for William White. It is possible they are members of the same family. Whiteson post office was established in 1890. Whiteson is an agricultural community that relies on the neighboring communities of McMinnville and Amity for basic services such as fire, health, and education. The Yamhill County Sheriff has primary police jurisdiction over Whiteson.

== Geography ==
Whiteson is located 3 miles south of McMinnville, on Oregon Route 99W, near Whiteson Dip Bridge.

=== Climate ===
This region experiences warm (but not hot) and dry summers, with no average monthly temperatures above 71.6 °F. According to the Köppen Climate Classification system, Whiteson has a warm-summer Mediterranean climate, abbreviated "Csb" on climate maps.

== Education ==
Whiteson School District 78 was established in 1892, and the first one-room schoolhouse was finished in March 1893. In 1903, another room was added to the school. 1936 was the last year school was taught here, before the district finally consolidated with Amity School District 4, in 1942.

== Rail transport ==
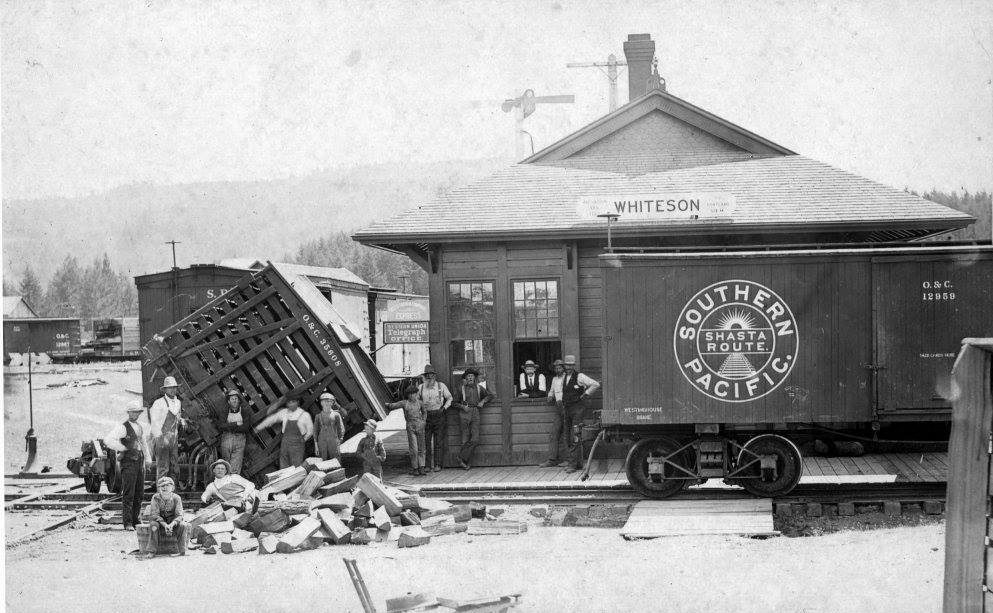
Rail accident at Whiteson, 1891–1905

Whiteson railway station is the railway station, where the Dayton, Sheridan and Grande Ronde Railroad crossed the West Side line of the Oregon and California Railroad.

Whiteson was formerly a notable station along the Red Electric interurban network. Initial service extended from Portland to Whiteson, but eventually reached Corvallis in 1917. By 1920, the schedule had four daily trains through from Portland to Corvallis in each direction and two more that ran as far as Whiteson.

The railway station was on the 22.95 miles (36.93 km) long mainline of the Dayton Sheridan & Grande Ronde Railroad from Dayton via Whiteson and Sheridan Junction (Broadmead) to Smithfield.

The 3 ft (914 mm) narrow gauge line was converted to standard gauge in 1891. By 1905 the line between Whiteson and Dayton was abandoned. Since then the former diamond crossing has been replaced by a wye junction only, which is still in use.
