= County payments =

County payments are the United States Forest Service payments of 25% of gross revenues from each national forest to the states for use on the road and school programs in the counties where the national forests are located. The payments are technically known as Payments to States, because the states determine which road and school programs can be funded. However, the payments are allocated to the counties based on the national forest acreage in each county. County payments were modified temporarily by the Secure Rural Schools and Community Self-Determination Act of 2000 (P.L. 106-393).

County payments are not to be confused with Payments to States and Territories of the Federal-State Marketing Improvement Program or with payments in lieu of taxes.

== See also ==
- Oregon and California Railroad Revested Lands
