= Western Oregon Railroad =

- The line of the Western Oregon Railroad between St. Joseph and Corvallis.

Overview
- Dates of operation: 1879–1880
- Successor: Oregon and California Railroad

Technical
- Track gauge: 1,435 mm (4 ft 8 1/2 in)
- Length: 49.7 miles (80.0 km)

The Western Oregon Railroad was a railway company in the state of Oregon in the United States. It was established by the bondholders of the Oregon and California Railroad to further extend the route of the "West Side" Oregon Central Railroad south toward Corvallis, Oregon. All three companies were consolidated in 1880. The Western Oregon's line between St. Joseph and Corvallis is intact and operated by the Portland and Western Railroad.

== History ==
The "West Side" Oregon Central Railroad had completed a 46-mile (74 km) line from Portland to St. Joseph, north of McMinnville, in 1872. The Western Oregon Railroad was incorporated on January 27, 1879, to extend the line further south. The line opened between St. Joseph and Corvallis on September 1, 1879. On that date, the Western Oregon leased the Oregon Central Railroad. Both companies were backed by the owners of the Oregon and California Railroad.

The Western Oregon Railroad and Oregon Central Railroad were consolidated with the Oregon and California Railroad on October 9, 1880. The Oregon and California remained part of the Southern Pacific Transportation Company system until 1927 when it was formally merged. The Western Oregon's line, along with the Oregon Central's, was known as the West Side branch. As of 2024 the line is owned by the Union Pacific Railroad and operated by the Portland and Western Railroad.
