= Alvadore, Oregon =

Unincorporated community in the state of Oregon, United States

- Unincorporated community
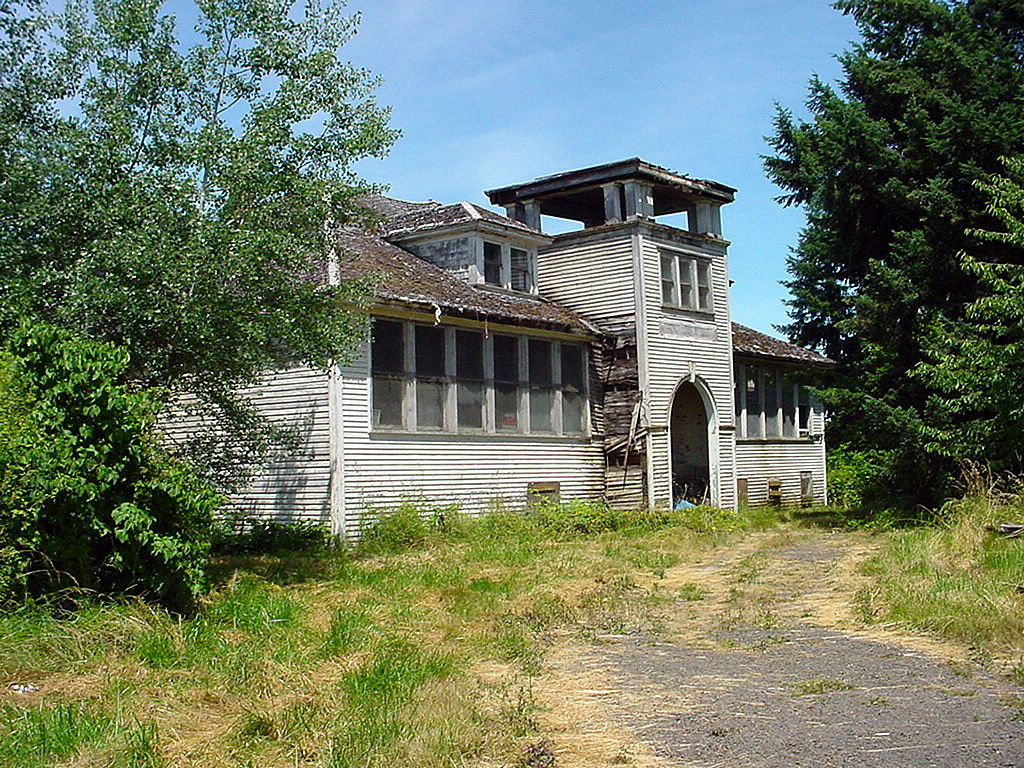
- Alvadore's abandoned schoolhouse

- Location within Oregon Location within the United States
- Coordinates: 44°07′36″N 123°15′52″W
- Country: United States
- State: Oregon
- County: Lane
- Elevation: 384 ft (117 m)
- Time zone: UTC-8 (Pacific (PST))
  - Summer (DST): UTC-7 (PDT)
- ZIP codes: 97409 (PO Boxes)
- GNIS feature ID: 1136001

Alvadore is an unincorporated community in Lane County, Oregon, United States, located nine miles northwest of downtown Eugene and one mile northeast of Fern Ridge Reservoir.

== History ==
Alvadore was named for Alvadore Welch of Portland, who built the Portland, Eugene and Eastern Railway through the community. The railway was later acquired by the Southern Pacific Railroad, but in 1936 the track was torn up. Alvadore post office was established in 1914.

At one time Alvadore had a school.

== Climate ==
This region experiences warm (but not hot) and dry summers, with no average monthly temperatures above 71.6 °F (22.0 °C). According to the Köppen Climate Classification system, Alvadore has a warm-summer Mediterranean climate, abbreviated "Csb" on climate maps.
