= Riparian forest =

Forested or wooded area of land adjacent to a body of water

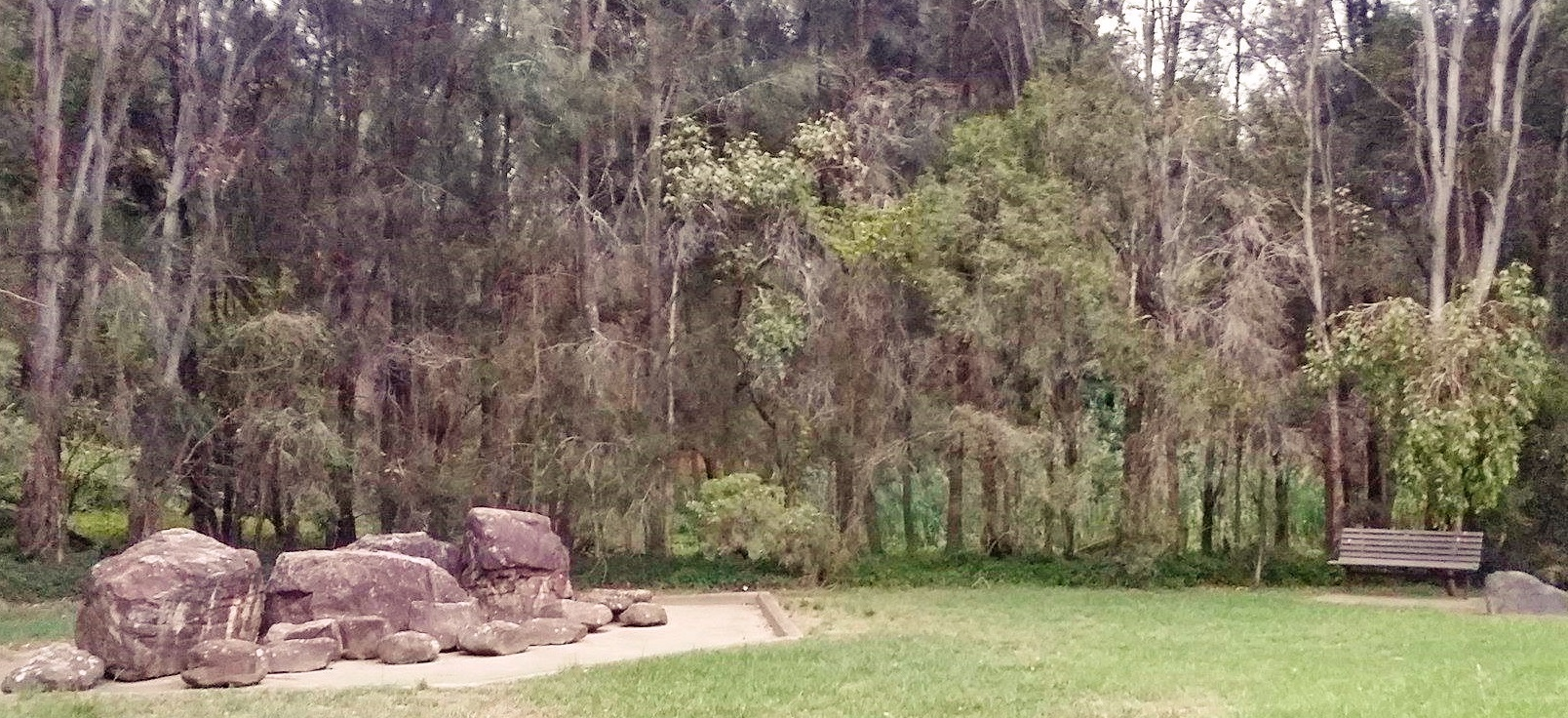
A she-oak riparian forest in Western Sydney

A riparian forest or riparian woodland is a forested or wooded area of land adjacent to a body of water such as a river, stream, pond, lake, marshland, estuary, canal, sink, or reservoir. Due to the broad nature of the definition, riparian woodlands have a huge diversity of characteristics including but not limited to soil composition, microclimates, and vegetative structures. However, among the varied range and landscapes, one factor stays constant: a high rate of primary productivity. This makes riparian forests hugely important centers of nutrient recycling.

== Etymology ==
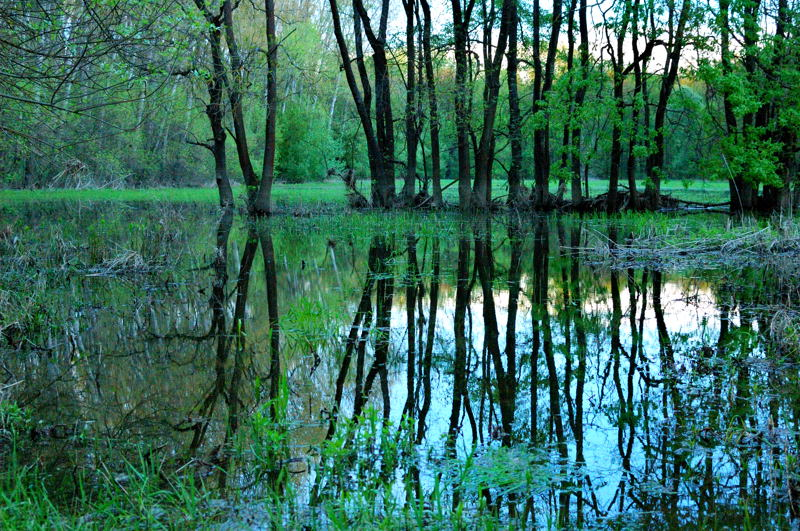
Riparian forest in Záhorie Protected Landscape Area in Slovakia

The term riparian comes from the Latin word ripa, 'river bank'; technically it refers only to areas adjacent to flowing bodies of water such as rivers, streams, sloughs and estuaries. However, the terms riparian forest and riparian zone have come to include areas adjacent to non-flowing bodies of water such as ponds, lakes, playas and reservoirs.

== Characteristics ==
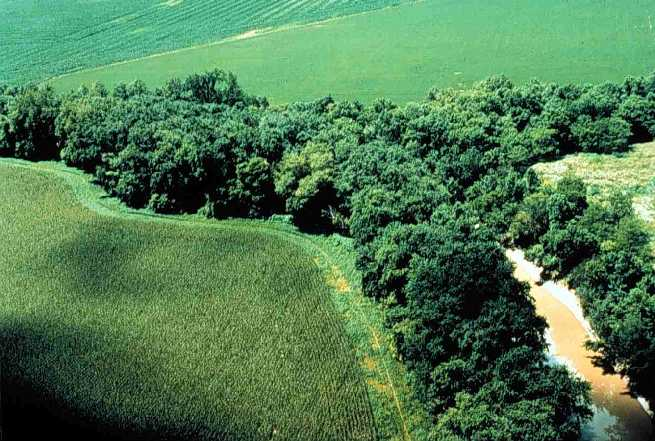
A riparian forest area along a tributary to Lake Erie

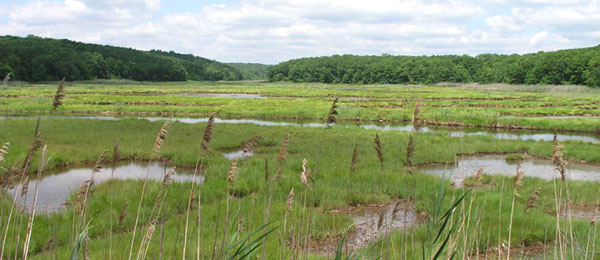
Atlantic coastal salt marsh

Riparian forests are subject to frequent inundation.

Riparian forests help control sediment, reduce the damaging effects of flooding, and aid in stabilizing stream banks.

Riparian zones are transition zones between an upland terrestrial environment and an aquatic environment. Organisms found in this zone are adapted to periodic flooding. Many not only tolerate it, but require it in order to maintain health and complete their lifestyles.

Invertebrate communities rely on riparian forests due to their unique characteristics. The constant process of flooding and drought allow for insect communities to flourish since alluvial depositions of nutrients and vital food sources like leaf litter due to their high rate of productivity. These aspects of Riparian forests make them hugely important in the life cycles of invertebrates like insects throughout the world. Decomposers, like the Lepidostoma unicolor, Which can be found in northwestern North America, rely on these external nutritional subsidies for food sources. Many decomposers are in their larval stage when they are in the streams or rivers along riparian forests.

== Threats ==
Threats to riparian forests:

- Cleared for agricultural use because of the good soil quality
- Historically, trees used as wood fuel for steamships, steam locomotives, etc.
- Urban development (housing, roads, malls, etc.)
- Grazing
- Mining
- Disrupted hydrology, such as dams and levees, which reduces the amount and/or frequency of flooding
- Invasive species

== See also ==
- Bosque – Type of forest found along rivers in the Southwest United States
- Gallery forest – Type of riparian forest in dry regions
- Management of Pacific Northwest riparian forests
- Riparian zone – Interface between land and a river or stream
- Tugay – Riparian gallery forest habitats in central Asia
- Swamp Oak Forests – Riparian forests in Australia
