= Chamberlain–Ferris Act =

United States federal legislation

The Chamberlain–Ferris Act (39 Stat. 218) of June 9, 1916 was an Act of the United States Congress that ruled that 2,800,000 acres (11,000 km^{2}) of the original 4,000,000 acres (16,000 km^{2}) granted to the Southern Pacific Company (successor to the Oregon and California Railroad) in California and Oregon were revested to the United States, and put under the control of the United States General Land Office, which was to dispose of the lands and timber through auction sales. The lands were named the Oregon and California Railroad Revested Lands (better known as the O&C Lands).

The bill was sponsored by Senator George E. Chamberlain of Oregon and Representative Scott Ferris of Oklahoma, both Democrats.

The results proved disappointing, and the act was repealed by the subsequent Oregon and California Revested Lands Sustained Yield Management Act of 1937 (43 U.S.C. § 1181f) of August 28, 1937, which authorized the Secretary of the Interior to establish sustained yield units on the land, 2,700,000 acres (11,000 km^{2}) of which was still unsold. This act established the O&C administration to manage the lands.

As of 2006, 2 million acres (8,100 km^{2}) of the revested lands are managed by the Bureau of Land Management and 500,000 acres (2,000 km^{2}) are managed by the United States Forest Service.

== See also ==
- Oregon land fraud scandal
- 64th United States Congress (1915–17)
- 74th United States Congress (1935–37)
