= Management of Pacific Northwest riparian forests =

Management of Pacific Northwest riparian forests is necessary because many of these forests have been dramatically changed from their original makeup. The primary interest in riparian forest and aquatic ecosystems under the Northwest Forest Plan (NWFP) is the need to restore stream habitat for fish populations, particularly anadromous salmonids. Some of these forests have been grazed by cattle or other livestock. The heavy hooves of these animals compact the soil. This compaction does not allow the water to be absorbed into the ground, so the water runs off into the stream carrying topsoil along the way.

The simplification of the stream itself has also had negative effects. The large woody debris in the streams has been removed to allow for easy access to the stream and for better travel in the streams themselves. But the faster moving current erodes the stream banks, filling the stream with more sediment. The removal of trees on the stream banks also leads to erosion and stream degradation. Another effect of the removal of trees is an increase in stream temperatures because of the lack of shade. These changes to riparian forests can be fixed through three steps;

1. Creation of riparian reserves
2. Restoration of channel complexity
3. Silviculture practices

These steps will help restore riparian forest ecosystems which will directly help the salmon populations.

== Riparian forest restoration ==
The following steps used to help restore and maintain healthy riparian forests came from the Bureau of Land Management’s best management practices (BMPs) in the Roseburg District. The first step towards riparian forest restoration should be the establishment of riparian reserves. The second step is to restore channel complexity. The third step is to apply silvicultural treatments to restore large conifers. The large conifer species would be western red cedar Thuja plicata and western hemlock Tsuga heterophylla. These three steps will help direct the ecosystem back to its pre-disturbed state.

== Riparian reserves ==
The riparian reserve is the designated width from the stream where restrictions on what can be done are placed in order to protect the functions of the land and water in that reserved area. There are three different riparian reserve widths:

1. Fish bearing stream widths are 300 feet (91 m) on each side of the stream.
2. Permanently flowing non-fish bearing stream widths are 150 feet (46 m).
3. Seasonally following or intermittent stream widths are 100 feet (30 m).

Some activities that are restricted or limited in the riparian reserve include:

1. Cattle grazing.
2. Mineral lease operations.
3. Chemical loading operations or similar toxic activities.
4. Disturbance of unstable banks and headwalls.
5. Operation of tracked equipment on slopes greater than 30%
6. Chemical applications
7. Timber harvest or fuel wood cutting ( except for salvage operations & management of stands)
8. Road construction.

== Channel complexity restoration ==
The placement of large woody debris (LWD) in streams creates pools and side channels. The pools provide habitat for aquatic organisms while the side channels help alleviate flooding. The LWD also controls the routing of sedimentation. The source of the LWD should be outside of the riparian reserve whenever possible so as not to promote erosion in the riparian reserve. However, if usable trees are generated during management, then they can be used to add LWD. Any trees that naturally fall in the stream are an advantage and should be left.

== Silviculture techniques ==
There are three silvicultural techniques that will help restore large conifers (western red cedar & western hemlock) in riparian forests. Since silviculture is a cyclical process, the numbering of the techniques doesn't denote the order in which these operations should begin or the importance of the step.

1. Site preparation
2. Seeding
3. Single tree selection

=== Site preparation ===
The role of site preparation is to modify current growing vegetative conditions making the site suitable for the desired seedlings. Western red cedar and western hemlock are the desired seedlings. The goals of site preparation in this case are:

1. Control competing ground vegetation
2. Erosion control
3. Nutrient balancing
4. Promote decomposition of surface litter layer
5. Expose mineral soil.

Mechanical site preparation will be difficult Because of the heavy equipment's size, and inability to maneuver in the small spaces left by single tree selection. Prescribed burning is another method of site preparation, but will not work because the shallow roots of western hemlock would get damaged, hurting the seed sources. Prescribed burning would also damage the thin bark of both western hemlock and red cedar girdling the trees. Chemical applications are restricted in the riparian reserves because of the danger of runoff or leaching of chemicals into the stream. So the methods that will be used for site preparation are:

1. Passive site preparation
2. Manual site preparation.

The passive site preparation will entail keeping the debris created by naturally falling trees where they land. Keeping the slash and smaller trees that are generated by tree selections on the ground is another passive site preparation that will work well within the riparian forest. This will supply a good rotting seed bed for both Western Redcedar and Western Hemlock. Both species also can use disturbed mineral seed beds for regeneration from seed. To obtain disturbed mineral soil in the small areas that single tree selection creates manually turning up the soil with hand tools or small tillers is the manual site preparation option.

=== Seeding ===
Seeding is done following site preparation. Seeding is one way to ensure the survival of the desired species on a site. With seeding, foresters have control of genetic makeup of the species and the source of the seed. Natural regeneration may be obtained because of the high numbers of annual seed crops (100,000–1 million/acre). Where annual seed production is low western red cedar can be direct seeded in the fall if the soil moisture is adequate. High numbers of seeds will be needed to reach the desired stocking level. Containerized stocking also works well. In the coastal ranges, 2-year-old bare-root stock seems to be most efficient. Containerized stock plantings in the spring perform better than bare-root stock in the interior. Western hemlock has a good rate of survival in a wide range of conditions. This will allow for natural regeneration on sites that have good organic or mineral soil. If the site is not suitable for natural regeneration then the use of container-grown stock should be used. Hemlock doesn't survive well with the bare-root stock method. Both western red cedar and western hemlock are able to reproduce by some form of vegetative reproduction. Western red cedar reproduces in three ways of vegetative form; layering, rooting of fallen branches, and branch development on fallen trees. In some areas of the Cascades, this form of regeneration is the most successful. Another option for the establishment of red cedar is the use of stem cuttings. Western hemlock also has vegetative reproduction capabilities. Hemlock can be propagated by layering and from cuttings.

=== Single-tree selection ===
Single-tree selection harvest method works best within the riparian ecosystem. Single-tree selection is a good method to keep the western hemlock and western red cedar on the site. If the stand was left alone and the forest naturally created gaps for succession then other species that are less tolerant than the desired tree species of western red cedar and western hemlock could overtake the created gaps. Single-tree selection will contribute minimally to erosion, still provide habitat for wildlife, be aesthetically pleasing to the eye, and follow the best management practices (BMPs) that are associated with riparian forests. Single-tree selection gives the forest a great vertical distribution of foliage. The last reason for doing a single tree selection is that it spreads out income over longer period of time. This could help pay for any costs associated with the stand's management. Single-tree selection replicates the natural process called gap-phase. Gap-phase is an event that happens in a forest when a tree in the upper canopy of the forest falls down, usually form a strong wind. The gap formed in the upper canopy allows enough sunlight to come through the opening and reach saplings at the forest floor. These saplings can grow and eventually penetrate the canopy. The natural gap-phase process may only open the total stand by 1 percent. Single tee selection is different from the natural process because the openings are created more often. Since both species are tolerant an opening of the stand by 10 percent each cutting cycle would be enough for a stand to do well. An uneven-aged forest is a result of periodically opening the canopy.

Since both Western Hemlock and Western Redcedar are shade tolerant species, a basal area of 180 sq ft (17 m^{2}) is recommended and would be the maximum basal area the stand could support. The q-factor for these species is 1.2 because of their tolerance. So the number of trees in the 24-inch (610 mm) size class would be 7 trees. A cutting cycle of 20 years is recommended to ensure the stand is following the ideal stocking curve for western red cedar and western hemlock.

Western Redcedar can tolerate mixed-species conditions in the understory and is often overtopped by species such as Douglas-fir, Western White Pine and Western Hemlock (Minore, 1990). Western Hemlock responds well to release after long periods of suppression. After 50 to 60 years, the advanced regeneration will grow vigorously after overstory removal (Packee, 1990). The single-tree selection works well with these growth characteristics of both species.

== See also ==
- Riparian zone
- Riparian-zone restoration
- Fir and spruce forests
