= Franklin, Oregon =

Unincorporated community in the state of Oregon, United States

- Unincorporated community
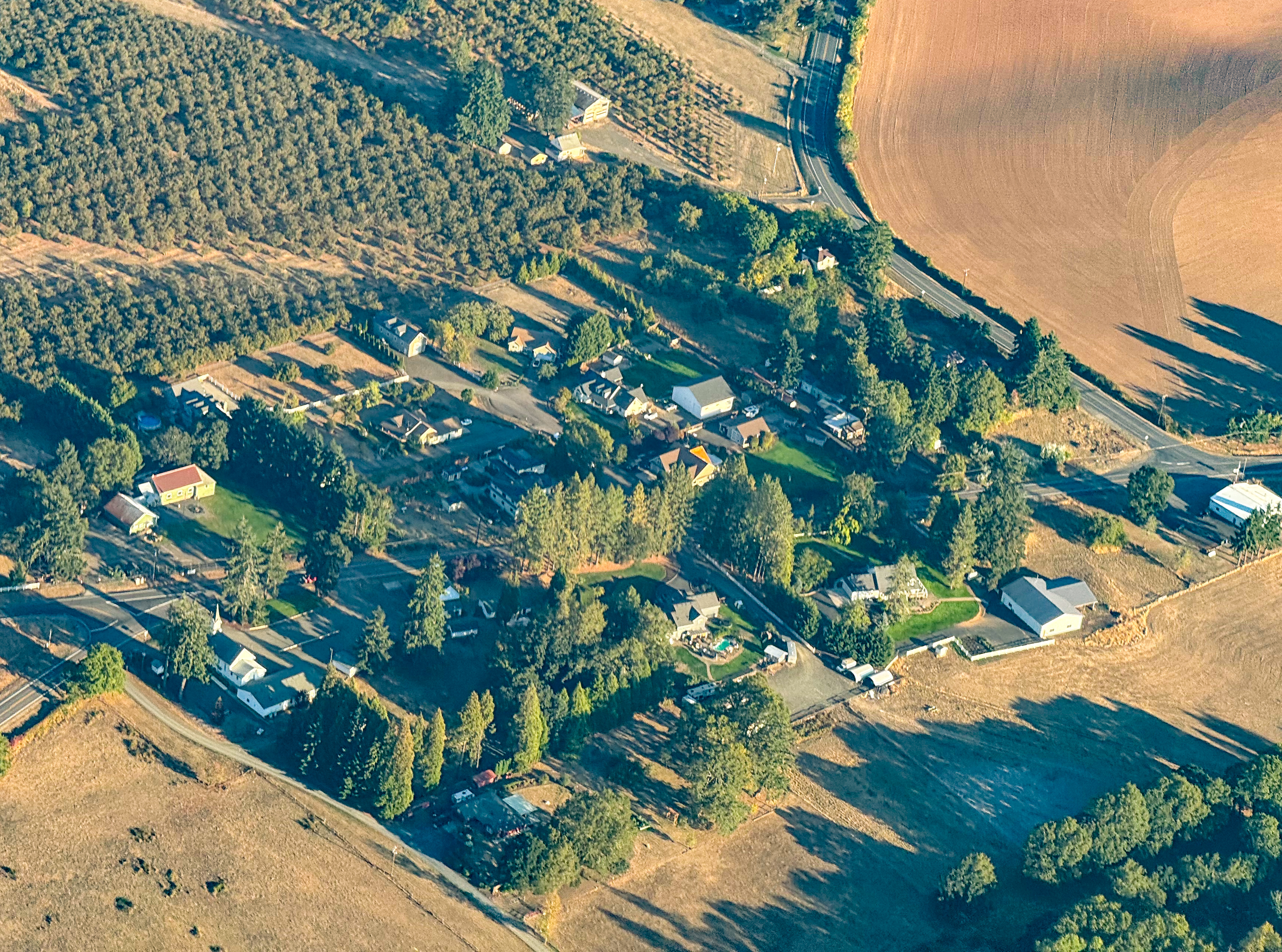
- Franklin aerial photo, 2025

- Location within the state of Oregon Franklin, Oregon (the United States)
- Coordinates: 44°09′39″N 123°18′16″W
- Country: United States
- State: Oregon
- County: Lane
- Established: 1855
- Founded by: Daniel Smith
- Time zone: UTC-8 (Pacific (PST))
  - Summer (DST): UTC-7 (PDT)
- Zip code: 97448

Franklin is an unincorporated community in Lane County, Oregon, United States. Due to a naming controversy, it was also known as Smithfield and Franklin-Smithfield.

== Geography ==
Franklin is located about three miles south of Cheshire, at the intersection of the historic Applegate Trail and the Old Territorial Highway. It is in the drainage basin of the Long Tom River.

== History ==
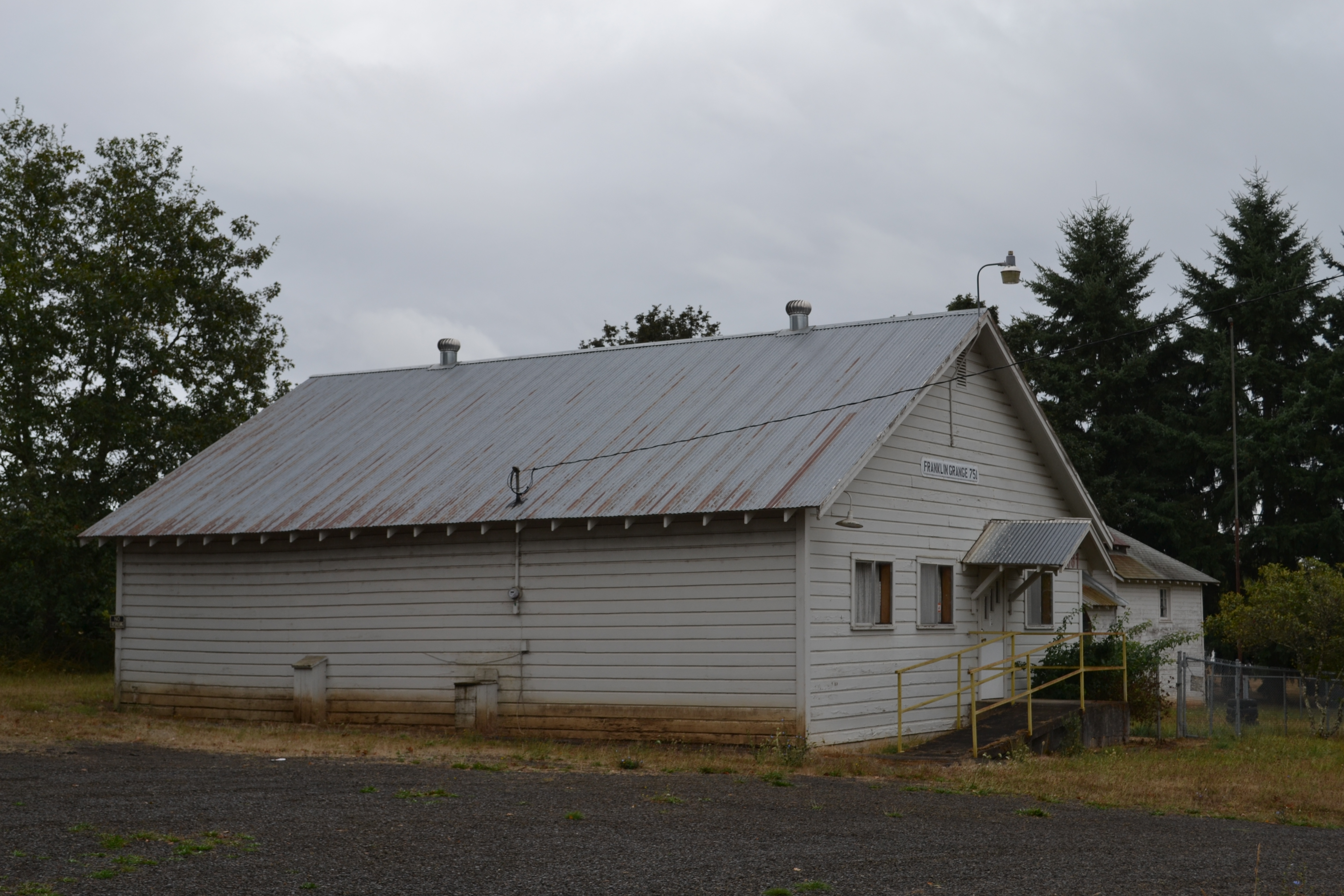
Franklin Grange hall, 2011

Daniel Smith settled on a Donation Land Claim here in 1852. A post office named Franklin was established in 1855, with Enos Ellmaker as the first postmaster. It was named for Franklin, Missouri. Royal Varney Howard, an Oregon Trail pioneer of 1853, opened a store in 1857, where he began referring to the settlement as Smithfield in honor of Daniel Smith. A Smithfield post office operated from March to December 1859. Smith laid out a plat for the community of Smithfield in 1891. The post office named Franklin also continued, but closed in 1892. Some sources state that the Franklin post office was not renamed Smithfield because of the existence of another Smithfield in Polk County, although the two offices did not operate concurrently. Franklin Cemetery (aka Franklin Grange Cemetery) was established in 1891; Daniel Smith is buried there. One church (now Bethany Church of Franklin) was built in 1897, and the Franklin Christian Church dates to 1899. Daniel Smith sold the Christian Church congregation the property.

In 1915, the population of Franklin was 75. It was noted that Franklin was about 1.5 miles from Georgetown station on the Portland, Eugene & Eastern Railway. The station was located where Franklin Road intersected with the railway. The tracks have since been removed. Agricultural activities in 1915 included farming, dairying, and poultry raising, with the area being particularly suited for berries and other fruit crops. There was a public school, and the church denominations at that time were Christian and Methodist Episcopal. The Grange building, which still exists, was owned by the Modern Woodmen of America. In 1916, two stores in Franklin burned down: a hardware store owned by Bryan and Richardson, and a general merchandise store owned by R. S. Moseley.

As of 1990, a former school building and Grange hall, which had been moved to Franklin in 1914, served as the Franklin store. The store stood across the highway from the present fire station but had been demolished by 2019. It was seen as "Quidaciolu's Market" in the 1986 film Stand By Me. In 1990, the community still had two churches and a Grange. Franklin Grange has since been converted into an events venue. As of 2025, the two churches were the Franklin Christian Church and Bethany Church of Franklin. The Franklin station of the Lane Rural Fire Authority is located at the intersection of Territorial Highway and Franklin Road.

=== 1862 Confederate flag incident ===
During the American Civil War, in 1862, local residents, many of whom were originally from Kentucky and other Southern states, created a Confederate flag that was raised in front of the store. The store served as a stagecoach stop along the Territorial road, so the flag was visible to dozens of travelers every week. In August 1862, a detachment of several hundred U.S. Cavalry soldiers from the Vancouver Barracks were sent to confiscate the flag.

=== 1930s historic marker controversy ===
South of the crossroads are two historical markers commemorating Daniel Smith, which have survived a decades-long feud between the Smith family and others who lived in the community. Two markers were placed before the existing ones. The first marker was placed on July 27, 1930, by the Lewis and Clark Chapter of the Daughters of the American Revolution (DAR). It read, "Pioneer home of Daniel Smith, 1852, for whom Smithfield was named and also the Westside Old Territorial Road, 1848-1965." A stone marker was erected within three years by the DAR that read, "By the ruling of the court, this is and has been Smithfield since 1857. Dedicated Smithfield 1862 in honor of Daniel Smith, pioneer of 1852, Donor of the village site." The stone marker was destroyed (possibly dynamited), and the earlier marker vanished. A bronze marker mounted on a concrete base, placed by the DAR in 1950, remains in the area. There is also another marker dated 1933 without the controversial wording that still exists. In 1934, the county placed road signs with both "Franklin" and "Smithfield", and topographic maps labeled the place "Franklin-Smithfield". By 1966, maps only referred to Franklin.

== Smithfield in Polk County ==
Smithfield was a former railroad station on the Oregonian Railway about five miles northeast of Dallas, Oregon. A post office named Smithfield was established in 1893 and closed about 1900. The line was later absorbed by the Southern Pacific Railroad, though the tracks have since been removed. The community had a public school.
