= Southern Pacific Red Electric Lines =

Former interurban railway system in Oregon

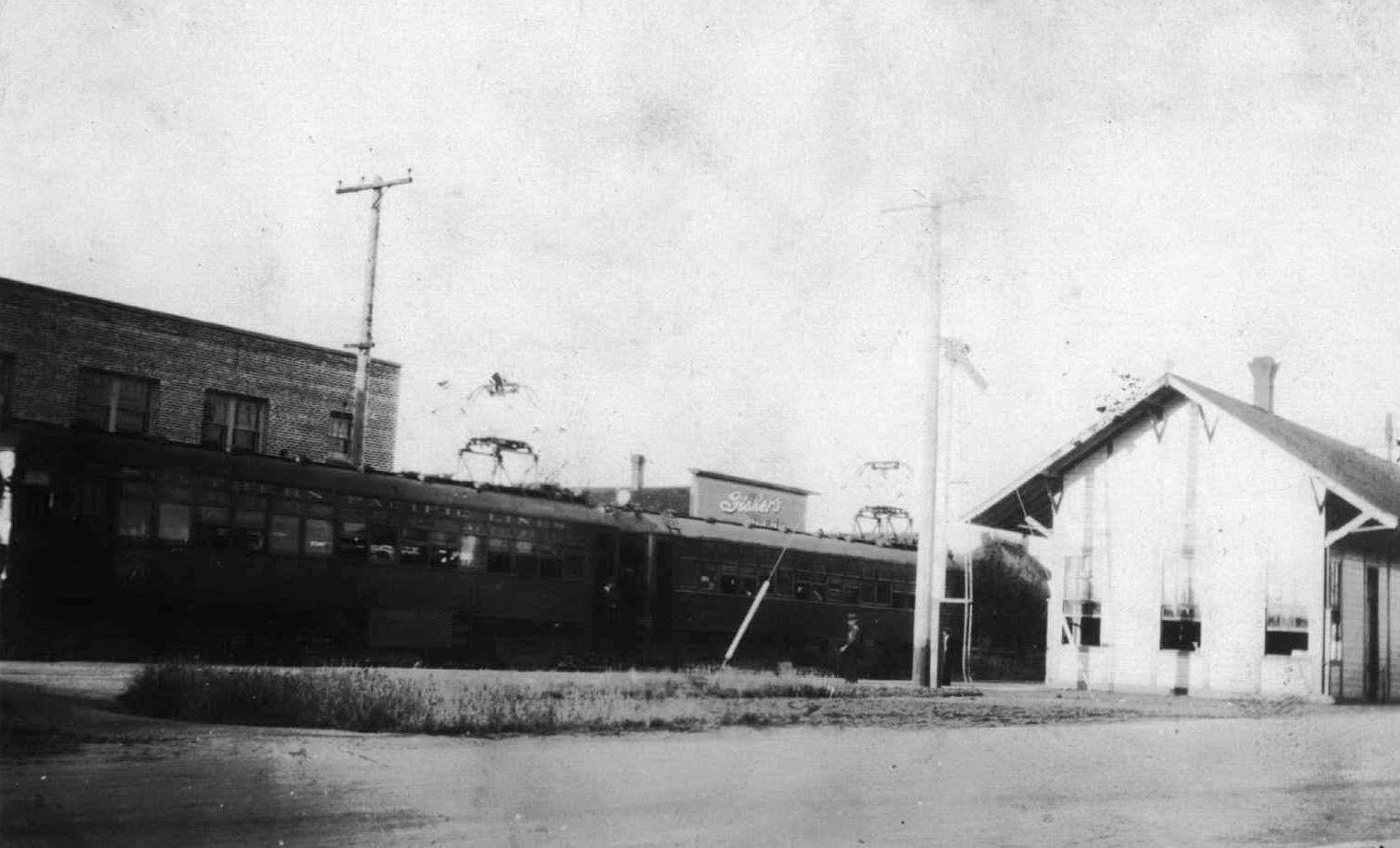
- A Red Electric train at Southern Pacific Depot in Beaverton

Overview
- Service type: Interurban passenger
- Locale: Oregon
- First service: January 17, 1914
- Last service: October 5, 1929
- Former operator(s): Southern Pacific Company; operated as Portland, Eugene and Eastern Railway 1914–15 only

Technical
- Track gauge: 1,435 mm (4 ft 8 1/2 in) standard gauge
- Electrification: Overhead line, 1,500 V DC
- Track owner(s): Southern Pacific Company

The Southern Pacific Red Electric Lines, also known simply as the Red Electric, was a network of interurban passenger train services operated by the Southern Pacific Railroad in the Willamette Valley of the U.S. state of Oregon from 1914 to 1929. The service got its name from the bright red color of its cars. (Note: The Oregon Electric was sometimes called the "Green Electric" in reference to the color of its cars and in contrast to the Red Electric.) Despite its short history, among West Coast interurbans it was unique, and it was considered the finest such system in the Pacific Northwest. It was the only major electric interurban railroad converted from steam to electric passenger use. It was also one of few systems using all-steel equipment, and one of the largest 1500-volt systems in the country.

== History ==
The Oregon Electric Railway completed an interurban line from Portland to Eugene in 1912, as well as several branch lines to agricultural, business, and population centers in the Willamette Valley. The Southern Pacific (SP), feeling threatened by this competition, researched the feasibility of electrifying most of its Willamette Valley trackage. At the time, electric traction was seen as the way of the future, and in 1912, SP began converting existing steam routes to overhead electrification. Via the Red Electric system, which SP established on rail lines it acquired from the Portland, Eugene and Eastern Railway (PE&E), the company planned to electrify all of its Oregon trackage except for its main line through the valley from Portland to California. The projected growth of the rural areas outside the main population centers of Portland, Salem, Corvallis, Albany and Eugene, however, did not materialize, despite the efforts of real estate promoters. The combination of this lack of growth, World War I and the rise of the automobile meant that the Red Electric system was far smaller than originally intended. The final Red Electric run took place on October 5, 1929.

== Construction ==
Southern Pacific acquired the Portland, Eugene and Eastern in 1912. The PE&E was developed by Alvadore Welch, who owned the streetcar system in Salem, the streetcar connecting Eugene with Springfield, and the Corvallis and Alsea River Railway, a steam line that was being developed from Corvallis to Monroe. Southern Pacific added its Westside and Yamhill branches between Portland and Corvallis to the PE&E, as well as acquiring and adding the Sheridan and Willamina Railroad and the Willamette Falls Railway. SP began electrifying the PE&E steam lines soon after acquiring them. Interurban service began operation on January 17, 1914, under the Portland, Eugene and Eastern name, but SP replaced references to PE&E with "Southern Pacific Lines" in 1915. The service soon became known as the SP Red Electric. Initial service extended from Portland to Whiteson (south of McMinnville), but eventually reached Corvallis, in 1917.

Southern Pacific proposed several new lines or the electrification of existing lines within its system, but most of these were never built or converted. Instead, the company concentrated on upgrading and electrifying its existing steam lines between Portland and McMinnville.

== Routes ==
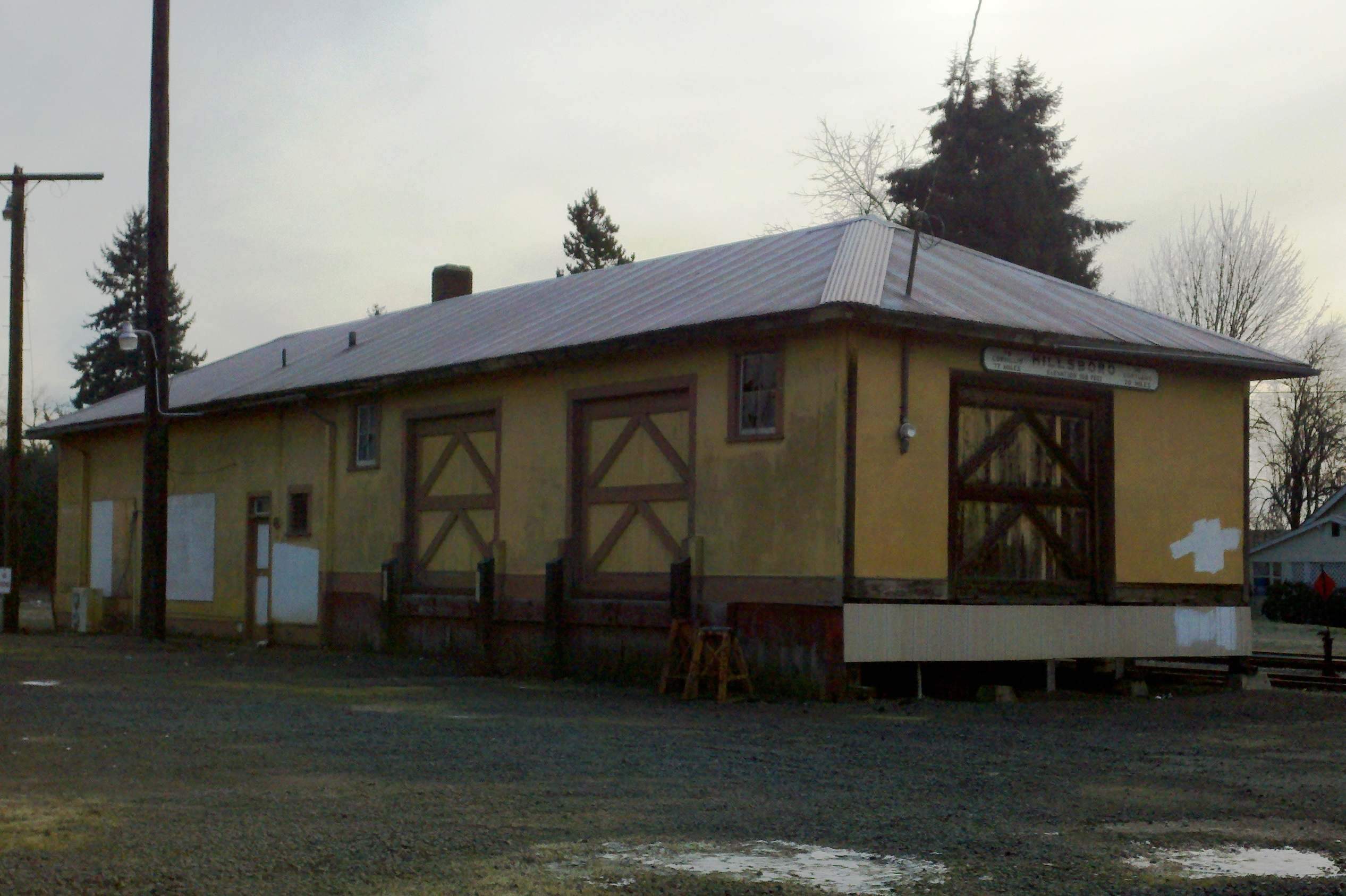
Former Hillsboro depot that still includes sign indicating distance to Corvallis at end of the line

Trains originated at Union Station in Portland. The "Westside" route connected Beaverton, Hillsboro, Forest Grove and Carlton. The "Eastside" line served Oswego, Sherwood, Newberg and Lafayette. The two routes connected in Saint Joseph, just north of McMinnville, and continued to Corvallis as a single line. Service to Corvallis was inaugurated on June 17, 1917.

The main Portland–Corvallis line was 88 miles (142 km) long, and the entire Red Electric network encompassed 180 miles (290 km) of track, served by 64 trains per day. In 1920, the schedule had four daily trains through from Portland to Corvallis in each direction and two more that ran as far as Whiteson. Closer to Portland, Red Electric service was much more frequent.

Service on the Westside line ran for the last time on July 28, 1929, thereby ending all SP interurban service to Beaverton, Hillsboro, and Forest Grove, among other places situated along only that SP line, some of which continued to be served by interurbans of the Oregon Electric Railway for another three years. The remaining Red Electric service ended only a little more than two months later, on October 5, 1929, with the final runs on the Eastside line.

== Wreck ==
The worst train accident in the history of Oregon interurban railways occurred east of the depot at Bertha (now within the Hillsdale neighborhood) on May 9, 1920. Two trains collided head-on, killing the engineer of one train instantly. Two other employees and five passengers were also killed, and ten employees and 92 passengers were injured. One of the injured passengers later died. It was hard for rescuers to quickly reach what was at the time a remote location.

== Remnants ==
The Red Electric substation in Lake Oswego was later converted into apartments that are still in use today. The Forest Grove depot was purchased by a grass seed broker in 1948 and still exists today. The McMinnville Red Electric depot, similar in structure to the Forest Grove depot, is still in operation, as is the Hillsboro depot. They are the only two original depots that still exist on the old Red Electric route. As of 1994, the former substation in Dundee was being used as a garage. The abandoned substation in McCoy, built in 1916, still exists.

Between Portland and Oswego (now called Lake Oswego), most of the track of the Red Electric's "East Side" line remained in use by SP freight trains until 1983, and since 1987 has been used by the Willamette Shore Trolley heritage streetcar service. SP sold that approximately 7-mile (11 km) section of rail line in 1988 to a consortium of local governments who wanted to preserve it for possible future rail transit use.

Parts of the former Red Electric alignment in southwest Portland are being studied for use as a trail connecting existing bike and pedestrian trails within Portland Parks & Recreation's trail system.

== See also ==
- Pacific Electric Railway – SP's subsidiary in Southern California widely known as the "Red Car" system
- East Bay Electric Lines – SP's subsidiary in Northern California running electric trains in the San Francisco Bay
