= Federal-State Marketing Improvement Program =

United States Department of Agriculture program

The Federal-State Marketing Improvement Program (FSMIP), sometimes referred to in budget documents as Payments to States and Territories, is a United States Department of Agriculture (USDA) program provides matching funds to states for research and innovative projects aimed at identifying new market opportunities for producers or at improving the efficiency of agricultural marketing systems. The program is administered by the Agricultural Marketing Service and recently has been funded at just over $1 million annually.
