= Owyhee, Idaho =

Unincorporated community in the Ada County, Idaho, United States

- Unincorporated community
- Location within Idaho Location within the United States
- Coordinates: 45°25′06″N 116°12′02″W
- Country: United States
- State: Idaho
- County: Canyon
- Elevation: 2,969 ft (905 m)
- Time zone: UTC-7 (Mountain (MST))
  - Summer (DST): UTC-6 (MDT)
- ZIP Code: 83627
- Area codes: 208, 986
- GNIS feature ID: 396998

Owyhee is an unincorporated community in Ada County, Idaho, United States, roughly 14 miles (23 km) south of Boise. Owyhee had a post office 1883–1919.
