= Saint Joseph, Oregon =

Unincorporated community in the state of Oregon, United States

Coordinates: 45.238172°N 123.144827°W

- Unincorporated community
- Nickname: St. Joe
- Interactive map of Saint Joseph, Oregon
- Location within Oregon Location within the United States
- Country: United States
- State: Oregon
- Counties: Yamhill
- Named for: St. Joseph, Missouri
- Postal code: 97128
- Area code: 503

Saint Joseph is an unincorporated community in Yamhill County, Oregon, United States. It is located about two miles (3.2 km) west of Lafayette near Oregon Route 99W. The area is sometimes known as "St. Joe". The area is in the Portland metropolitan area.

== Early history ==
Saint Joseph was named by Ben Holladay, who chose this location as the terminus of the westside line of his Oregon Central Railroad, in order to encourage competition between Lafayette and McMinnville. There have been said to have been two different origins of the name of the area. Some sources state that he likely named the station after Saint Joseph, Missouri, although another source says it was named to honor Holladay's brother Joseph. Saint Joseph post office operated from 1872 until 1878.

Holladay had planned to extend the railway south of Saint Joseph down the Willamette Valley, but he ran out of money. Turntables were used to return the train to Portland. Saint Joseph was platted with 74 blocks that each contained ten lots, and at one time the town had 150 houses. There was a two-story hotel, and stagecoaches from McMinnville, Dayton, and Lafayette would meet the train, which brought passengers from the East Coast looking to buy acreage in the area from two companies that were formed to sell land there c. 1900. Henry Villard extended the railroad line from Saint Joseph south to Corvallis in 1878, and McMinnville became the more important railroad terminal.

== Railroads ==
Later, the eastside and westside lines of the Southern Pacific's Red Electric interurban train met in Saint Joseph, Southern Pacific having gained control of the former Oregon Central tracks in 1887. The westside line ran on the original Oregon Central tracks, while the eastside line ran on a connection that was extended from Saint Joseph to Lafayette in 1906, forming a wye that allowed trains to travel in three directions: north to Carlton and Forest Grove, northeast through Lafayette to Newberg, or southwest to McMinnville and eventually Corvallis. The Red Electric began service in 1914 was discontinued in 1929, at which time the lines began to be used for freight service.

By the late 1970s, Southern Pacific (SP) was rarely using the westside line, now known as the St. Joseph Branch, from Saint Joseph north to Seghers, because traffic was mostly serving the Stimson Lumber Company sawmill and a few grain silos in and around Carlton. By 1980, SP was only storing cars on the line south of the junction to the sawmill, and by 1985, it had abandoned and torn up a long section of track from the mill junction to just north of Carlton. The tracks north out of Saint Joseph extended almost five miles (8 km) and ended about one mile (1.6 km) north of Carlton in order to serve the remaining Carlton customers. By the early 1990s, the line was cut back to about 1.5 miles (2.4 km) and today, this portion is used by the Portland and Western Railroad (PNWR) exclusively to store cars. The Southern Pacific lines were leased by the Portland and Western in the early 1990s and PNWR continues to run trains from Newberg through Saint Joseph to Corvallis.

== Great Depression ==
During President Franklin Roosevelt's administration, a Works Progress Administration (WPA) project had the federal government buying acreage in the Saint Joseph area for resettlement purposes. Most of the 1,500 acres (610 ha) were divided into small dairy farms on which WPA workers built houses, garages, and barns. The land sold for $100 an acre.

== Today ==
Despite the various attempts at promoting Saint Joseph's economy, little remains of the community, and it is considered a ghost town.
