= New Era, Oregon =

Unincorporated community in the state of Oregon, United States

- Unincorporated community
- Location within Oregon Location within the United States
- Coordinates: 45°18′02″N 122°39′32″W
- Country: United States
- State: Oregon
- County: Clackamas
- Elevation: 187 ft (57 m)
- Time zone: UTC-8 (Pacific (PST))
  - Summer (DST): UTC-7 (PDT)
- ZIP code: 97045
- Area codes: 503 and 971
- GNIS feature ID: 1136571

New Era is an unincorporated community in Clackamas County, Oregon, United States. Its post office opened in 1876 and closed in 1940.

== Climate ==
This region experiences warm (but not hot) and dry summers, with no average monthly temperatures above 71.6 °F. According to the Köppen Climate Classification system, New Era has a warm-summer Mediterranean climate, abbreviated "Csb" on climate maps.
