= Northwest Forest Plan =

United States federal policies

The Northwest Forest Plan (NWFP) is a series of federal policies and guidelines governing land use on federal lands in the Pacific Northwest region of the United States. It covers ten million hectares within Western Oregon and Washington, as well as a small part of Northern California.

== History ==
The NWFP was adopted in 1994 by the Clinton administration as the outcome of a series of studies and hearings that began in 1993; in response to over-harvesting of old growth forests, threatening northern spotted owl populations.

During the development of the NWFP, President Bill Clinton directed ten federal agencies responsible for forest management, fisheries, wildlife, tribal relations, and national parks to work with scientists on region-wide forest plans that would be "scientifically sound, ecologically credible, and legally responsible".

A multidisciplinary team of scientists known as the Forest Ecosystem Management Assessment Team was assigned the task of identifying management alternatives that would meet the requirements of applicable laws and regulations, including the Endangered Species Act, the National Forest Management Act, the Federal Land Policy Management Act, the Clean Water Act, and the National Environmental Policy Act.

== Goals ==
The plan provided for five major goals:

1. Never forget human and economic dimensions of the issues;
2. Protect the long-term health of forests, wildlife, and waterways;
3. Focus on scientifically sound, ecologically credible, and legally responsible strategies and implementation;
4. Produce a predictable and sustainable level of timber sales and nontimber resources; and
5. Ensure that federal agencies work together.

The NWFP was originally drafted with the intent of protecting critical habitat for the northern spotted owl, though the plan came to include much broader habitat protection goals. The plan is still in effect today and is intended to last for 100 years. Declining northern spotted owl populations led to the plan's implementation. The owl's main source of habitat is old growth forests which have become scarce the last few decades. Not only has over-harvesting of old growth forests led to declining northern spotted owl populations, but also competition from the barred owl, an invasive species originally native to the Eastern region of North America.

A small percentage of old growth forests still remain in parts of Washington and Oregon state. The plan has shifted emphasis from logging for economic gain to conservation and preservation of aquatic reserves including endangered fish stocks.

== Management ==
The federal lands falling under the purview of the NWFP are predominantly National Forests, but Bureau of Land Management lands, National Parks, National Wildlife Refuges, and military bases are also covered by the Plan. In addition, the US forest service holds a lot of the authority and management decision making processes within the plan area. The NWFP is highly controversial in that it called for strongly decreased timber yields within National Forests, Even though the Northwest Forest Plan is implemented to conserve late succession, it is also important that there is a process in the beginning to protect in the early succession of younger trees.

== See also ==
- Management of Pacific Northwest riparian forests
- Salvage Rider
