= Oregon Central Railroad =

Either of two railroad companies in Oregon

Map of both lines, and the eventual extension of the East Side Company as the Oregon and California Railroad

The Oregon Central Rail Road was the name of two railroad companies in the U.S. state of Oregon, each of which claimed federal land grants that had been assigned to the state in 1866 to assist in building a line from Portland south into California. The "East Side Company" of Salem (incorporated 1867), supported by businessman Ben Holladay, eventually received the grant for its line east of the Willamette River, and was reorganized in 1870 as the Oregon and California Railroad (O&C), which completed the line in 1887. Portland supported the competing "West Side Company" (incorporated 1866), which only built to McMinnville, and was sold to the O&C in 1880. The O&C was later acquired by the Southern Pacific Company, and mostly remains as part of the Union Pacific Railroad's I-5 Corridor; the West Side line is now operated by the Portland and Western Railroad between Beaverton and Forest Grove.

== History ==
Oregon Central Railroad
- West Side Company

Overview
- Dates of operation: 1866–1880
- Successor: Oregon and California Railroad

Technical
- Track gauge: 1,435 mm (4 ft 8 1/2 in)
- Length: 46.8 miles (75.3 km)

Oregon Central Rail Road
- East Side Company

Overview
- Dates of operation: 1867–1870
- Successor: Oregon and California Railroad

Technical
- Track gauge: 1,435 mm (4 ft 8 1/2 in)
- Length: 20.1 miles (32.3 km)

An early version of the Pacific Railway Act of 1862 included a branch north into Oregon, but this was left out of the law as passed. In its place, an 1866 law gave land grants to California and Oregon to convey to the California and Oregon Railroad of California and a company to be designated by the Oregon Legislature that would build the line. Led by Joseph P. Gaston, railroad promoters informally organized the Oregon Central Railroad (West Side Company) on October 6, and the legislature designated this company, which did not file incorporation papers until November 21, as the beneficiary of the federal grants four days later. The company adopted a line surveyed in 1864, which would begin at Portland (then entirely on the west side of the Willamette). In July 1865, Californians associated with the California and Oregon Railroad incorporated the first Oregon and California Railroad, but failed to acquire control of the West Side Company. Undaunted, they incorporated a second Oregon Central Rail Road (East Side Company) in April 1867, with Governor George L. Woods as president. The West Side Company broke ground in Portland on April 15, 1868, and the East Side Company followed suit the next day in East Portland.

A contest erupted between the two companies in the courts of public opinion and of law, each one claiming to be the recipient of the land grants. West Side construction was stopped when Portland's guarantee on bond interest was declared in violation of the city charter. Simon G. Elliott of California, promoter of the East Side Company, procured the assistance of businessman Ben Holladay, who in 1868 persuaded the state legislature to reassign the grant to that company, and Congress to extend the time for completion. The first 20 miles (32 km), from Portland to New Era, were completed by December 1869, thus enabling the East Side Company to receive its first pieces of land. The terminus of the East Side line was connected to Downtown Portland by ferry; first, with a boat operated by Holladay, and from about 1879 to 1889, with a new boat (later relocated to San Francisco Bay) built and operated by Henry Villard. The West Side Company obtained its own grant through an 1870 law that would give it land for a line from Portland to Astoria with a branch to McMinnville, but its owners sold the company to Holladay in 1870, and it only built about 47 miles (76 km) between Portland and Saint Joseph (near McMinnville), opening the line in November 1872.

In order to secure funds for the entire road to California, Holladay reorganized the East Side Company as the Oregon and California Railroad, which would go on to complete the line to Roseburg in December 1872, and to the state line in December 1887. By that time, the Oregon Short Line Railroad had been completed as a branch of the First transcontinental railroad to Oregon. The West Side Company operated its own road, under control of the O&C, until September 1879, when it was leased to the O&C-controlled Western Oregon Railroad, which had continued the line to Corvallis. Both companies were consolidated into the O&C in October 1880, and the Southern Pacific Company (SP) gained control in January 1887, and leased the O&C in July. Except south of Eugene, where the Natron Cutoff turned the old line into a secondary route that the SP sold to the Central Oregon and Pacific Railroad in December 1994, the Union Pacific Railroad (successor to the SP) still operates the East Side Company's line. The Portland and Western Railroad leased the remnants of the West Side Company's line in August 1995, and uses the stretch between Beaverton and Seghers (near Forest Grove) to reach the Stimson Lumber Company's sawmill.

== See also ==
- Oregon land fraud scandal, a later scandal relating to the Oregon Central's land grant
