= Secure Rural Schools and Community Self-Determination Act of 2000 =

- Long title: An Act to restore stability and predictability to the annual payments made to States and counties containing National Forest System lands and public domain lands managed by the Bureau of Land Management for use by the counties for the benefit of public schools, roads, and other purposes.
- Enacted by: the 106th United States Congress

Citations
- Public law: Pub. L. 106-393
- Statutes at Large: 114 Stat. 1607

Legislative history
- Introduced in the House as H.R. 2389 by Nathan Deal on June 30, 1999; Signed into law by President Bill Clinton on October 30, 2000

The Secure Rural Schools and Community Self-Determination Act of 2000 (Pub. L. 106–393 (text) (PDF)) was a bill passed into law by the United States Congress on October 30, 2000. The law amended the United States Forest Service's county payments program for FY2001-FY2006 to allow states or counties to choose to receive the average of the three highest payments for FY1986-FY1999 in lieu of the regular 25% payment, but requiring that 15–20% of those payments be used by the counties for specified purposes, in accordance with recommendations of resource advisory committees for projects on federal lands, or returned to the Treasury.

The Rural Schools Acts were designed to provide federal dollars to rural schools in places where much of the surrounding land base that is usually taxed with property taxes to fund schools instead has untaxed national forest land. In 1908, the federal government created the county payments program to provide 25% of the money the federal government received from logging on those forests to the counties to be spent on schools, roads, and other services. By the 1990's very little logging was still occurring, and thus this revenue stream for schools disappeared, motivating this legislation as a temporary fix.

The Forest Service county payments should not be confused with Bureau of Land Management "payments in lieu of taxes."

== Expiration and Reauthorization ==
The Act originally expired in 2006, but was renewed regularly by Congress, each time at reduced spending levels, until 2023.

The last year of payouts was 2024, which saw $232 million paid to over 700 counties, mostly in the West. The legislation was not renewed in 2024, leaving the affected counties with budget shortfalls.

In 2025, the One Big Beautiful Bill Act contained language that ordered proceeds from timber sales on federal lands to be directed to the federal government instead of the counties, creating a significant funding gap for affected counties and calling into question whether the Secure Rural Schools law was still in effect.

In December 2025, the Senate passed an extension of the Secure Rural Schools funding. Following receipt of letter from Democratic Senator Ron Wyden of Oregon and Republican Senator Mike Crapo of Idaho in December, the House approved the bill by a wide margin, and it was signed into law by President Trump a few days later.

== See also ==
- Public Law 110-343
- Oregon and California Railroad Revested Lands
