= Oregon and California Railroad =

Former American railroad company

- Oregon and California Railroad (red) and Southern Pacific system (orange) as of 1918

Overview
- Locale: Portland, Oregon via California
- Dates of operation: 1869–1927
- Successor: Southern Pacific

Technical
- Track gauge: 4 ft 8 1/2 in (1,435 mm) standard gauge

The Oregon and California Railroad was formed from the Oregon Central Railroad when it was the first to operate a 20-mile (32 km) stretch south of Portland in 1869. This qualified the railroad for land grants in California, whereupon the name of the railroad soon changed to Oregon & California Rail Road Company. In 1887, the line was completed over Siskiyou Summit, and the Southern Pacific Railroad assumed control of the railroad, although it was not officially sold to Southern Pacific until January 3, 1927. This route was eventually spun off from the Southern Pacific as the Central Oregon and Pacific Railroad.

== Land grants and growth ==
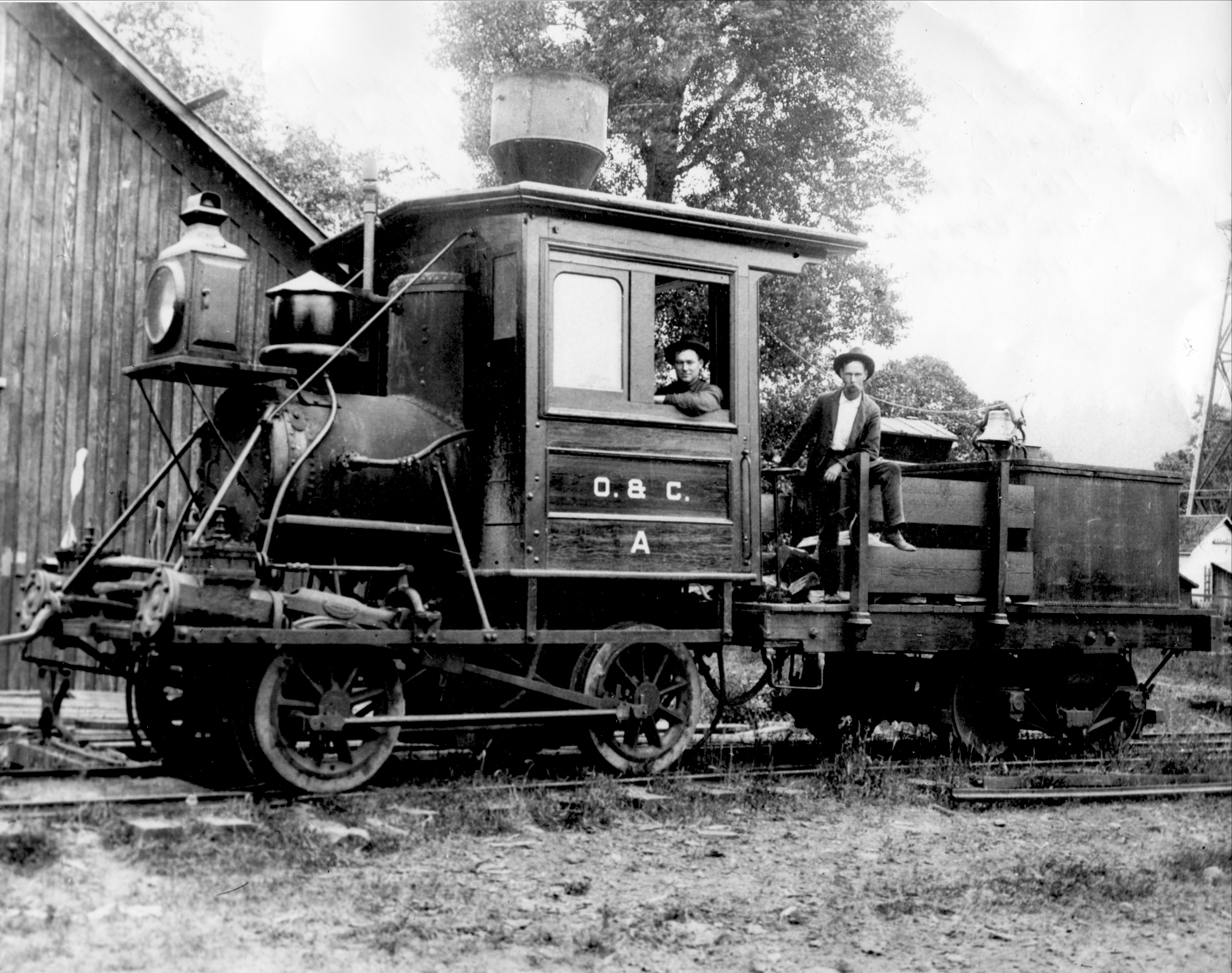
1905 photo of "Old Betsy," an O&C locomotive, taken in Scio, Oregon.

As part of the U.S. government's desire to foster settlement and economic development in the western states, in July 1866, Congress passed the Oregon and California Railroad Act, which made 3,700,000 acres (1,500,000 ha) of land available for a company that built a railroad from Portland, Oregon to San Francisco, distributed by the state of Oregon in 12,800-acre (5,200 ha) land grants for each mile of track completed. Two companies, both of which named themselves the Oregon Central Railroad, began a competition to build the railroad, one on the west side of the Willamette River and one on the east side. The two lines eventually merge and reorganized as the Oregon and California Railroad.

In 1869, Congress changed how the grants were to be distributed, requiring the railroads to sell land along the line to settlers in 160-acre (65 ha) parcels at $2.50 per acre. The purpose of these restrictions was to encourage settlement and economic development, while compensating the O&C Railroad for its costs of construction. Construction efforts were sporadic, finally reaching completion in 1887 after the financially troubled O&C Railroad was acquired by the Southern Pacific. The land was distributed in a checkerboard pattern, with sections laid out for 20 miles (32 km) on either side of the rail corridor with the government retaining the alternate sections for future growth.

By 1872, the railroad had extended from Portland to Roseburg. Along the way, it created growth in Willamette Valley towns such as Canby, Aurora, and Harrisburg, which emerged as freight and passenger stations, and provided a commercial lifeline to the part of the river valley above Harrisburg where steamships were rarely able to travel. As the railroad made its way into the Umpqua Valley, new townsites such as Drain, Oakland, and Yoncalla were laid out.

From about 1870 to 1888, ferry service connected Downtown Portland to the East Portland terminal. The original ferry service, established by Ben Holladay, was near the present-day location of the Steel Bridge; in 1879, Henry Villard put the O&CRR Ferry #2 into service, near the present-day location of the Burnside Bridge. The O&CRR Ferry #2 was rendered obsolete by the construction of the Morrison and Steel bridges, and ultimately relocated to San Francisco, where it was converted to an oil-fueled ferry the "Vallejo" and, later, a famous houseboat, still in use as of 2013.

== Mismanagement and fraud ==
While construction was still ongoing, multiple charges of land fraud arose. The company was accused of rounding up individuals from saloons in Portland's waterfront district, and paying them to sign applications to purchase 160-acre (0.6 km^{2}) parcels of O&C lands as "settlers," then selling these fraudulent instruments in large blocks to corporate interests through corrupt middlemen.

That elaborate money laundering and land fraud scheme was only the beginning: Southern Pacific Railroad eventually abandoned the pretense of nonexistent settlers, and sold lands in large parcels directly to developers for as much as US$40 per acre. By 1902, with land prices soaring, the company declared it was terminating land sales altogether. When the scandal broke in 1904 through an investigation by The Oregonian it had grown to such a magnitude that the paper reported that more than 75% of the land sales had violated federal law.

Newly elected President Theodore Roosevelt, as part of his plan of progressive reforms, vowed in 1903 to "clean up the O&C land fraud mess, once and for all!" Over the following two years, Roosevelt's investigators collected evidence, and over 1,000 politicians, businessmen, railroad executives, and others were indicted. Many were eventually tried and convicted on charges including fraud, bribery, and other corruption. The federal government sought return of the grant lands from the railroad not actually part of the right of way for the railroad line itself.

== Revestiture of lands ==
In 1915, the U.S. Supreme Court decided that the railroad had been built as promised, so the railroad company should not be forced to completely forfeit the lands, despite having violated the terms of the grant. Congress responded in 1916, with the Chamberlain-Ferris Act. This law put the O&C lands back in U.S. federal government control, and compensated the company at an amount equivalent to what it would have received had it abided by the $2.50 per acre limit. Counties with O&C land also received revenue from timber and land sales to make up for the loss of local and state taxation revenue from the land. The law was modified in 1926 by the Stanfield Act, by the 1937 O&C Act, and most recently, by the Secure Rural Schools and Community Self-Determination Act of 2000 which has been renewed several times and includes other rural counties in the United States. As timber revenue on the O&C lands has declined over the years, counties have faced financial difficulty as they struggle to fill the revenue gap.

== See also ==
- Chamberlain-Ferris Act
- Land use in Oregon
- Central Oregon and Pacific Railroad
