= Telephone (sternwheeler) =

American steamboat

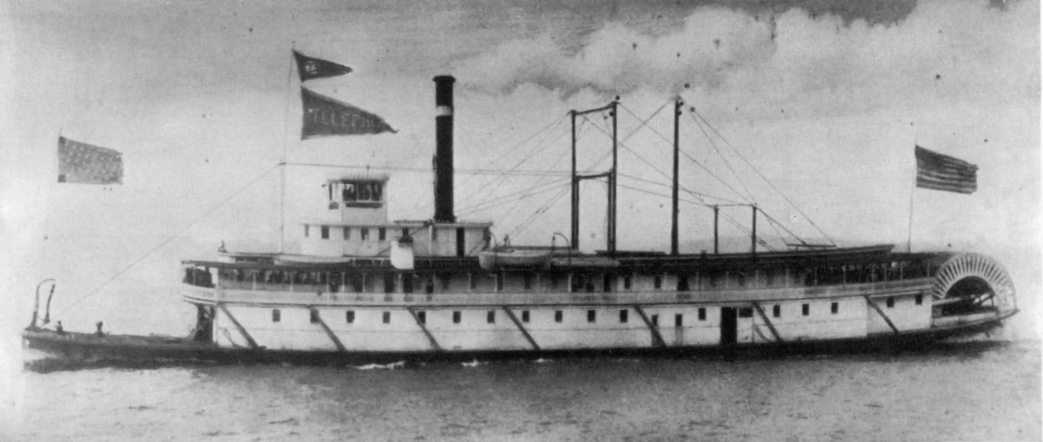

History
- Name: Telephone
- Owner: U.B. Scott
- Route: Willamette; San Francisco Bay
- Cost: $15,000
- Launched: November 6, 1884
- Maiden voyage: March 1, 1885
- Identification: Original (1885) US registry #145400; following first rebuild (1887): 145477; after second rebuild (1903): 200263

General characteristics
- Type: Inland passenger/freight, later, ferry
- Tonnage: In 1885: 385 gross; 334 registered; in 1888; tonnaged increased later.
- Length: As built (1885): 172 ft (52 m) (exclusive of fantail); (1888): 200 ft (61 m); 1903: 201.5 ft (61.4 m)
- Beam: 28 ft (9 m) (exclusive of guards)
- Depth: 7.2 ft (2.2 m) depth of hold
- Installed power: Twin horizontally mounted high-pressure single-cylinder steam engines.
- Propulsion: Stern-wheel
- Speed: 22 miles per hour (maximum)
- Capacity: 793 passengers (1905)

Telephone was a sternwheel-driven steamboat built in 1884 by Captain Uriah Bonsor "U.B." Scott for service on the Columbia River. Reputedly the fastest steamboat in the world in its time, Telephone served on the Columbia River and San Francisco Bay. Telephone was rebuilt at least twice. The first time was after a fire in 1887 which nearly destroyed the vessel. The reconstructed and much larger second vessel was sometimes referred to as Telephone No. 2. The third vessel, Telephone No. 3, built in 1903 and using components from the second steamer was larger but little used during its time on the Columbia river.

== Plans and design ==
Newspaper reports of the plans to construct the steamer which eventually was named Telephone appeared in July 1884. U.B. Scott and his partners intended to build the fast boat on the Columbia river which could make the 110 mile distance from Portland, Oregon to Astoria in five hours. The boat was expected to be complete by December 1, 1884. It was expected to cost $35,000.

== Construction ==
Telephone No. 1 was built in East Portland, Oregon for Captain Uriah Bonser Scott (1827–1913) and his partners. The contract for construction of the vessel was signed on July 18, 1884. Scott was a steamboat owner and captain on the Mississippi and Ohio rivers during, before and after the American Civil War who had come to Oregon in 1873.

The steamer was launched on October 30, 1884. The vessel’s trial trip occurred in February 1885.

Telephone No. 1 was 172 feet long measured over the hull, exclusive of the extension over the stern, called the "fantail" which mounted the sternwheel. Telephone had a width, called "beam", which measured across the hull, and exclusive of the long wide protective timbers along the sides of the hull, called the "guards", of 28 feet, with a depth of hold of 7.2 feet. The steamer drew 3.5 feet of water. The planned draft was 3.5 feet.

The total size of Telephone No. 1, measured in tons, a unit of volume and not weight, was 386.27 gross and 333.97 registered tons.

== Engineering ==
The machinery for Telephone No. 1 was built at Willamette Iron Works in Portland. The engines generated 500 indicated horsepower. The official steamboat identification number was 145400.

Power was furnished by two non-condensing steam engines, with a 22-inch cylinder bore and a stroke of 8 feet. The boiler was 32.5 feet long, 6.5 feet in diameter, containing 280 tubes, each 2.5 inches through, and 18 feet long. Total heating surface was reported to be 3,468 square feet. The purpose of having 280 tubes in the boilers was to raise steam rapidly.

The authorized steam pressure generated by the boilers was 140 pounds per square inch. With the stern-wheel turning at 38 revolutions per minute, the theoretical horsepower generated by both engines combined would be 1301. (According to one report, the stern-wheel made 14 revolutions per minute, with four paddles in the water, two completely and two partially.)

The boilers were wood fired, and when running fast, the consumption of wood was estimated to be approximately 3 cords per hour.

Telephone No. 1 was equipped with three lifeboats and 315 life preservers. The steamer was reported to have cost $15,000 to build, and was insured for $30,000.

In early 1886, Telephone No. 1's stern-wheel was fitted with new paddles, called "buckets". These buckets were twenty inches wide, and were four inches wide on the inside of the while, gradually curving and tapering to one and three-quarter inch thick on the outside of the sternwheel.

This bucket design was thought to improve the speed of the steamer, because less water would have to be lifted off the paddles after they rotated out of the water. Instead, before the bucket reached the level of the stern-wheel shaft, the water would have completely run off. Backing operations were also improved by the new design.

Captain Scott was reported to have estimated fuel savings of 15% as a result of the new paddle design and a speed increase of 10%.

In February 1888, Captain Scott ordered a new pair of cylinders for Telephone No. 2. The new engines would have a 25-inch bore and an eight-foot stroke.

=== Searchlight on Telephone No. 2 ===
In September 1895, Telephone No. 2 was fitted with the most powerful searchlight on the Columbia River, rated at 5,000 candle power. The light was manufactured in New York and had been furnished by Campbell & Swigert, of Portland, and installed by their chief engineer, Joseph Gleason. The light was reported to be "so simply constructed that the pilot can throw it in any desired position by the pressure of three fingers."

== Accommodations ==
Telephone No. 1 had 17 staterooms, with a total of 34 berths between them. (Originally the reported plan was to have 20 staterooms.)

The steamer was licensed to carry 300 passengers overall. Reportedly the vessel was "handsomely furnished throughout in white and gold, and neatness without lavish expenditure is apparent at a glance." Telephone was also the first boat on the Columbia river to carry a piano. The planned length for the main dining hall was 119 feet.

According to another report, as initially built, Telephone had sixteen staterooms, several closets and cupboards, a purser’s office, a dining room, and for and after cabins. The cabin floors were to be of ash. The interior was to be painted white with gold trimmings. Newspaper reports in 1885 claimed that upon completion, Telephone would be the "handsomest as well as the fast boat on the river."

== Launch and initial run ==
According to one source, Telephone was launched on November 6, 1884. Another source gives the launch date as October 30, 1884.

William H. Whitcomb (1851–1923) was the first captain of Telephone, and remained so until the vessel burned. Edgar W. Wright (1863–1930), later a maritime historian, served as mate on Telephone at about the same time.

Telephone was taken out on a trial trip in early February, 1885. On Sunday, January 31, 1885, Telephone steamed down the Willamette River to St. Johns to test the machinery and take on wood for fuel. The seven mile trip, which began at 7:40 a.m., was completed in 28 minutes.

The trial trip was reported to have been successful. At this time the steamer was already being as "said to be the fastest stern-wheeler afloat."

== Finishing construction ==
In the second half of February, 1885, Telephone was undergoing final construction. The upper interior painting was being done. The seats had been taken down to the dock, and were soon to be installed.

Telephone made its first regular trip from Portland to Astoria, Oregon on March 1, 1885. Telephone departed Portland at 9:00 a.m. and arrived in Astoria at 3:40 p.m. or 3:45 p.m. The boat’s fastest time was between Pillar Rock and Astoria, covering the fourteen mile distance in thirty-seven minutes, for a rate of 22 miles per hour. Crowds attended the departure and arrival of the steamer.

Along the way, Telephone made about twenty landings. The steamer carried about 225 passengers on this trip. The actual running time was 5 hours and 26 minutes, for an average speed of 20 miles per hour.

When placed into service, Telephone was reported to have been capable of departing Astoria at 9:00 a.m., and reaching Portland at 2:00 p.m., two hours faster than all other vessels on the river.

In March 1885, the Columbia Transportation Company advertised "fast time for Portland!" on Telephone, with the steamer departing Wilson & Fisher’s dock in Astoria every Monday, Wednesday, and Friday at 6 a.m., and arriving at Portland at 1:00 p.m. Returning to Astoria, Telephone would depart Portland on Tuesdays and Thursdays, arriving in Astoria at 1:00 p.m. An extra trip would be made every Sunday morning, leaving Portland at 9:00 a.m. Passengers on this trip could make a connection to the overland route to the Puget Sound region at Kalama, W.T.

Telephone was able to hold to the five hour running time even in adverse conditions, such as fog on the river, incoming tides, and wind blowing against the steamer’s run, even when all three were combined.

== Speed ==
Telephone No. 1 was one of the fastest steamers on the Columbia River Indeed, Telephone was reputed to have been "the fastest sternwheeler in the world."

Telephone No. 1 replaced the propeller-driven steamer Fleetwood, itself considered a speedy vessel, on the Portland-Astoria run.

On one of its first runs to Astoria from Portland, Telephone No. 1 made the round trip in 11 hours and four minutes. On July 2, 1887, Telephone ran downriver from Portland to Astoria in the unheard-of time of four hours, thirty-four and one-half minutes, even while heading into a gale during the last 40 miles. Reportedly when in peak trim, Telephone was capable of reaching 22 miles per hour.

== Early operations ==
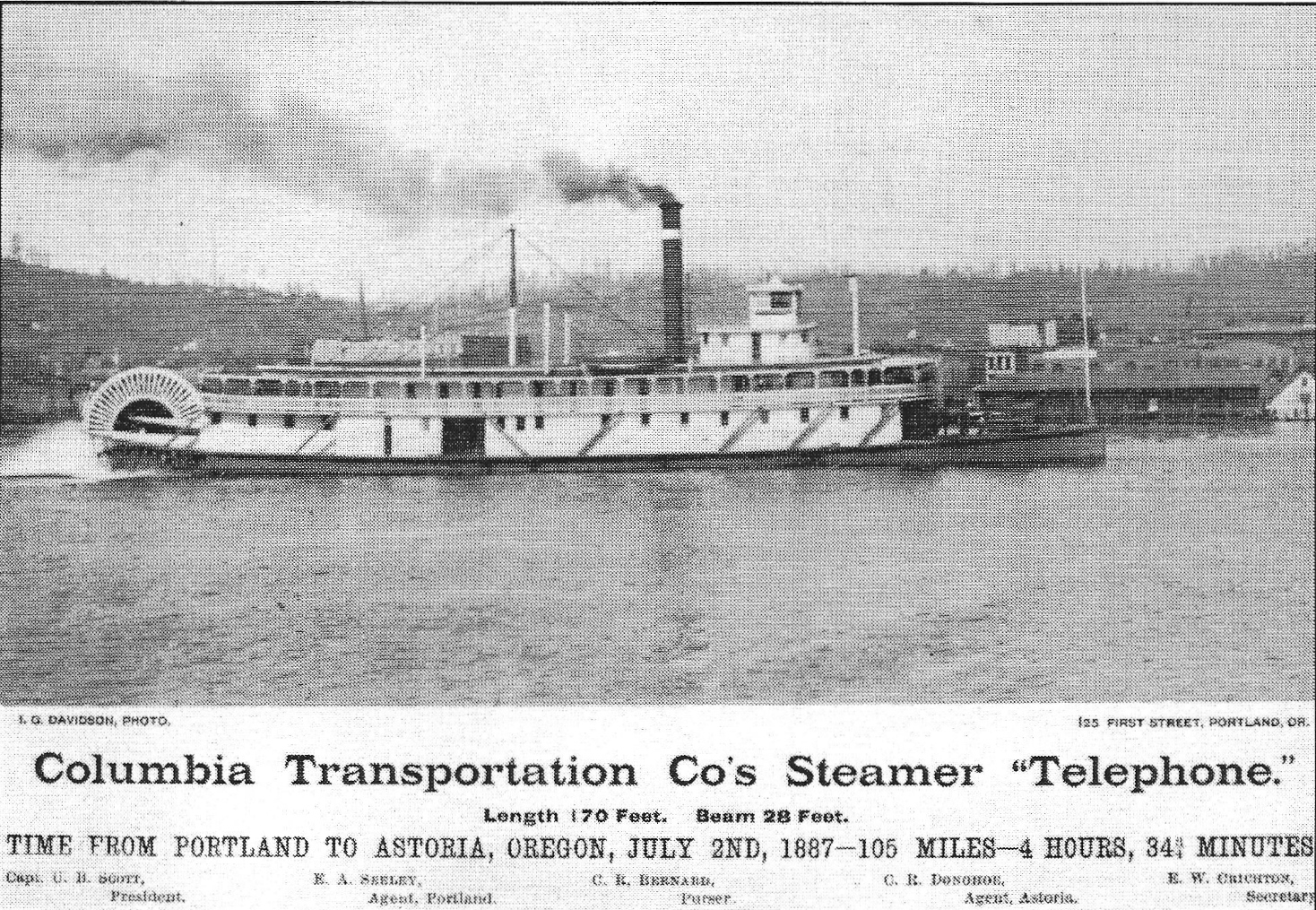
Advertisement for steamer Telephone, circa 1887

In April 1885, Telephone was scheduled to depart Astoria, from the Wilson & Fisher’s dock, for Portland every Monday, Wednesday and Friday, arriving at Portland at 1:00 pm.

Starting in the 1880s, the Long Beach Peninsula was a popular summer vacation destination for residents of the Portland area. Steamers would run to the dock at Ilwaco, Washington, and passengers would then travel overland to the resort areas of the peninsula.

In August 1885, E.A. Seely, agent for Telephone, worked out a plan to provide service from Astoria to Ilwaco with J.H.D. Gray, agent for the Ilwaco Steam Navigation Company.

Steamers of the ISN, either the General Miles or the then-new General Canby would meet Telephone at Astoria, and then depart immediately for Ilwaco, without waiting for other steamers to arrive at Astoria. This was claimed to trim three hours off the travel time to Ilwaco.

In 1887, Telephone set the record for speed on the Portland-Astoria route.

== Near destruction by fire ==
At 6:00 in the evening, while en route from Portland to Astoria on Sunday, November 20, 1887, Telephone caught fire and was nearly destroyed. The fire occurred just down river from Tongue's Point, near Astoria. On board at the time were 140 or 150 passengers and 32 crew.

The fire started in the oil-room and spread quickly. The steamer was rapidly approaching Wolson & Fisher's dock at Astoria, and preparations were being made for the landing when the fire occurred. A large crowd had gathered on the dock to greet the people arriving on the boat.

A cry was heard: "the Telephone is on fire." Some of the people along the waterfront, and on the ships moored in the harbor saw a bright flame shoot above the steamer's wheelhouse.

Fire control efforts on Telephone failed. Captain Scott was at the wheel, and he quickly turned the steamer towards shore. There were docks along the shore at this point, but Scott was able to maneuver the boat into a gap between two piers towards the shore.

The engineer also increased the speed so the steamer could reach the beach faster.

Normally an increase in speed would accelerate the rate of the progression of the fire, but a rapid landing was the only course of action to be taken. As a result, Telephone hit the beach at 20 miles per hour. Only three minutes passed between the report of the fire and the beaching of the vessel.

According to Alf. D. Rowen, the owner of the Oysterville Journal newspaper:

I was in the pilot-house. Scott was at the wheel; Whitcomb was there also. The boat was about abreast the Scandinavian Packing Company’s premises. Someone shouted through the speaking-tube, "Boat afire!" Scott showed the most nerve of any man I ever saw in danger. He knew just what to do, and did it. Whitcomb sprang down to the cabin, and did all he could to allay the excitement. The officers and crew all behaved splendidly.

In less than ten minutes the vessel was completely on fire. All passengers save one intoxicated man escaped, as did all the crew. The man, a Swedish logger named Peter Hanson, was badly burned and had to be taken to the hospital, where he died.

The pilot house steps had burned while Captain Scott stayed at the wheel, and he escaped through the window just before the entire upper works caved in.

The Astoria fire department was summoned to the scene. They were able to save enough of the hull to allow the vessel to be rebuilt. The new Telephone was launched in early 1888, and was under the command of Capt. Thomas H. Crang (b.1858) for at least six years after that.

== Rebuilt and relaunched ==
=== Reconstruction ===
In late November 1887, the hull of the burned Telephone was towed upriver to Portland by the steamer Governor Newell. Once in Portland, the steamer’s insurance losses would be adjusted.

By January 1, 1888, a decision had been made to rebuild Telephone. Work was already under way at that time. The hull would be lengthened by 25 feet. The boiler was to be reused, but the engines would be new.

=== Relaunched ===
The rebuilt Telephone was launched on Saturday, April 28, 1888, before a crowd of about 1,500 people.

Following the 1888 reconstruction, Telephone was a larger vessel. Gross tonnage had increased to 500, and the registered tonnage went up to 443. At the guards, Telephone No. 2 was three feet wider, and from the guards up, four feet wider. The length of the boat had increased from 170 to 200 feet. Howe trusses and solid bulkheads were installed in the hull. The freight capacity would be 300 tons.

The number of cabins was increased to 25. Fire protection was improved, with additional fire valves and hoses. Two side stairs now led to the upper deck rather than a single center set of stairs as in the original vessel. U.B. Scott estimated that the rebuilt vessel’s speed would be 20 miles per hour.

The 1888 Telephone also received a new steamboat registry number, which was 145477.

== Operations resumed ==
By the time these hasty notes were penciled the familiar tones of the whistle had been twice heard, and three o'clock the Telephone cast off and started for Portland on her first up trip, her flags and streamers fluttering in the breeze, the blue water lapping her lines and gleaming in the brilliant sunlight, and her decks crowded with passengers, a straight column of white steam from her white collared smoke stack, as with splashing wheel and rushing prow she started on her career, receiving a parting cheer from those who had remained to see her off.

— Daily Morning Astorian, May 20, 1888.

The rebuilt Telephone made its trial trip to Astoria on Saturday, May 20. The rebuilt Telephone, sometimes known as Telephone No. 2 was scheduled to make its first trip from Portland to Astoria on May 19, 1888. Telephone No. 2 departed Portland on Friday morning, May 19, 1888, clearing the railroad bridge at 7:08 a.m., and arriving in Astoria at 2:00 p.m.

Along the way Telephone No. 2 stopped at all of its regular landings, including St. Helens, Kalama, Washington, Rainier, and Skamokawa. The Daily Astorian reported that "all along the river it was a continual ovation, people cheering as she passed, and at every landing place crowding aboard 'to see the new boat.'" Officers on board were U.B. Scott, captain, Thomas Crang, pilot, C.R. Barnard, purser, C.J. Hooghkirk, mate, I.N. Scott (nephew of U.B. Scott), chief engineer, Perry Scoot, assistant engineer, John McGillan, steward. The steamer’s agent in Portland was E.A. Seeley, and the Astoria agent was Charles R. Donohoe (c1848-1918). Donohoe also served for 12 years as purser on Telephone.

During this trip, Telephone No. 2 carried only 100 pounds steam pressure in its boilers, although it was licensed for up to 140 pounds pressure.

In February 1891 the Columbia River and Puget Sound Navigation Co. was incorporated, with U.B. Scott as president, John Leary as vice president, L.B. Seely as second vice president, and E.W. Creighton as secretary-treasurer. The other directors were E.A. Seeley and Capt. Zephaniah J. Hatch (b.1846), although Hatch’s interest was soon acquired by the other principals. The new company acquired Telephone No. 2.

From 1888 to about 1894, Telephone was used on the Portland-Astoria route. On this route, Telephone was matched against the crack sidewheeler T.J. Potter. In 1894 alone, Telephone No. 2 made 312 round trips on this route, steaming a total of 65,920 miles and making 12,731 landings.

The fast steamer Hassalo was one of Telephone No. 2's chief competitors in the 1890s on the Astoria route.

== Monopoly plans of the Union Pacific ==
Prior to March 1892, Telephone was being operated in conjunction with the Union Pacific railroad. Telephone had been laid up for repairs, during which time it was replaced by the Harvest Queen. When Telephone was returned to the Astoria route, the understanding with the Union Pacific had ended. In March 1892, it was expected that six steamers would soon be running on the Portland-Astoria route.

Reportedly the plans of the Union Pacific were to achieve a monopoly control over the route, by running R.R. Thompson and Harvest Queen at night, and T.J. Potter and Telephone during the day. This scheme was reported upset when Jacob Kamm, owner of Lurline, Undine, and the then new Ocean Wave, refused to renew a lease to the UP on Lurline and Undine, which had expired in December 1891.

It was reported that had the lease been renewed, UP would have pulled Lurline and Undine off the route on the lower Columbia river. With the plans for monopoly broken in March 1892 when Telephone returned to service, UP put its fastest boat, the T.J. Potter on the run to Astoria in competition with Telephone.

== Operations in the late 1890s ==
In 1895, Telephone, owned by the Columbia River and Puget Sound Navigation Company, (CR&PSN) was competing with the older steamer R.R. Thompson, built in 1878, and the newer T.J. Potter, built in 1888. Both competitors, particularly the Potter, were considered to be fast boats.

Early in 1895, the CR&PSN spent nearly $20,000 in improvements to another one of their steamers, the famous sternwheeler Bailey Gatzert. With Bailey Gatzert and Telephone running on alternate days to Portland, the city of Astoria received the finest steamboat service that it had ever had.

In March 1896, the White Collar Line (officially, the Columbia River and Puget Sound Navigation Company) controlled the stern-wheel steamers Telephone and Bailey Gatzert, as well as the side-wheel (a rare type on the Columbia River) steamer Ocean Wave.

All three steamers departed the Alder Street dock in Portland for Astoria, where connections would be made either with other steamers running north across the Columbia River to Ilwaco or south along the Oregon coast at Young’s Bay via the Seashore Railroad. Once at Ilwaco, connections would be made by rail travel via the narrow gauge Ilwaco Railway and Navigation Company to Long Beach, Ocean Park, and, on Willapa Bay, Nahcotta, Washington. Telephone left the Alder Street dock daily at 7:00 a.m. except on Sundays. Returning, Telephone departed Astoria at 7:00 p.m. daily, also excepting Sundays.

Freight carried on Telephone also included droves of cattle.

The opening of the railroad from Portland to Astoria cut into the passenger carriage business of the Telephone, so that on June 2, 1898, Telephone carried only 75 passengers, yet this was the largest number since rail operations had commenced.

== Collisions and accidents ==
=== January 1892 sinking ===
In January 1892 Telephone was reported to have been sunk. A contract to raise the Telephone was awarded to Paquet & Co, who arranged to hire the two largest barges on the Columbia river. These barges were the Northern Pacific Railway’s reserve rail transfer barge kept at Kalama, Washington and the Portland terminal company’s transfer barge. On January 10, 2010, Follett, a diver, worked on clearing snags away from the bow of the Telephone, so that the barges could be brought alongside the sunken vessel.

One barge would be placed on each side of the steamer, and then timbers laid across from one barge to the over, across the steamer. Chains would be run under the sunken hull, and fastened to the timbers. The chains would then be cranked up by jacks and levers, until Telephone would be hanging in the water held up by the chains. The hole in the hull would be patched and the water pumped out. Telephone would then be brought to a boatyard in Portland at the foot at East Jefferson Street.

On January 25, 1892, Telephone was reported to be at the Alder Street dock in Portland, undergoing repairs to the boat’s upper works. The boat was expected to be transferred son to the East Jefferson street yard, where the holes in the hull would be repaired, the boat would be painted, and new furniture and carpeting installed.

On March 2, 1892, it was reported that Telephone would resume service on the Astoria route the following day.

In January 1892, while running upriver to Portland in a dense fog under the command of Pilot William Larkins, Telephone missed a navigation guide light and collided with the breakwater at the confluence of the Willamette and the Columbia rivers, ripping a large hole in the right side bow of the steamer.

The boats were lowered and all passengers taken off and landed on Coon Island.

Water flooded in, and Telephone sank so that only the bow was visible above the water’s surface. The steamer appeared to be a total loss, but remained hanging on the breakwater for about a week, which was enough time to raise the vessel. Once Telephone was raised, the damage appeared to be not so severe.

=== Collision with R.R.Thompson ===
On August 25, 1892, Telephone collided with the sternwheeler R.R. Thompson at Rainer, Oregon, on the Columbia River. The case was investigated by the steamboat inspection service, and as a result, on September 9, 1892, the license of Charles Spinner, master and pilot of R.R. Thompson, was suspended for 20 days for negligence and unskillfulness. The license of T.H. Crang, master and pilot of Telephone, was suspended for 10 days, for violation of Rule VIII of the Pilot Rules and Regulations for steamers.

=== Collision with Ocean Wave ===
In January 1893, on the Willamette River, Telephone No. 2, while making a landing to pick up some hogs at the North Portland stockyards, ran into an anchored ship, breaking the ship’s bow sprit. Telephone backed away from the ship, and in so doing collided with Ocean Wave, smashing the sternwheel on Telephone. Damage to Ocean Wave was about $200 and, to Telephone, about $500.

=== Collision with Northwest ===
On the morning of Tuesday, February 28, 1895, Telephone collided with the smaller sternwheeler Northwest (135 feet; 324 gross tons) at Portland in foggy conditions. There were no injuries to anyone. Telephone was not damaged much, but Northwest had to be taken out of service for repairs.

== Racing ==
The heyday of speed came with the building of the big boats in the 1880s—Telephone, T.J. Potter, Bailey Gatzert. When they swung out of the dock at Portland, threshed spray as their wheels reversed, and started down the river, they were worth watching; long, lean, clean-lined, tall stacks throwing a pennant of smoke, a banner with the boat’s name on the jackstaff, and the national ensign at the king-post or stern, they cut the water away on either side, leaving long arrowheads of waves making toward the shore and a straight wake of froth behind.

— Randall V. Mills, Sternwheelers Up Columbia.

=== Telephone No. 1 ===
Telephone No. 1 was noted for having engaged, under the command of Capt. W.H. Whitcomb and chief engineer Newton Scott, in races on the Columbia river with the large iron-hulled side-wheel steamer Alaskan.

Telephone No. 1 also raced against Alaskan's sister vessel, the side-wheeler Olympian in 1886–87.

Races between Telephone No. 1, under Captain Whitcomb, with Edgar W. Wright, first officer, were daily occurrences with Olympian, running under Capt. James W. Troup. Telephone No. 1 was much faster than Olympian, so Troup had to resort to strategy to keep ahead. When Telephone would stop at landings along the route, Olympian would pass the rival boat. Other times, Olympian would try to crowd Telephone out of the river channel.

A few years before, on July 20, 1885, Capt. U.B. Scott denied that Telephone was racing the Potter, but did state that he would be willing to match times with the Potter, departing one-half hour earlier or later than the rival vessel, if the Potter's managers consented to this test of speed.

=== Telephone No. 2 ===
On Sunday, August 5, 1894, five steamboats raced up the Columbia River from Astoria. The five steamers departed Astoria in a group, with Lurline in the lead, followed by Ocean Wave, Telephone, Sarah Dixon, and T.J. Potter. Every boat was crowded to its fullest. The Potter reached Portland first, followed by Lurline, Telephone, Ocean Wave, and Sarah Dixon.

On Monday, June 17, 1895, Telephone, under the personal command of Capt. U.B. Scott, raced T.J. Potter from Portland to Astoria. Telephone had recently undergone a thorough overhaul, which included, among other things, installation of a new and more powerful dynamo. This was the first run of the Telephone following completion of the overhaul.

Both boats left Portland at the same time, but the Potter was in the lead, having had a berth one-third of a mile downriver from Telephone. Telephone arrived first at St. Helens, Oregon, but the Potter was the first to depart. Telephone then arrived first at Kalama, Washington, but again Potter was first to depart. Telephone was in the lead coming into Rainier, Oregon, where both boats took on wood to fuel their boilers.

Telephone arrived at Astoria at 1:15 p.m., beating the Potter by one hour and a quarter. Telephone also made all the stops along the river, which the Potter did not do.

One day in August 1895, Telephone and T.J. Potter were to depart Portland bound down river. Telephone shot ahead of Potter through an open drawbridge. Just as Potter's pilot was about to order full steam to challenge Telephone, Major O'Neill, receiver of the Oregon Railway and Navigation Company, boarded the Potter. O'Neill would not tolerate racing of the company's boats, and the anticipated race never came off.

In April 1906 it was reported that a watchman who had been the watchman on Telephone No. 3 for two years was believed to have been drowned. On April 26, 1906, the body of the watchman, William B. Flannigan, was found not far from the steamer. It was surmised from finger marks on the boat's railing that Flannigan had fallen into the river when trying to board the Telephone by climbing over the railing rather than using the gangway.

On December 16, 1907, Elmer Durland, age 19, a watchman’s helper on Telephone No. 3, drowned in the Willamette River while rowing away from the steamer in a small boat which suddenly capsized.

=== Telephone No. 3 ===
On September 20, 1905, Telephone No. 3, which had been only recently returned to service, raced down the Willamette River against Bailey Gatzert. That night the captains of the two vessels, E.W. Baughman, of Telephone, and Fred Sherman, of Bailey Gatzert, were arrested by harbormaster Ben Biglin, and charged with exceeding the 8 mile per hour speed limit on the Willamette River.

The combined wakes of the two steamers had, it was charged, so rocked the freighter Arabla, which had been moored at the flour mills, that the cable holding Arabia to the pier had parted, and it was only with two hours of effort that the ship was kept from floating downriver. Both steamer captains were released on $50 bail.

On October 8, 1905, Telephone readily beat Charles R. Spencer on in a race to Cascade Locks, with Telephone arriving seven minutes ahead of Spencer. The two boats did not race in the Willamette however.

In November 1905, Telephone and two other steamers, Charles R. Spencer and Dalles City cast off lines at Portland and raced down the Willamette River. The wakes created by the racing boats caused the British steamship Agincourt to rock so much that its stern lines broke and its gangway and railings were splintered. The three captains were fined $50 each for breaking the harbor speed limit.

== Steam whistle ==
Steamers on the Columbia River were equipped with steam whistles, which often had distinctive tones. Telephone's whistle (later installed on Bailey Gatzert) could be heard and recognized for 15 miles. The whistle was so distinctive that it could be recognized by the dogs of Cathlamet, Washington, where Captain Scott customarily dropped off the table scraps. When they heard the whistle, they would gather down at the Cathlamet landing with the expectation of food.

== 1903 reconstruction (Telephone No. 3) ==
=== Telephone No. 2 unfit for service ===
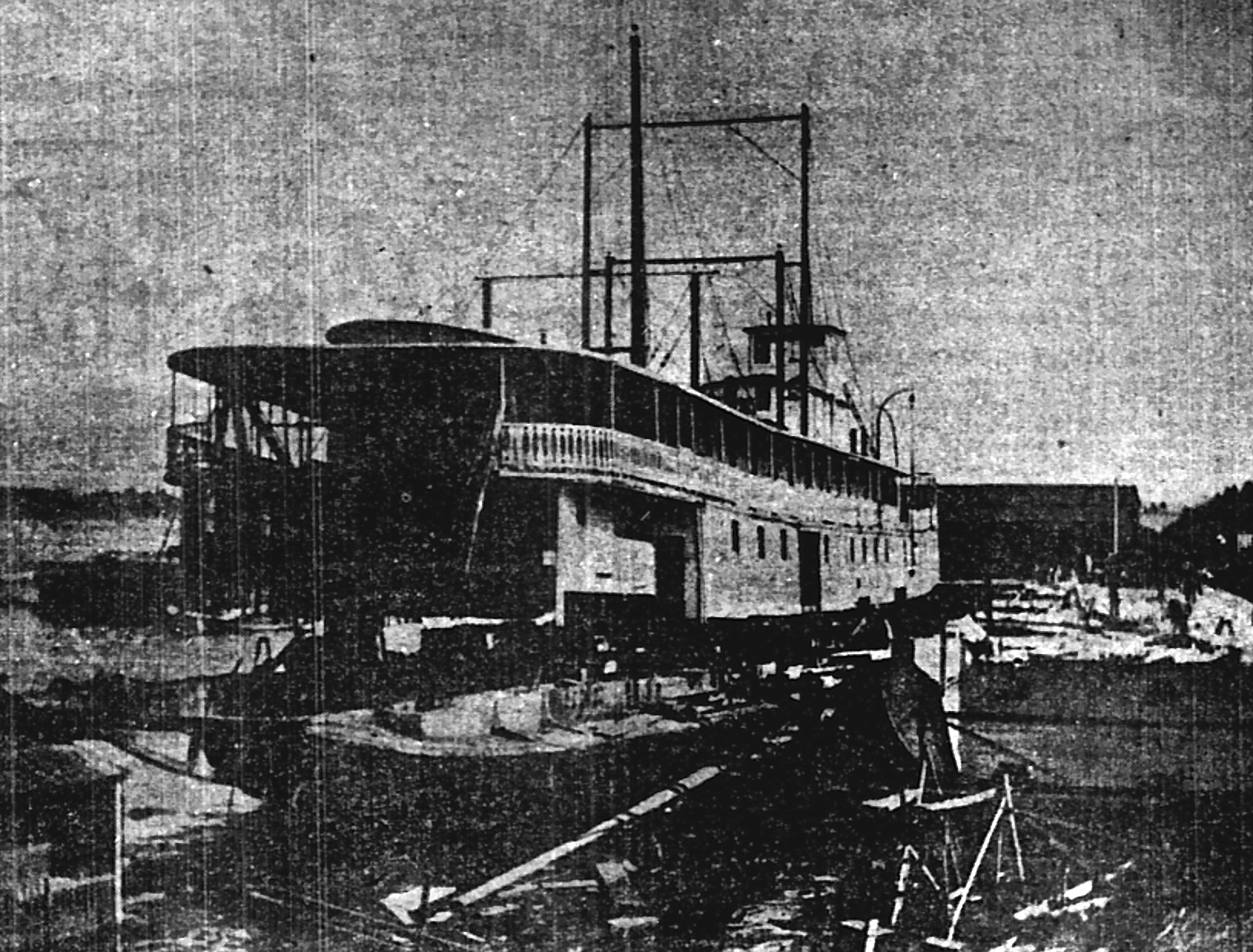
Telephone No. 3 under reconstruction in June 1903

Telephone No. 2 had been running under the ownership of the Columbia River and Puget Sound Navigation Company (also known as the White Collar Line), which sold all of its assets to the Dalles, Portland & Astoria Navigation Company (also known as the Regulator Line). These assets did not include Telephone No. 2, however, as the steamer was considered unfit for service, and had not been operated after 1899, when it carried some troops from Vancouver, Washington to Portland in a little more than an hour.

As of June 1902, Telephone No. 2 had not been in use for several years, and had been lying at the foot of Jefferson Street in Portland, where one John Stewart was the watchman on the steamer.

=== Sale to Arrow Navigation Company ===
In January 1903, it was reported that Telephone No. 2 would be "practically rebuilt" to assist the other boats of the White Collar line during the summer season.

In 1903, a newly formed steamboat concern, Arrow Navigation Co., acquired Telephone No. 2 and had the steamer completely rebuilt by Joseph Pacquet at Portland.

In March, 1903, Telephone No. 2 was sold to Arrow Navigation by H.C. Campbell as trustee. Campbell had taken over Telephone No. 2 and a new steamer, Arrow which was then being completed in Portland by shipbuilder Joseph Pacquet.

=== Reconstruction plans and progress ===
It was reported that Telephone No. 2 was to be "practically rebuilt" at the yard of the Portland Shipbuilding Company. New engines, reportedly acquired by Campbell at the same time as he obtained the boats, were to be installed into the steamer. Once the reconstruction work was completed, the plan was for the Arrow Navigation Company to take it around the Olympic Peninsula to operate on Puget Sound, with the exact route not publicly known as of March 1903.

Construction began with the laying of the keel at the boatyard at the food of Clay Street on April 8, 1903. The new hull was built alongside the old steamer, which had been pulled out of the water. By mid-June 1903, work on the new hull was complete, with the plan being to shift the entire cabin structure (called the "house") of the old steamer over on to the newly built hull, using winches turned by horses. This was scheduled to occur on Sunday, June 14, 1903.

Work was still being done on July 21, with the objective, according to builder Joseph Paquet, to finish the boat in 30 days. The engine cylinders had been placed on board, but the boiler was still at the Willamette Boiler Works. Painting still had to be done, as well as installation of railings and a new tin roof.

As of September 23, 1903, reconstruction still had not been completed. The steamer was lying at the dock of the Willamette Boiler Works, having had almost all the machinery installed except for a little piping. Work remaining, which had to be done upriver at the Pacquet yard at the foot of Clay Street, included painting and furnishing of cabins and staterooms. There were various rumors about where the new vessel would be employed, with Puget Sound being thought to be unlikely by Capt. U.B. Scott, as he did not see how the boat could be profitable there.

=== Strikes and financial problems ===
The total cost of the new steamer was about $70,000. At the end of September, before the boat could be taken back to the Pacquet yard for the final work, the twelve carpenters working on the steamer went on strike. The carpenters had not been paid for five weeks, and some said seven. Willamette Iron Works also had an unpaid bill against Arrow Navigation Co., but it apparently expected the bill to be paid, as their engineers remained at work while the carpenters walked off.

Although the wage liens were settled, various contractors on the 1903 reconstruction were not paid, and they filed liens, sometimes called against the steamer. The total value of the liens was $15,488. By comparison, the vessel was insured during the reconstruction for $27,000 by the St. Paul Fire & Marine Insurance Company.

The backers of the Arrow Navigation Company, who were said to be the Isaacs family of Walla Walla pulled out of the steamboat business, and Telephone went back into the ownership of Captain U.B. Scott.

=== Changes in dimensions ===
Following the 1903 reconstruction, the overall size of the steamer was increased to 793 gross and 539 registered tons. Length of the hull (exclusive of the fantail on which the stern-wheel was mounted) was 201.5 feet, beam 31.6 feet, and depth of hold 8 feet. In the new machinery, the heating surface in the boilers was 5900 inches, and the boat was licensed to carry 190 pounds pressure of steam. The passenger capacity was 794, the largest on the river.

Telephone also received a new steamboat registry number, 200263.

After the 1903 rebuild, Telephone was not used on a full-time basis, but found only brief seasonal use. In 1907 Telephone was chartered to the Regulator Line, to run between Portland and The Dalles. Telephone replaced Joseph Kellogg on this route, with the Kellogg going to the Willamette River service.

In February, 1904, the hull of Telephone No. 2 (minus the upper house which had been transferred to Telephone No. 3) was acquired by M.C. Harrison & Co.

=== New vessel kept out of service ===
Complete except for furnishings, Telephone No. 3 remained out of service through March 1904, as its owners were rumored to be looking for anyone who might be willing to rent the vessel. Telephone No. 3 remained tied up at the Haseltine dock into August 1904 with no word as to when or where the vessel might be placed into service, with the owners refusing to explain.

=== Sale of hull of Telephone No. 2 ===
Later that month, the hull of Telephone No. 2 had been sold by its owners, M.C. Harrison & Co. to E.J. Kiss, of United States Launch Co. Kiss was reported to be planning to tow Telephone No. 2 across the Willamette River to a point near the Joseph Supple shipyard where he would use the steamer as a workshop.

=== Continued idleness ===
In October 1904, Telephone No. 3 remained tied up at the dock in Portland and was the subject of constant waterfront rumors and speculation. This continued until December 1904 when an attorney, J.H. Middleton, was reported to be the owner of Telephone No. 3. The boat was still tied up in February 1905. In May 1905, U.B. Scott and another steamboat captain, H.B. Kennedy, came to Portland to inspect Telephone No. 3 with a view to possibly purchasing the steamer and taking it to Puget Sound.

== Brief excursion service in 1905 ==
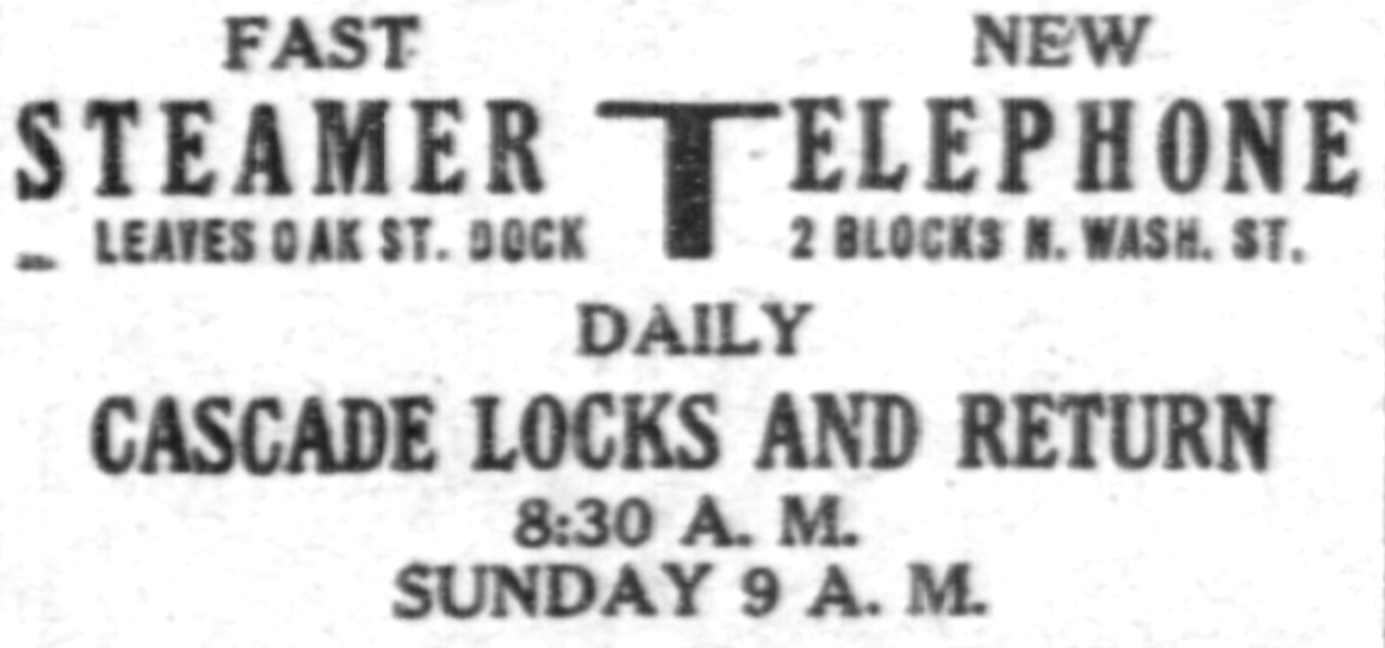
Advertisement for steamer Telephone, placed September 17, 1905

On July 15, 1905, Telephone was reported to still at the Haseltine dock, having been freshly painted with steam up in the boiler, although it was still a mystery as to what route the boat would be placed on. Telephone No. 3 was reported to be licensed to carry 690 passengers if wood was used as fuel, and 720 if oil was used.

Telephone finally moved from its dock at about 3:30 p.m. on August 21, 1905. The boat made a preliminary run down the Willamette River past Linnton and then back, making a stop for wood along the way.

By early September 1905, Telephone No. 3 was in commercial service for the first time, carrying an excursion of letter-carrier conventioneers up the Columbia Gorge to Cascade Locks. The actual run was made on September 10, 1905, under Captains Cochran and E.W. Baughman, with 617 passengers on board.

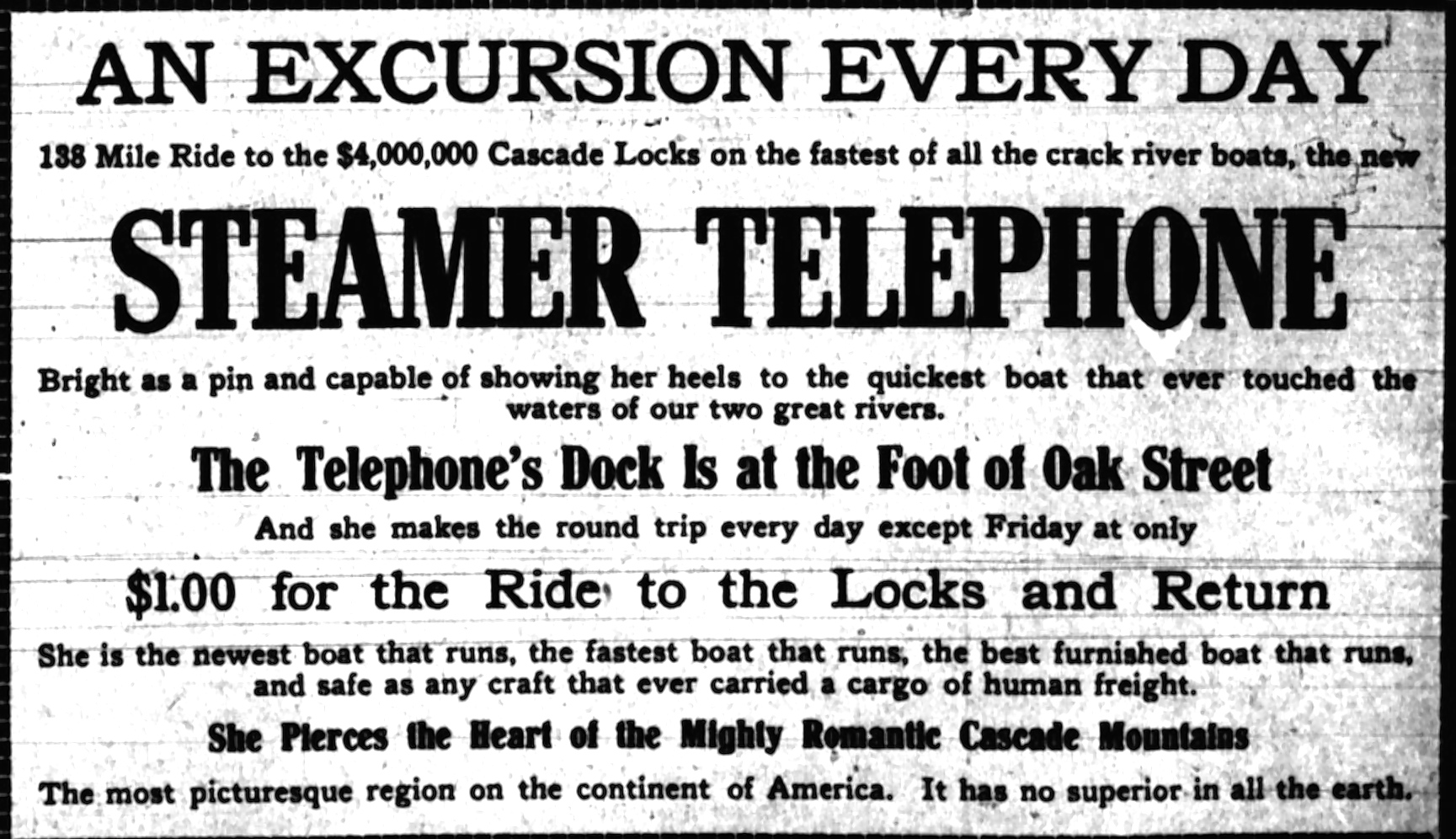
Advertisement for steamer Telephone, published September 25, 1905

On September 19, 1905, Telephone was advertised as making daily runs to Cascade Locks, Oregon, departing the Oak Street dock in Portland at 8:30 a.m. (9:00 a.m. on Sundays). Excursion work dropped off sharply by mid-October 1905 with the coming of the fall rainy weather. The Lewis and Clark Centennial Exposition, which had brought a lot of visitors into Portland, also ended on October 14, 1905.

As of October 24, 1905, Telephone was taken off the Cascades Locks run and tied up again at Portland, with no new route being announced. On November 3, 1905, it was reported that Telephone would be tied up until spring. The crew had quit. Captain Baughman resigned to take over as master of the sternwheeler J.M. Hannaford on the Snake River.

By mid-August 1906 Telephone No. 3 still had not been placed in service despite having missed a good part of the busy summer season, at a time when other steamers were enjoying a good business. The reason for this remained unknown to the general public. The boat remained out of service as of September 21, 1906, lying at Portland at the Duniway dock on the east side of the Willamette River. The steamer was still of service through February 1907 when there was talk of sale of the vessel for use in California on San Francisco Bay and the Sacramento River.

== 1907 charter to Regulator Line ==
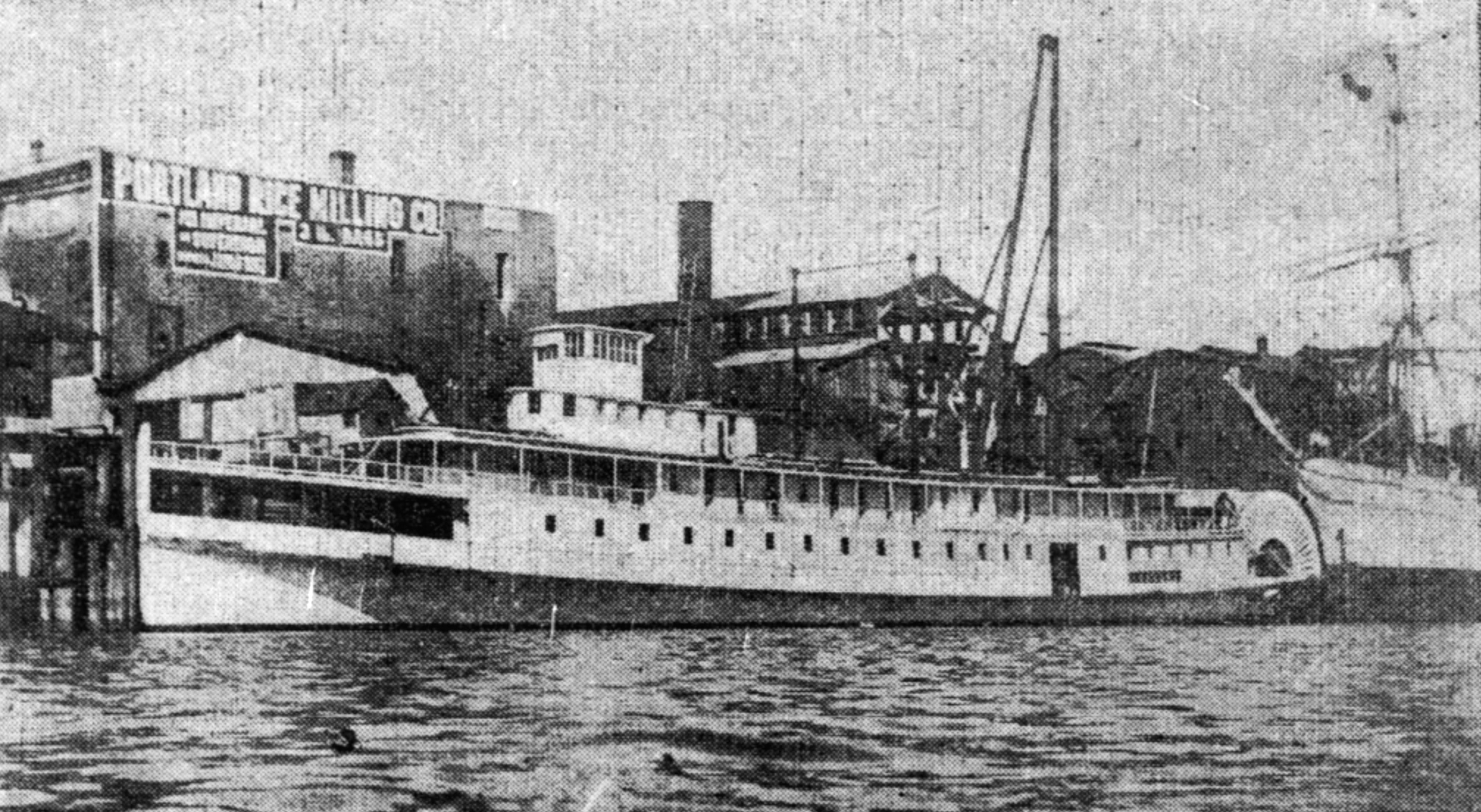
Telephone No. 3 at dock in Portland, April 1907

In April 1907, Telephone No. 3 was returned to service after being tied up for almost three years by way of a lease to the Regulator Line. The boat would operate between Portland and The Dalles, Oregon in place of the Joseph Kellogg, which the Regulator Line was returning to its owners. Until Telephone No. 3 could be brought into service, the Capital City would be making a few trips in passenger service.

On April 18, 1907, Telephone No. 3 was approved by steamboat inspectors Capt E.S. Edwards and Fuller to operate with the Regulator Line.

The steamer, which had not turned its stern-wheel since October 1905, was scheduled to make an initial trip on April 20, 1907, carrying no passengers. Repairs to the steering gear were necessary. The boat had been converted to coal-firing rather than wood by the installation of new grates.

On April 26, 1907, Telephone No. 3 left on its first regular run to the Dalles. Captain Fred H. Sherman was in command. The Regulator Line intended to run the boat to the Dalles three times a week until Bailey Gatzert could be rebuilt and brought into service. The Regulator Line’s lease on Telephone No. 3 ran for two and one-half months, with an option for an additional 15 days. Fare on Sunday excursions to Cascade Locks was $1.00, with meals costing 50 cents. On an excursion on Sunday, July 21, 1907, to Cascade Locks, Telephone carried its legal limit of 600 passengers, and one man was refused passage because the passenger limit had been reached.

== Replacement by Bailey Gatzert ==
In late August, 1907, the reconstruction of the steamer Bailey Gatzert was almost complete. Bailey Gatzert was launched at 11:30 a.m. on August 24, 1907, from the yard of the Portland Shipbuilding Company in south Portland. Bailey Gatzert was to be the flagship of the Regulator Line and upon entry into service, it would replace Telephone. Telephone was scheduled to make its final trip to The Dalles for the Regulator Line on Monday, August 26, 1907. The crew of Telephone was scheduled to be transferred over to the Bailey Gatzert on Wednesday, August 30, 1907.

There was one final race downriver on the Willamette on August 26, 1907, between Telephone and Telegraph. The race began once both steamers had passed the harbor limits, with both boats running side by side at speeds exceeding 20 miles per hour. By the time that the Columbia was reached, Telephone had a lead of several boat lengths over Telegraph, and had lashed a broom, the traditional symbol of victory in a steamboat race, to its jackstaff.

After being replaced, Telephone was tied up to a dock at the foot of Morrison Street on the west side of the Willamette River. The river at this point was reported to be particularly polluted, with Telephone being blamed as the main culprit for dumping "decaying vegetables, boxes containing maggot-infested corn, and other polluting debris". All of this was alleged in one newspaper report to be the cause of an excessive number of disease-infected rats in the area of the Portland waterfront.

As of early February 1909, Telephone had been out of service for over a year. There were rumors that Telephone might have been sold, or possibly placed on the run to The Dalles, but the steamer’s owner was unwilling or unable to confirm any of them. Telephone remained tied up at a location in the Willamette River known as the Victoria dolphins through June 1909.

== Transfer to California ==
In 1909 Telephone was sold to be taken to San Francisco Bay for service as a ferry.

On July 14, 1909, representatives of the Western Pacific Railroad put down some earnest money on the Telephone, with the deal anticipated to close the following day. The purchase price was $24,500. The new owner intended to use the boat on San Francisco Bay to carry construction material and for transfer work. Although the boat was reputed to be in first class condition, it had only been worked for a few months in 1905 and 1907 since it had been constructed in 1903.

At 9:00 a.m. on Tuesday, August 3, 1909, Telephone left Portland under its own steam for the last time, bound for Astoria. The steamer reached Astoria at 2:30 p.m. the same day, and was scheduled to depart the following morning for San Francisco in the company of the steam schooner Yosemite. Telephone was expected to make the entire trip under its own power, but as riverine vessel and not having been built for operation on the open sea, if heavy weather were encountered or an engine failure should occur, Yosemite would be able render assistance.

Telephone and Yosemite were reported to have passed Point Reyes, near San Francisco, on August 6, 1909, at 2:00 p.m. In September 1909, Telephone was at the shipyard of Moore & Scott, where it was undergoing modifications for ferry work. These changes included being fitted with an oil-burning power plant and extensive adaptations for ferry work. Upon completion, Telephone was expected to run between the Mission Street slip in San Francisco and the Oakland slip in half the time of the Western Pacific’s speediest ferries then in service.

In the summer of 1910, Telephone was tied up and out of service for some months before being taken out of the water at the drydock at the Union Iron Works to be painted and have its hull scraped before being returned to service.

In May 1911, it was announced that Telephone would be running as freight steamer between San Francisco and Vallejo, California, making a connection with an electric rail line, the Vallejo & Northern, to be built between Vallejo and Sacramento.

== Disposition ==
In January 1918, the machinery of the Telephone was purchased by the Port of Portland to be shipped back to Portland and installed into a new sternwheeler to be built in Portland for the port. The new vessel was the stern-wheel towboat Portland, completed in 1919. (This is not the same vessel as the existing sternwheeler Portland.)

== Legacy ==
In August 1922, George McCord announced that he would be building a twin-propeller gasoline launch 60 feet long named Camilla, with a beam of 10.7 feet. McCord stated that the design of Camilla, which would carry 50 people, was based on the lines of Telephone.
