= Olympian (sidewheeler) =

19th century inland steamship

Coordinates: 52°14′52″S 69°01′55″W

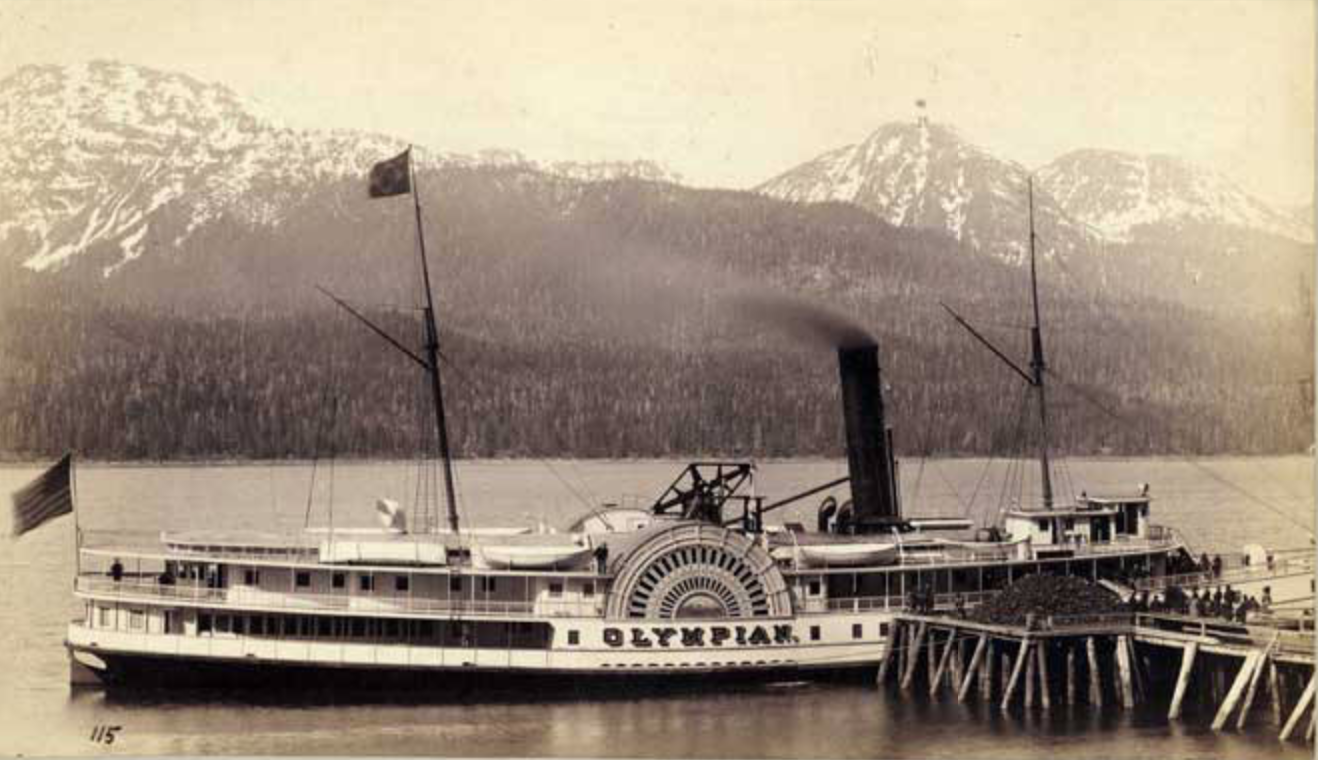
- Olympian at a dock in the Inside Passage circa 1890

History
- Name: Olympian
- Owner: Oregon Rwy & Nav. Co.
- Operator: Pacific Coast Steamship Co. (summer 1887 only)
- Route: Puget Sound, Columbia River, Inside Passage
- Builder: Harlan and Hollingsworth
- Cost: $260,000
- Launched: Aug 21, 1883
- Maiden voyage: Dec 6, 1883
- In service: 1884
- Out of service: 1891
- Identification: US #155055
- Fate: Grounded under tow, 1906

General characteristics
- Type: inland steamship
- Tonnage: 1419.60 GRT; 1083.20 RT
- Length: 261 ft (80 m) between perpendiculars; 270 ft (82 m) overall
- Beam: 40 ft (12 m) exclusive of guards
- Draft: 8.2 ft (2.5 m) when light
- Depth: 12.5 ft (3.8 m) depth of hold
- Ice class: Capable of breaking some ice.
- Installed power: Walking beam steam engine; single cylinder 70 in (180 cm) in diameter; piston stroke of 12.5 ft (3.8 m); 2100 indicated horsepower
- Propulsion: side-wheels
- Sail plan: Auxiliary schooner rig
- Speed: Max: 21 miles per hour (34 km/h) (when new).
- Capacity: 250 passengers in first class staterooms; known to have carried 900 passengers on a day excursion.
- Crew: Fifty (50)

Olympian was a large side-wheel inland steamship that operated in the Pacific Northwest and Alaska. Olympian operated from early 1884 to late 1891 on the Columbia River, Puget Sound, and the Inside Passage of British Columbia and Alaska.

Built for the Oregon Railway and Navigation Company, then controlled by Henry Villard, Olympian and its near twin Alaskan were known as “Henry Villard's White Elephants.” In 1895 they were said to have been the “most expensive and at the same time the most useless steamers yet appearing in the Northwest.”

Olympian was tried on several routes but was unable to make a profit on any of them. The steamer was tied up for good in 1892, and remained so until 1906, when it was sold to New York interests. The buyers intended to tow Olympian around South America to New York, rehabilitate it, and run it on Long Island Sound.

Zealandia towed Olympian as far as Possession Bay on the east side of the Straits of Magellan, where Olympian broke loose and washed ashore. Olympian was never removed from the beach, where some remains of the steamer could still be seen in 1980.

This Olympian should not be confused with Olympian (ex Telegraph) a wooden sternwheeler which also served on Puget Sound and on the Columbia River.

== Design and construction ==
Olympian and Alaskan followed designs which had been successful on Long Island Sound and on Chesapeake Bay but which were untested in the Pacific Northwest, where different types of inland and riverine vessels had been developed to meet local conditions.

=== Construction ===
Olympian was built by Harlan & Hollingsworth Co., of Wilmington, Delaware. The steamer cost $260,000 to build. It was launched on August 21, 1883. The steamer made its formal trial trip on November 27, 1883. On an earlier trial in November 1883, Olympian was found to be able to reach a speed of 20 miles per hour (32 km/h) on only 35 pounds steam.

Olympian was built of iron and plated with steel. The beams forward and aft of the boiler, and one beam in the forward and after holds were also of iron. The other beams and carlins in the hull were of yellow pine, with iron plate knees.

All saloons, cabins, and staterooms were lit by electricity and heated by steam. The grand saloon, which was divided into forward and after cabins by the machinery, was about 200 ft (61 m) long. Fifty staterooms, each with two large berths, opened on to the grand saloon. The dining room could accommodate 180 persons.

=== Dimensions ===
Olympian was 261 ft (80 m) long between perpendiculars, and 270 ft (82 m) long overall. The beam was 40 ft (12 m) exclusive of guards. The depth of hold was 12.5 ft (3.8 m). Olympian drew 8.2 ft (2.5 m) of water when light.

The steamboat measured out at 1419.60 gross tons and 1,083.20 registered tons. In this instance, "ton" is a unit of volume, not of weight. The official merchant vessel registry number was 155055.

Fifty men comprised the Olympian’s crew in May 1884. Captain Thomas F. Wilson was the master of the vessel in May 1884.

== Engineering ==
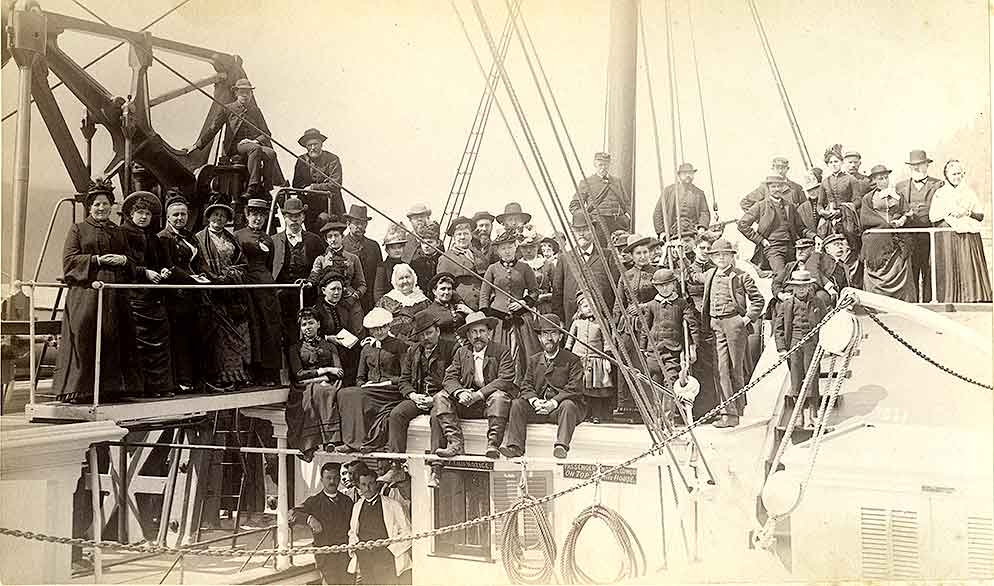
Passengers posing on upper deck of Olympian; walking beam can be seen on left.

Olympian was driven by a single “vertical surface” condensing walking beam steam engine, with a cylinder 70 in (180 cm) in diameter and a piston stroke of 12.5 ft (3.8 m). A small auxiliary steam engine assisted in starting the main engine. The main plant developed 2,100 indicated horsepower on the steamer's formal trial trip, riving the vessel at 21 miles per hour (34 km/h) on 45 pounds steam.

There were two large main coal-fired boilers which generated steam at 45 pounds working pressure for the main engine. Each boiler was about 20 ft (6.1 m) long, 12 ft (3.7 m) in diameter, and weighed about 7,000 pounds (3,200 kg).

Auxiliary machinery and an auxiliary boiler powered the fire pump and the dynamo. The vessel was illuminated throughout by electricity, 250 lights installed by Edison Incandescent Electric Light Co.

The paddle wheels were of the composite-radial type, 32 ft (9.8 m) in diameter, fitted with wooden paddle buckets with an 11 ft 3 in (3.4 m) face. Olympian had an auxiliary sailing rig as a two-masted schooner.

== Transit to west coast ==
On December 6, 1883, Olympian departed Wilmington bound for Puget Sound. Officers in charge of the vessel on the voyage to the west coast were H.S. Ackley, captain; W.S. Theater, first officer; John Dixon (b.1850), second officer; Andrew Hill, third officer; Puxley, chief engineer; John S. Kidd, first assistant; Barnard, second assistant; Marcey, third assistant; and Mr. Smith, chief steward.

Olympian reached St. Thomas in the West Indies on December 15, 1883. The captain reported that the steamer was running well at 12 miles per hour (19 km/h). Olympian arrived in Valparaiso, Chile on February 2, 1884. Olympian reached San Francisco on March 3, 1884.

== Suitability problems ==
Olympian had difficulty loading coal. Wheelbarrows had to be used at Seattle because the steamer was too big to use the coal chutes. The only alternative was a larger facility in Victoria, but Victoria had difficulty keeping enough coal on hand for Olympian. Talk was that the old steamer Isabel (446 GT), long out of service in Gig Harbor, W.T., would be taken to British Columbia to carry coal to Victoria from mines at Nanaimo, BC mainly to supply Olympian.

Olympian drew much more water than other steamers on the Columbia River, and as a result the large steamer was essentially limited to the run on the lower Columbia from Portland to Astoria.

When Olympian arrived in Puget Sound, no dry dock or other facility existed in Oregon or Washington large enough to accommodate the vessel for repair. Oregon Rwy and Nav. Co. planned to steam the vessel south to San Francisco, California to be placed on a dry dock for repairs, including hull scrapping, caulking, and repainting. This had to be done with careful regard for bad weather, because Olympian had not been built as an ocean-going vessel.

When the time came in March 1885 for Olympian to dry dock in San Francisco, its insurance carriers threatened by telegram to cancel their $260,000 policy on the steamer if the extensions of the main deck, called “guards”, outboard from the edge of actual hull, were not removed before beginning the voyage to San Francisco. Removal and replacement would cost at least $1,000.

By the summer of 1891, there was a gridiron at Olympia, Washington which could accommodate Olympian. This was just a few months before the end of the steamer's active service life.

== Puget Sound service 1884-1885 ==
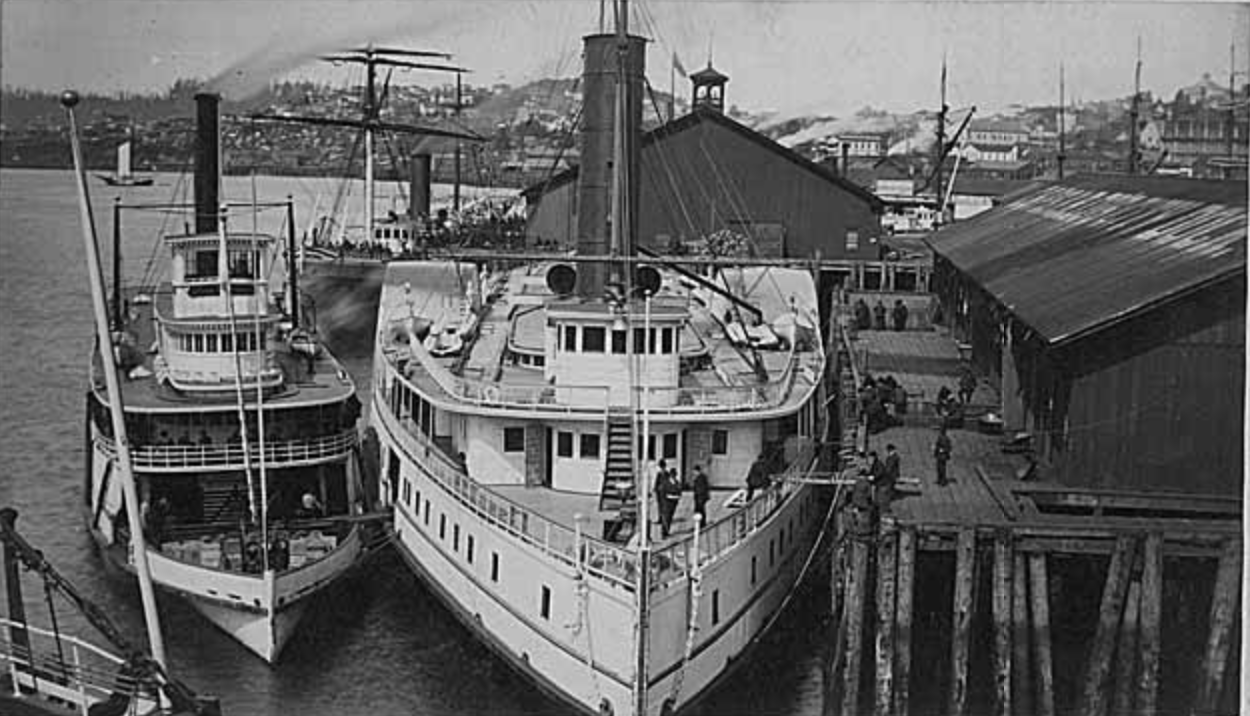
This photograph, taken in Seattle, well shows the huge size of Olympian (1420 GT) on right, compared to Emma Hayward (616 GT) on left.

Olympian arrived at Union wharf in Port Townsend, W.T. on the afternoon of Friday, March 7, 1884. The voyage of about 16,000 miles (26,000 km) had taken 92 days, and allowing for 9 days stopping in various ports en route, the steamer would have averaged about 193 miles (311 km) per day.

Two OR&N officials, Superintendent Frank T. Dodge, and Captain C.E. Clancy, of its Puget Sound division, inspected the vessel upon its arrival and found it sound. According to the Tacoma Ledger, thirteen stowaways arrived on the Olympian. Most of them boarded the steamer at Valparaiso.

=== Tacoma-Victoria run ===
Olympian was expected to be able to make the 140 mile run between Tacoma, W.T. and Victoria, B.C. in eight hours, including stops en route. Captain Wilson, then in command of the inland sidewheeler North Pacific (488 GT), and his purser, would be shifted over to be in charge of Olympian.

Newspapers reported the officers to operate Olympian on Puget Sound would be the popular Capt. Thomas F. Wilson, then in charge of North Pacific, George Roberts, first officer, Mr. Pugsley, chief engineer, and C.H. Warren, purser. The crew of George E. Starr (473 GT) would be transferred to North Pacific, and the crew of Welcome (327 GT) would be assigned to George E. Starr.

Olympian arrived in Victoria, BC on the afternoon of March 25, 1884 from Port Townsend, taking two and one quarter hours to cover the distance between the two cities. A crowd turned out at Victoria to view the new steamer.

By May 1, 1884, Olympian, under Captain Wilson, was operating on a daily route between Tacoma and Victoria, stopping at Seattle and other way points. In early August 1884, OR&N advertised a reduction in its passenger fares to Victoria on Olympian and North Pacific, to $4, or $5 round trip.

=== Withdrawn from service September 1884 ===
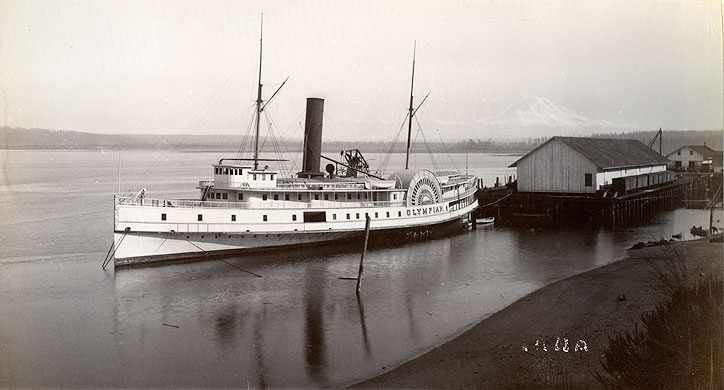
Olympian withdrawn from service in Tacoma.

In September 1884 Olympian was taken out of service for lack of business. Olympian's place on the Victoria route would be taken by OR&N's George E. Starr running in competition with Eliza Anderson (276 GT). Both Starr and Anderson were wooden-hulled side-wheelers. Both were older (in the case of the Anderson, much older), smaller, and slower than Olympian. Starr required an hour more than Olympian to complete the Victoria run. Even so, this competition forced down fares.

It was reported that the government of Brazil, which operated its own steamer lines, had made an offer to purchase both Olympian and Alaskan to operate on the Amazon River. OR&N was reported to have been asking $700,000 for both vessels.

As of May 5, 1885, Olympian had been tied up to a dock in Tacoma for some months according to one report, or a year, according to another report.

=== Repair in San Francisco May 1885 ===
Olympian went to San Francisco for dry docking, departing Tacoma at 1:00 p.m. on Tuesday, May 12, 1885. The next day, Wednesday, May 13, Olympian cleared the customs house at Port Townsend, W.T. at daylight, and passed Cape Flattery, turning southbound at 11:00 a.m. Olympian returned to the Puget Sound area in late May 1885.

=== Return to service summer 1885 ===
Olympian resumed Puget Sound service in the summer of 1885. In July it was able to make fast time between Tacoma and Seattle, taking about one hour and thirty-five minutes on an average of 37 pounds steam pressure, less than the 45 pounds maximum allowed.

=== Dock collision in Seattle ===
On June 4, 1885, at 1:30 a.m., coming in for a landing at Seattle, the mate in charge miscalculated the distance and Olympian smashed into the dock. The supporting pilings were carried away and part of the building on the dock was demolished, for a total dock damage of about $3,000. Olympian sustained $4,000 worth of damage, from the bow back to the pilot house.

== Columbia River service 1886 ==
On the morning of January 18, 1886, Olympian arrived at Astoria en route to Portland. John Miller Murphy, publisher of The Washington Leader, of Olympia, W.T., commented on the transfer to the Columbia:

The “Boston” Company has taken the twin-elephant, the steamer Olympian, around to the Columbia river. They now have two colossal monuments of Villard's folly to grace the granite foundation of the "Castle in Spain," in the Webfoot metropolis, which was to have eclipsed all modern hotels. The Alaskan has occupied the boneyard the past three years, where her consort will now probably be permanently moored.

In January 1886, a severe snowstorm stranded passenger trains in the Columbia Gorge and also froze the Columbia River. Relief trains could not reach the stranded passengers and wooden-hulled steamboats could not navigate the ice-choked river. Olympian however had an iron hull, and on January 27, it was used to smash through the ice and rescue the passengers.

Olympian worked on the Portland-Astoria-Ilwaco run during the summer of 1886, serving vacationers and tourists. Olympian made its fastest time on this run under Capt. Lester A. Bailey, from Portland to Astoria in four hours and 47 minutes. Olympian's rival on this route was the popular crack side-wheelerT.J. Potter, which was less expensive to operate. Mostly Olympian was unsuccessful, being too expensive and not much faster than its wooden-hulled chief rivals, T.J. Potter and the express sternwheeler Telephone.

== Alaskan operations summer 1887 ==
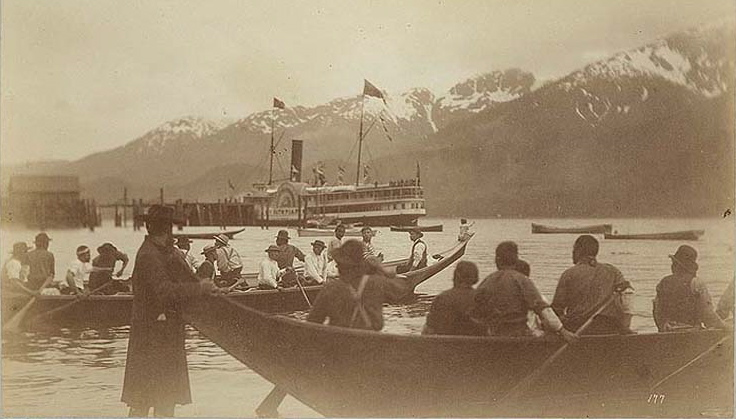
Olympian in Alaska, summer 1887. Tlingit people shown in foreground.

In 1887, unable to earn money from Olympian on either the Seattle-Victoria run or on the Columbia River, OR&N chartered out Olympian to Pacific Coast Steamship Co. to run summer excursions to Alaska through the Inside Passage. Olympian did not do well on the Inside Passage, being too lightly built for its conditions, which were much more challenging than Chesapeake Bay for which the vessel was designed and best suited.

=== Preparation work ===
In February and March 1887 Olympian was being overhauled, and additional staterooms were being installed, to prepare the steamer for service to Alaska to begin at the end of May, under the command of Capt. James Carroll.

Olympian departed Astoria on Wednesday, April 6, 1887, bound for San Francisco for further preparation work. Off Coos Bay Olympian encountered a storm which lasted for fourteen hours. The steamer sustained damage, and had to seek assistance from the nearby ocean-going steamship Oregon. With difficulty the damage was repaired, and Olympian was able to reach San Francisco. This incident occurred in the same coastal area where Alaskan would be sunk in a storm two years later.

=== Inside Passage service ===
Olympian soon returned to the Pacific Northwest under Captain Carroll, reaching Port Townsend on Sunday night, April 17, 1887, proceeding on to Seattle at 3:00 a.m. the next morning. Olympian departed Seattle for Alaska on noon April 20, 1887. Olympian returned to Port Townsend from Alaska on April 30, 1887. On May 26, 1887, Olympian arrived at Tacoma seventy-four hours out of Sitka, Alaska, the fastest time on record.

A day or two before August 23, 1887, Olympian arrived at Port Townsend from points in southern Puget Sound with a small number of passengers, for its last trip to Alaska. It was said that the steamer lost $30,000 during the course of its summer Alaska operations.

=== Temporary excursion work in Puget Sound ===
In June 1887, in an interruption of its Alaskan operations that summer, Olympian was advertising for excursion business out of Seattle.

== Puget Sound service 1887-1891 ==
Starting October 24, 1887, OR&N ran Olympian on daily round trips (except Sunday) on the Tacoma-Port Townsend-Victoria route.

Olympian had always been advertised as a fast luxury vessel. Even so, a day or two before November 18, 1887, Olympian was three hours late out of Seattle to Port Townsend, carrying 1,000 hogs bound for Victoria.

On March 26, 1888, Olympian made its fastest time yet between Seattle and Tacoma, one hour and 22 minutes. This was just three minutes behind the best time of the sidewheeler T.J. Potter, one of the fastest, if not the fastest, steamers on Puget Sound at the time.

=== Dry docked at Esquimalt December 1888 ===
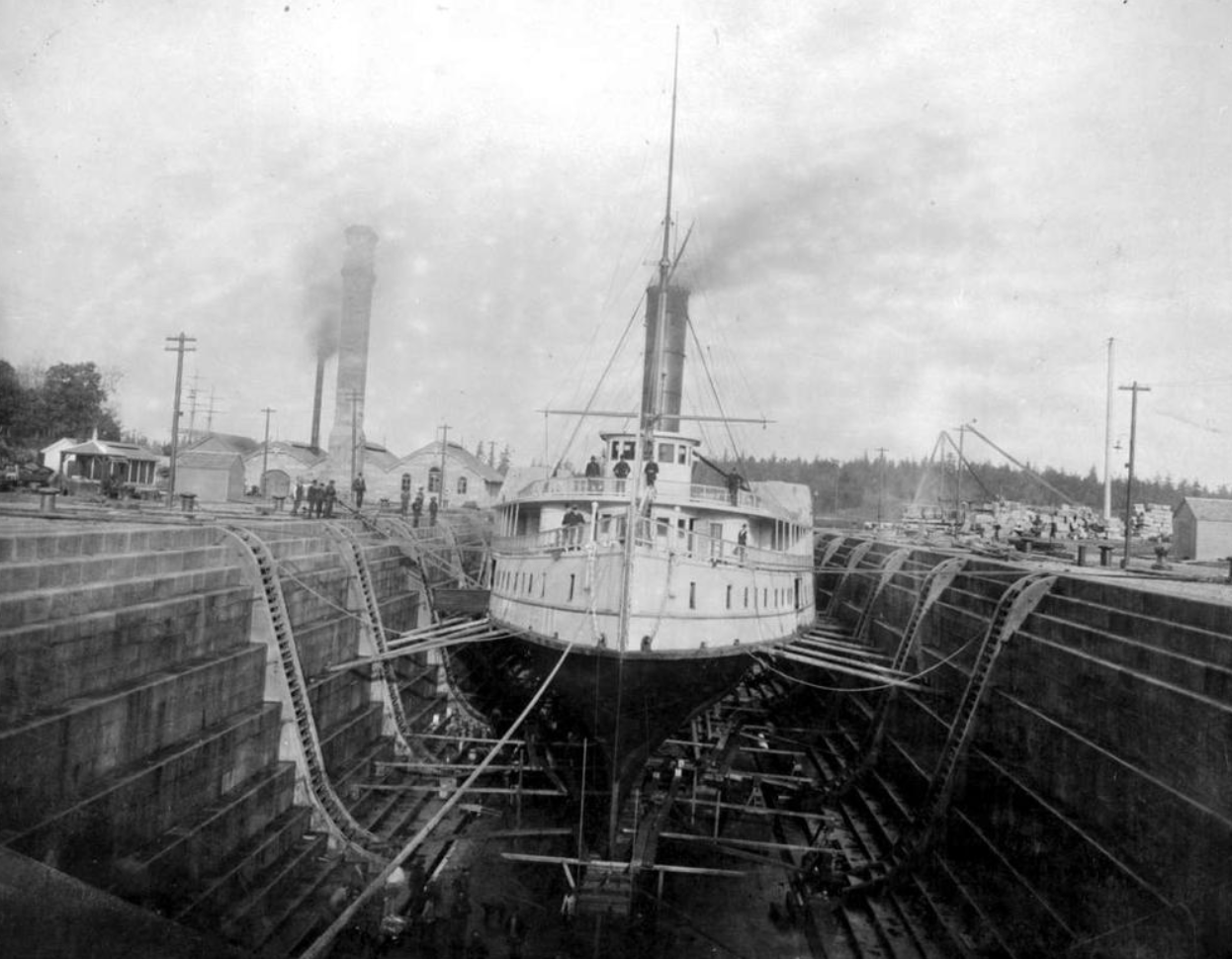
Olympian at the dry dock in Esquimalt, BC.

On Sunday, December 16, 1888, Olympian was placed in the dry dock at Esquimalt, British Columbia to have the hull scraped clean of marine growth which impeded its speed. It was difficult to get the steamer into the drydock; part of the paddle box on one side had to be removed. The Esquimalt dry dock was chosen as the better alternative to running the steamer south to San Francisco. The work on the steamer required 125 men, and was estimated to cost $4,000.

=== Fire in Port Townsend January 1889 ===
On January 17, 1889, fire broke out in the business district of Port Townsend. Olympian was at the port at the time, and Capt. George Roberts lent the fire fighters the steamer's fire hose, which helped keep the damage from getting worse.

=== Labor disputes ===
In early March 1889, the employees of the OR&N's Puget Sound Steamers went out on strike. Olympian arrived in Seattle from Victoria on March 6, 1889, at 1:00 p.m., and left for Tacoma at 6:45 p.m. According to one report, Olympian’s officers had express their intent to strike as soon as the steamer reached Tacoma. The strike ended the next day, and all boats of OR&N except T.J. Potter were running again.

In May 1890 waiters on all Puget Sound steamers, including Olympian, went out on strike, seeking an increase in their wages from $25 to $30 per month.

=== Racing steamboats 1889 ===
In late May 1889, Olympian was laid up for a general overhaul as well as installation of a new boiler and new paddle wheels. Olympian was back in service by July 4, 1889, when it raced Islander to Victoria. Olympian raced against State of Washington on July 25, 1889. Olympian also engaged in a rather absurd race against the much smaller Fleetwood (135 GT):

[T]he little steamer Fleetwood had raced the big Olympian all the way from Seattle to Tacoma. Both vessels left Seattle at the same time, and the Olympian was only 50 yards (46 m) ahead when they arrived in Tacoma. Seeing the race, a reporter for a Tacoma newspaper observed that it resembled a test of speed between a whale and a herring.

=== General overhaul 1891 ===
In January 1891, travel was reportedly very light on Puget Sound, with more boats than were needed. There had been talk that Olympian had not been profitable for some time, and that the company was saving money by not operating the steamer until trade picked up.

OR&N decided to use the lull in business to have repairs done to Olympian. Initially the plan was to have Olympian taken to Portland for the work. OR&N ruled out Esquimalt dry-dock for the work, saying that it had received "shabby treatment" when dry dock had taken in another vessel, apparently in greater need of repair, ahead of Olympian.

The trip to Portland did not come off because Olympian’s insurers demanded too high a premium to insure the vessel during the voyage. OR&N then decided to use the dry dock at Esquimalt, but this does not seem to have occurred either, as Olympian was still moored up at Seattle and in need of repair in late February 1891, with OR&N reported to be still undecided as to where to have the work done.

=== Bellingham route September 1891 ===
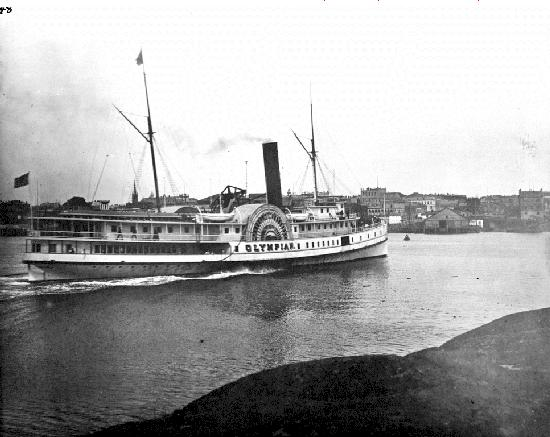
Olympian arriving in Victoria, BC.

On August 23, 1891, Olympian carried 900 people from Victoria to Seattle on a day excursion organized by the Odd Fellows of Victoria.

For a short time in September 1891, Olympian was placed on the Seattle-Bellingham route, departing Seattle daily (except Monday) at 8:00 a.m. Olympian did not last long on the Bellingham run, being taken off after just five days because the business on the route did not pay the expenses of so large a vessel.

Olympian was returned to the Victoria route, with an excursion was scheduled to be run on October 1, and carrying fifty tons of wheat to Victoria on October 2.

=== Near mutiny October 1891 ===
A major dispute, in full view of the passengers, broke out among the officers and crew of the Olympian just after the steamer had left Victoria on October 20, 1891.

According to the first assistant engineer, Henry F. Smith (b.1859), the deckhands had gotten in the habit of using the fire hose to wash off the decks. In the past the carelessness of the deck crew had resulted in the fire hose being inoperable for several hours, depriving the vessel of fire protection.

When Smith attempted to forbid the a deckhand from using the firehose on this occasion, a dispute broke out, which led to the exchange of strong words and fighting between the deck crew and the engineering staff. Reportedly Captain A. N. McAlpine had drawn his pistol on Smith when Smith had threatened him during the course of the dispute. When Olympian reached Seattle, the entire engineering department, except the Chief Engineer, walked out on strike, seventeen men in all.

The affair was investigated by the U.S. Steamboat Inspection Service. As a result, the license of first assistant engineer Smith was revoked for insubordination which nearly led to a mutiny, and the licenses of a number of other officers, including Captain McAlpine, were suspended for thirty days for failure to keep order on their vessel, among other things.

Hard feelings persisted between McAlpine and the engineers, who, after McAlpine's license suspension had expired, refused to serve under him on Olympian. Probably to calm things down on Olympian, McAlpine was reassigned to the older, smaller and slower sidewheeler Sehome. This did not improve matters for McAlpine, as Sehome's engineers also refused to work under him. One source reports that “the difficulty was not adjusted until every steamer of any prominence on Puget Sound was tied up.” The pilot and the engineer unions were at odds with each other, and it took some time to settle their differences.

Both McAlpine and Henry F. Smith, the first assistant engineer, were recorded as having gained “considerable notoriety” as a result of this incident.

=== Collision and sinking of Virgil T. Price ===
Olympian collided with the tug Virgil T. Price at 8:50 p.m. on December 6, 1891, in Seattle. Olympian, running under Captain Ole A. Anderson, was coming to the City dock, but somehow veered into the coal bunkers at Colman Dock, at the foot of Madison Street.

Precisely how the accident happened was not immediately clear, but it seemed that the wind had shifted and carried the Olympian straight into the Virgil T. Price at a speed of about four miles per hour (6.4 km/h), breaking two floating saw logs and cutting the Price completely in two. The only man on Price, a watchman, narrowly escaped with his life.

The collision also seriously damaged the coal bunkers. Virgil Price was worth about $8,000, and was insured for $4,000 Olympian sustained no appreciable damage.

== Later years ==
=== Transfer to Portland January 1892 ===
In January 1892, Olympian was sent around from Puget Sound to Portland for repairs. The boilers were in poor condition and probably needed replacement. The work was expected to cost $20,000. The steamer was in Portland by January 14, 1892, when its crew had returned to Seattle.

=== Out of service 1892-1906 ===
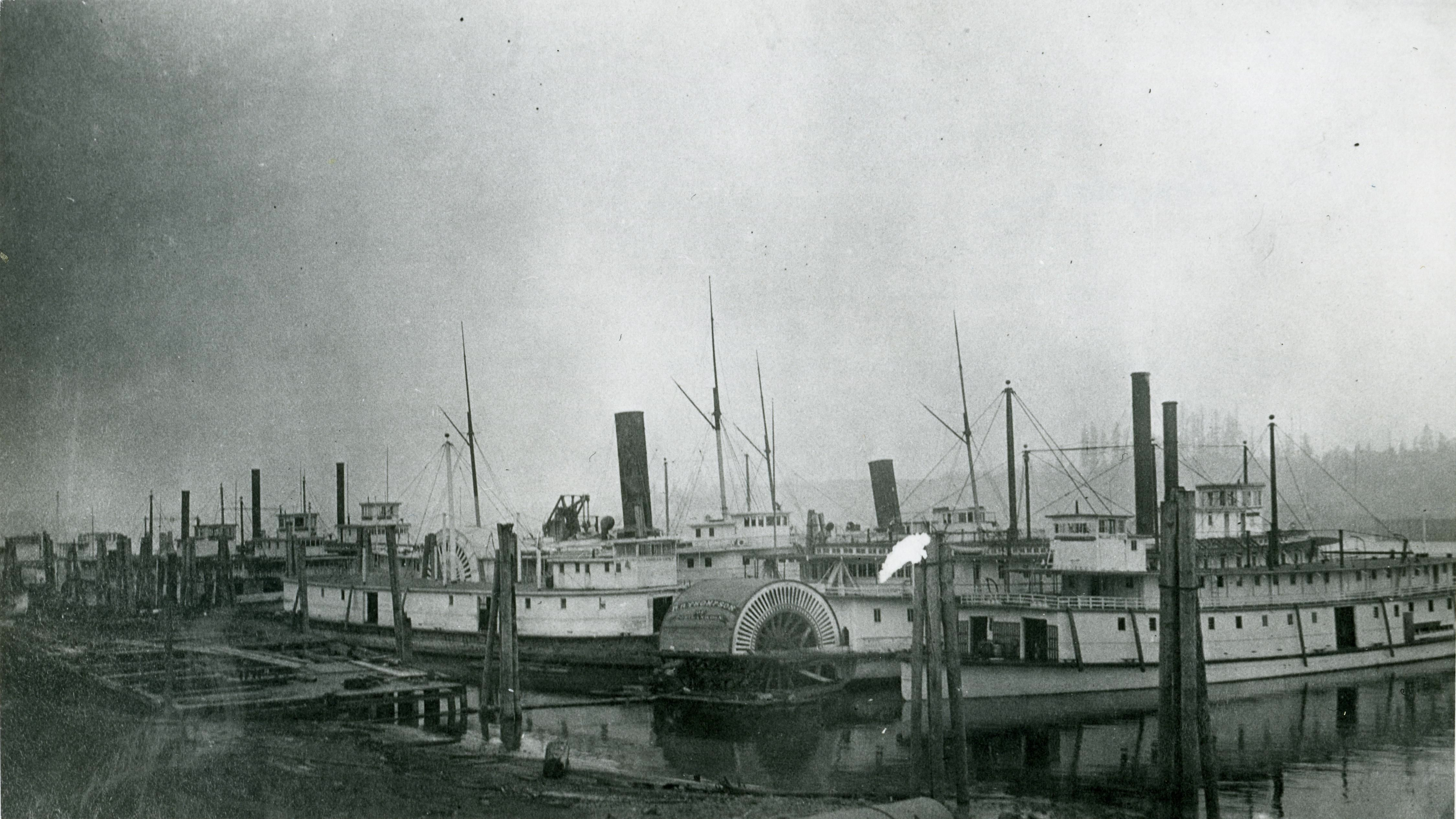
Olympian and Alaskan (steamers with schooner rigs, tall chimneys and walking beams) laid up in Portland, Oregon sometime before May 1889, at the OR&N steamboat boneyard.

After Olympian arrived in Portland in January 1892, it was never used again. No boiler replacement ever occurred.

In 1895 expensive furnishings from Olympian, the armchairs, settees, and lounges, were installed in the OR&N's Columbia river sternwheeler R.R. Thompson.

In 1897 the Klondike Gold Rush created a demand for marine transportation to Alaskan ports such as Skagway, Alaska, from which the gold fields could be reached. In July 1897 there was talk that Olympian and Victorian which had been lying idle for years in Portland, could be placed into the Alaska service.

The Oregon Railway & Navigation Company had a facility in north Portland, on the Willamette River, called the "boneyard." The boneyard was used to store boats not needed for service, repair steamers to return to service, or to scrap or salvage vessels which were no longer useful.

In February 1904 Olympian had been lying unused in the boneyard for over ten years. By that time Olympian was useless as a steamer. The steamer was obsolescent, the boilers were of no value, and it still remained too expensive to operate. The hull was thought to be the most valuable part of the boat.

== Wrecked in South America ==
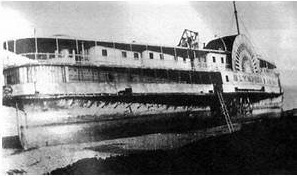
Olympian wrecked in Possession Bay, 1906.

In December 1905, OR&N sold Olympian to C.L.Dimon, of New York City. The purchase price was said to be around $30,000. Dimon planned to have Olympian towed around South America to New York, there to be renovated and returned to service as an excursion steamer. Reportedly Dimon intended to spend $100,000 in New York to recondition the steamer.

On January 19, 1906, Olympian was brought up the Willamette River from the boneyard to the Willamette Iron and Steel Works to prepare for the trip around South America through the Straits of Magellan. This would be the longest tow in the maritime history of the United States.

Olympian left Portland under tow on January 20, 1906, with Captain Wise and eleven crewmen on board. Before leaving in tow, heavy timber bracing was installed inside the steamer, and the sides of the vessel were covered over with rough lumber. Reportedly the paddlewheels were also removed, but this cannot have been so, as photographs taken after Olympian was wrecked show the wheels still in place.

While in tow of Zealandia, Olympian went aground in Possession Bay. Olympian ended up laying broadside on the beach embedded in gravel to a depth of 3 ft (1 m).

The estimated cost of salvaging Olympian was $17,500, an amount which it was thought would lead the owners to abandon the vessel. The owners of Olympian contracted with a local salvor to refloat the vessel for £3,500 ($17,000) on a “no cure, no pay” basis. The salvors expended £1,300 ($6,300), and then refused to proceed any further unless they were paid that amount. The owners refused to pay, and ordered Zealandia, which had been standing by, to proceed on alone if Olympian were not brought off the beach in five days. When that did not happen, Zealandia departed, leaving a few men on Olympian to protect the owners’ interest in the vessel. Olympian eventually was abandoned. Its remains could be seen as late as 1980, and the wreck remains visible on satellite imaging.
