= San Rafael (steamboat) =

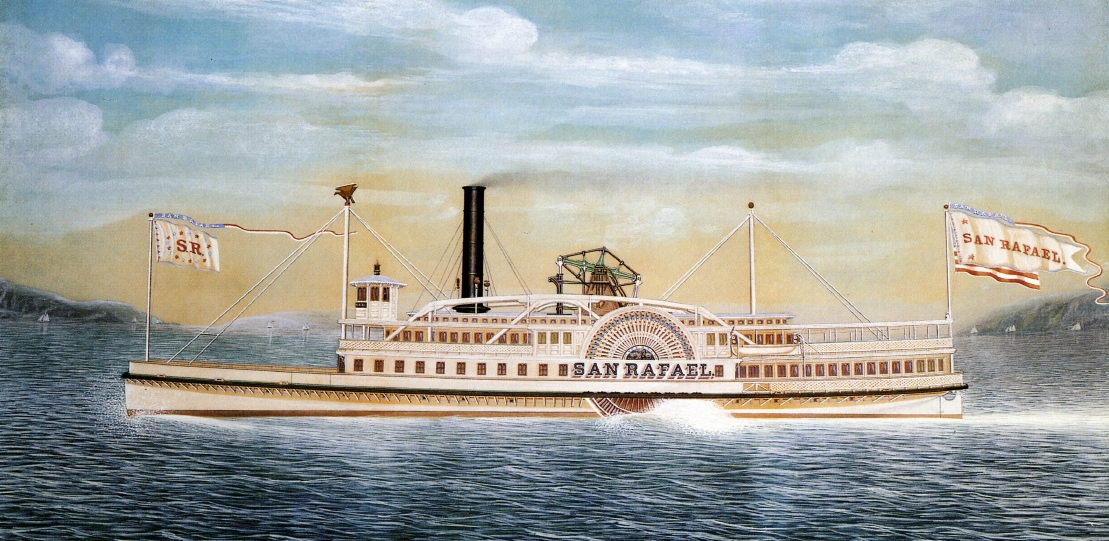
- San Rafael as built in 1878 (oil on canvas by James Bard).

History
- Name: San Rafael
- Route: San Francisco Bay
- Builder: Benjamin C. Terry
- Cost: $150,000
- Laid down: 1877 (assembly of pre-manufactured components began)
- In service: 1878
- Out of service: 1901
- Fate: Sank as result of collision, November 30, 1901.
- Notes: near twin of steamer Saucelito built at same time.

General characteristics
- Type: inland boat passenger/freighter, wooden hull
- Tonnage: 692 gross / 401 net
- Length: 205.5 ft (62.64 m) on keel, 220 ft (67.06 m) overall
- Beam: 32 ft (9.75 m)
- Depth: 9.75 ft (3 m) depth of hold
- Installed power: vertical beam steam engine; cylinder bore 50 inches (127.00 cm); stroke 132 inches (335.28 cm)
- Propulsion: sidewheels

San Rafael was a steamboat that operated on San Francisco Bay from 1878 to 1901. The components of the vessel and a sistership were manufactured in Brooklyn then shipped to San Francisco where the ships were assembled. San Rafael remained in service, primarily as a ferry, until the vessel was sunk in a collision with a ferry on November 30, 1901. Although San Rafael sank rapidly, quick action by the crews limited the loss of life to five persons or fewer. Subsequent litigation established negligence on the part of both captains as the cause of the collision.

== Design and construction ==
San Rafael and a sistership, Saucelito were built to the same specifications in components at Greenpoint, New York, now a part of Brooklyn. The builder was Benjamin C. Terry. The components were then shipped to the west coast either by rail or ship. Terry himself traveled west to supervise the assembly of the vessels. Once complete, San Raphael was said by a newspaper, the San Francisco Call, to be "by far the prettiest boat that ever cleft the waters of San Francisco Bay". Both vessels were built as shallow draft-steamboats, which required a light-weight hull. To strengthen the hull, these vessels were built with a "hog truss", a bridge-like structure arching fore-and-aft along both sides the vessel with the function of stiffening the hull.

== Operations ==
San Rafael and Saucelito both ran for the San Francisco and Sausalito ferry line, and were classified as ferries, even though neither was a double-ender. They were considered to be well-fitted and very speedy. Sausalito burned 1884 at the San Quentin wharf. By 1901, San Rafael was probably the last California steamboat in operation to have been built with the hog truss.

== Wreck ==
San Rafael sank near Alcatraz Island on November 30, 1901, following a collision in the fog with the steam ferry Sausalito. Both vessels were owned by the same company, the North Pacific Coast Railroad. San Rafael was bound across San Francisco Bay, from San Francisco to Sausalito. Both vessels were proceeding slowly and ringing fog bells. Both captains realized the other ship was near, and had ordered the engines reversed, but it was too late to prevent a collision. Sausalito struck San Rafael broadside and penetrated ten feet into the dining room, then occupied by many passengers. Prompt action by the captains of the two vessels, in lashing the ships together, kept San Rafael afloat long enough for most of the passengers and crew to evacuate to Sausalito. A boiler explosion on San Rafael was averted when a fireman went into the fireroom, then neck-deep in water, and opened a valve to bleed off the steam in the boilers. Twenty minutes after the collision, San Rafael sank in around 120 feet of water. This sinking is said to have inspired Jack London in writing the opening scenes of his novel The Sea Wolf. The captain of San Rafael, John Tayler Mackenzie, was the last person to leave the sinking vessel.

== Aftermath ==
It was hard to determine how many people had been lost. Initial rumors were that 20 or even 100 people or more had drowned. It was only until everyone had gone home and a careful count could be made that it was concluded that only five(or three) had died. A board of inquiry found that both captains were at fault for failure to properly sound fog signals, and the licenses of both were suspended. Captain Mackenzie's license was reinstated by January 1902. He received a testimonial signed by 650 people as to his courage in the San Rafael disaster. The wreck location was not precisely known until December 14, 1901, when it was reached by a diver. Salvage efforts were begun but abandoned. In the course of these operations, the wreck was dragged along the bottom, but the precise final location was not recorded. Twenty years later, in July, 1921, the anchor line of the liner Matsonia became entangled with the wreckage of the machinery, requiring the assistance of two tugs to free the ship. Legal action against the North Pacific Coast Railway Company led to judgments against the company for negligence.

== See also ==
Ferries of San Francisco Bay
