= T. J. Potter =

19th century American paddle steamer

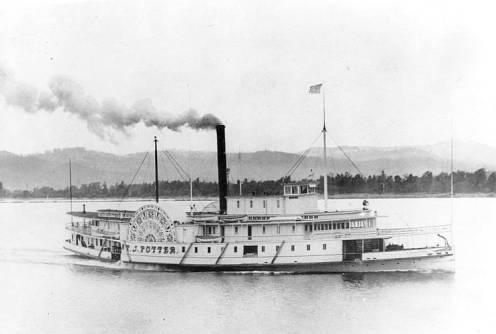
- T.J. Potter

History
- Name: T.J. Potter
- Owner: Oregon Railway and Navigation Company
- Route: Columbia River, Puget Sound
- Builder: Oregon Railway and Navigation Company
- Launched: May 29, 1888
- In service: 1888
- Out of service: 1921
- Fate: Abandoned, Northeast shore of Youngs Bay, near Astoria
- Notes: Reconstructed in 1901

General characteristics
- Type: Inland steamship
- Tonnage: Before rebuild gross tonnage 650 tons, net tonnage 590 tons. After rebuild gross tonnage 1017 tons, net tonnage 826 tons.
- Length: 230 ft (70.1 m); after reconstruction: 234 ft (71.3 m)
- Beam: 35 ft (10.7 m)
- Depth: 10.5 ft (3.2 m) depth of hold
- Decks: three (freight, passenger, boat)
- Installed power: steam engine
- Propulsion: sidewheels

The T.J. Potter was a paddle steamer that operated in the Northwestern United States. The boat was launched in 1888. Her upper cabins came from the steamboat Wide West. This required some modification, because the T.J. Potter was a side-wheeler, whereas the Wide West had been a stern-wheeler. The boat's first owner was the Oregon Railway and Navigation Company. The T. J. Potter was one of the few side-wheeler boats that operated on the Columbia River.

== Design and construction ==
The T.J. Potter, commonly referred to as the Potter, was named after first the vice president of the Union Pacific Railroad's operations in the west. She was built entirely of wood by the Oregon Railway and Navigation Company, owned by John F. Steffan. She was built for the Oregon Railway and Navigation Company. She was launched at Portland, Oregon in 1888. She was propelled by two non-condensing steam engines, with 32" cylinders, each with an eight-foot stroke, and generating (together or singly is not certain) 1,700 horsepower. Her single boiler and firebox were built in 1887 by the Pusey & Jones Company, of Wilmington, Delaware. The boiler was 32 feet (9.8 m) long with a diameter of 84 inches (2,100 mm). Her gross tonnage was 659 and her net tonnage was 589. As built, the Potter was 230 feet (70 m) long, with a beam of 35 feet (11 m), and depth of hold of 10 1/2 feet. Her U.S. registry number was 145489.

Construction of the Potter was supervised by Capt. James William Troup, one of the most famous steamboat captains in the West, as well as the owner of the Oregon Railway and Navigation Company, the builders of the T. J. Potter. On May 26, 1888, the same year the Potter was built, Captain Troup had brought the sternwheeler Hassalo over a six-mile (10 km) stretch of rapids called the Cascades of the Columbia during low water, reaching speeds of 50 miles (80 km) an hour in the process.

When built, the Potter had a reputation as one of the fastest and most luxurious steamboats in the Pacific Northwest:

[T]he T.J. Potter was the final step in the evolution of the side-wheeler—230 feet long, 33 feet (10 m) beam, with grace and beauty in every inch of her. The T. J. Potter was intended to be the last word in the elegance then incorporated into steamboat design. Even the paddle-wheels were decorated with intricate designs. Where those of the lesser side-wheelers were pierced by simple fan designs, hers were jigsawed into an intricate floral pattern that made them works of Victorian art. A divided, curving staircase led up to the grand saloon, and her passengers could observe themselves ascending it in the plate glass mirror, which was the largest in that part of the West. Colored sunlight from the stained glass windows of the clerestory gleamed on soft carpeting and the mellowed wood and ivory of a grand piano.

== Operations on the Columbia River ==
The first season after she was launched, her owners put her on the tourist run from Portland to Astoria, Oregon. In August 1888, the Potter made the run from Portland to Astoria in 5 hours and 31 minutes. By comparison, the fastest steamboat on the Columbia River at that time was the Potter's competitor Telephone, which on July 2, 1887, had made the 105-mile (169 km) run from Portland to Astoria in 4 hours and 34 minutes. Fares were $2.50 to Astoria and $3.00 to Ilwaco, Washington. Discounts were offered for the roundtrip. Lower berths cost $.75 and a single berth cost $.50. All meals also cost $.50.

== Operations on Puget Sound ==
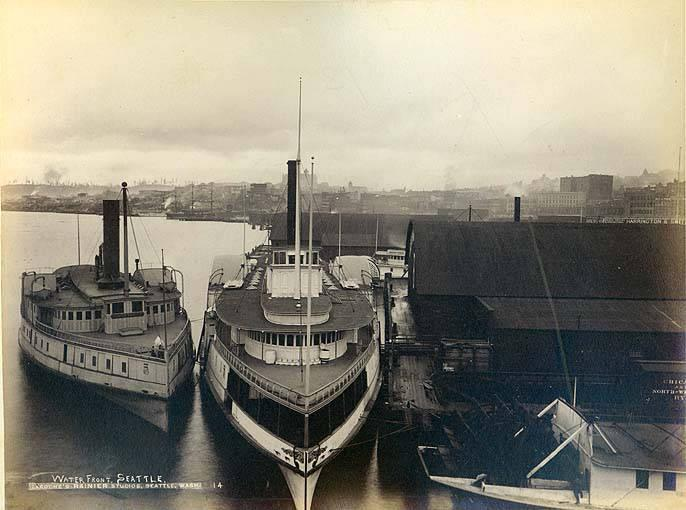
T.J. Potter in center, with smaller sidewheel steamer North Pacific on left, at Seattle, Washington, 1891

After that, she was transferred to Puget Sound to compete with another famous steamboat, the Bailey Gatzert, which was owned by the Seattle Steam Navigation and Transportation Company. The Bailey was a stern-wheeler, and did better in the Sound than the sidewheeler Potter, which rolled from side to side in swells, raising first one paddle wheel then the other out of the water.

Even so, the T.J. Potter was one of the fastest steamboats on Puget Sound, and is reported in 1890 to have bested the famous sternwheeler Bailey Gatzert in a race. The Potter was also reported to have set a record time of 82 minutes on the run from Seattle to Tacoma. While operating out of Puget Sound, the Potter, along with many other local steamboats, helped fight the Great Seattle Fire of 1889:

The mighty T.J. Potter foamed up from Vancouver Island with a Canadian fire engine, the chief of the Victoria fire department, and 22 firemen. Fire was licking the docks so the Victoria fire company went to work where it landed.

== Return to Columbia River ==
Eventually the Potter was transferred back to the Columbia River for good. She was placed on the Portland-Astoria run, where she competed with steamboats owned by the Shaver Transportation Company. The Potter's owners, Oregon Railway and Navigation Company, struck an anti-competitive deal with Shaver Transportation, whereby the Shaver boats, including the Sarah Dixon, would stay off the Portland-Astoria route in return for a monthly subsidy from Oregon Railway and Navigation Company. Other competitors of the Potter on the Portland-Astoria run included Lurline and Georgiana.

== Captain and crew ==
In 1901, Joe Turner was the captain of the T.J. Potter. Other crew at apparently the same time, but whose positions are uncertain, included Al Gray (Faber, cited below, identifies Gray as captain), Julius Oliver, James Healey, Harry O. Staples, Ed Scott, Fred Ware, Claude Cooper, Wendell Smith, and Henry Hoffman.

== 1901 Rebuild ==
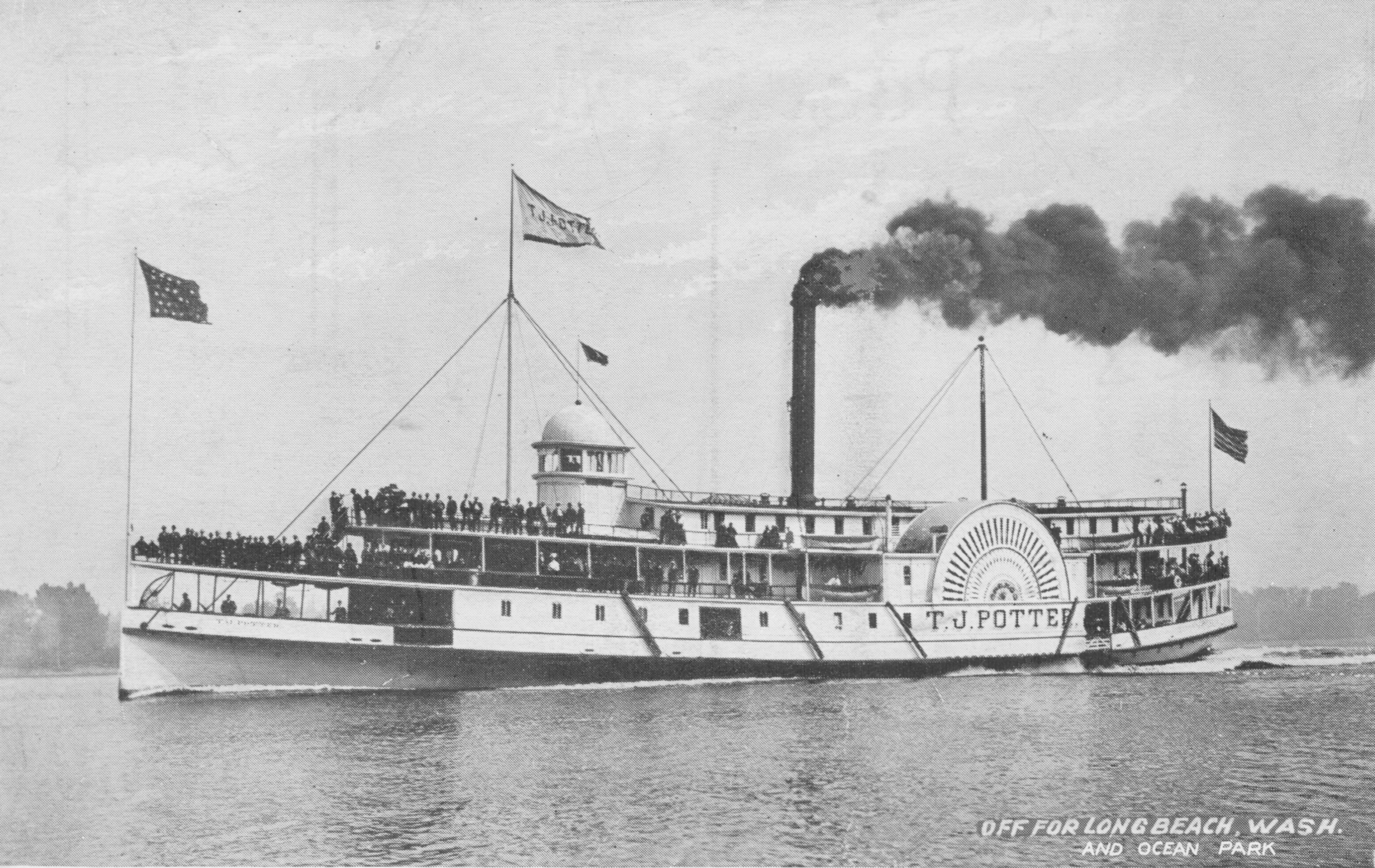
T.J. Potter following reconstruction in 1901.

In 1901 the Potter was rebuilt, increasing her length by only a few feet but greatly increasing her weight. Her gross tonnage rose from 650 to 1017 tons, and her net tonnage from 590 to 826. The increased weight cut several knots off her speed. Her wheelhouse was rebuilt, and instead of a flat roof, she had a dome with a flagpole. This was unique among Columbia River steamboats. The rebuild cost a total of $86,000.

Following the rebuild, the Potter's owners put her on the run from Portland to Ilwaco, Washington for connection with the narrow-gauge Ilwaco Railway and Navigation Company, serving primarily the summer tourist trade.

== Later years and abandonment ==
The Potter was refurbished in 1910, and continued in operation on the Portland–Ilwaco run. In the early 1990s, Professor Frederick Bracher recalled riding on the Potter from Portland to Ilwaco as a young child in 1915:

The T.J. Potter was an old but comfortable sidewheel steamboat, ponderously slow, even when going downstream. Although it was later replaced by the Georgiana, a sleek and narrow twin-screw steamer, I preferred the T.J. Potter to the smaller and faster rival. The monumental semi-circular paddle boxes, painted like the rays of the rising sun, arched up as high as the boat deck; the paddle wheels produced a prodigious wake to port and starboard, as well as astern. On the main deck were staterooms for the elderly, the rich, or the newly married; and a continuous seat ran all the way around the stern. If the weather was good, there would be deck chairs on the open afterdeck, and the glass-enclosed lounge cabins were comfortable on cold or rainy days.

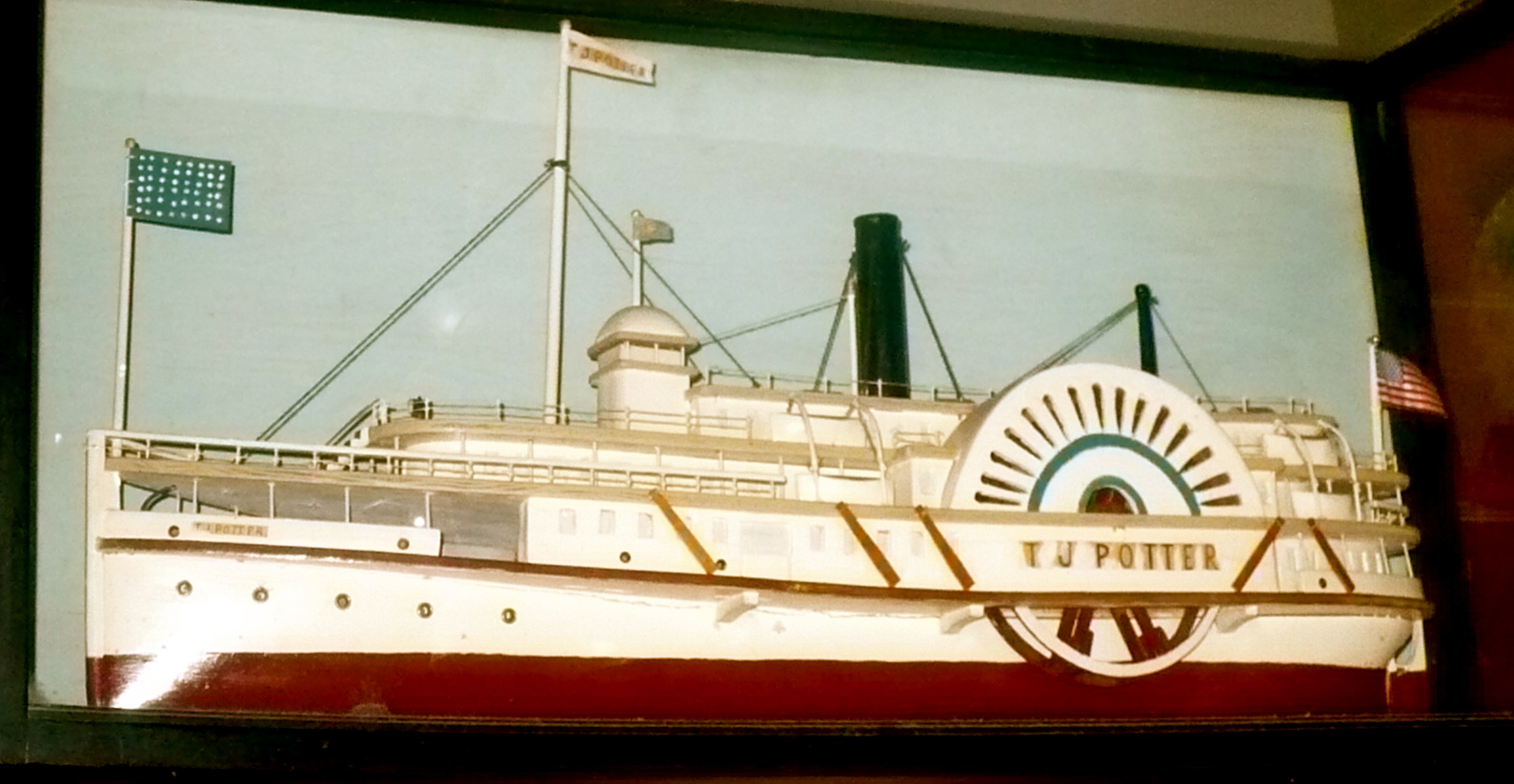
folk art model of the T.J. Potter

Just before the opening of the tourist season in 1916 the Potter was condemned for passenger use. The Potter was not replaced on the Portland–Ilwaco run, as there was insufficient passenger traffic to justify putting a new boat on the route. The Portland–Astoria route was continued until 1936, when heavy profit losses removed the Georgiana from service.

The Potter then served as a barracks boat for construction crews until Nov. 20, 1920, when her license was revoked. She was abandoned on the northeast side of Youngs Bay near Astoria. She was burned and salvaged for her metal shortly afterward. Faber publishes a photograph showing her abandoned, stripped of upper works, but with her hull substantially intact, with large metal components such as her rudder strap intact. (Faber, at page 155).

== Today ==
The T. J. Potter has heavily deteriorated over the past 90 years. All that remains are the parts of most of the ribs as well as the keel.

Remains of T. J. Potter in 1957, on Youngs Bay

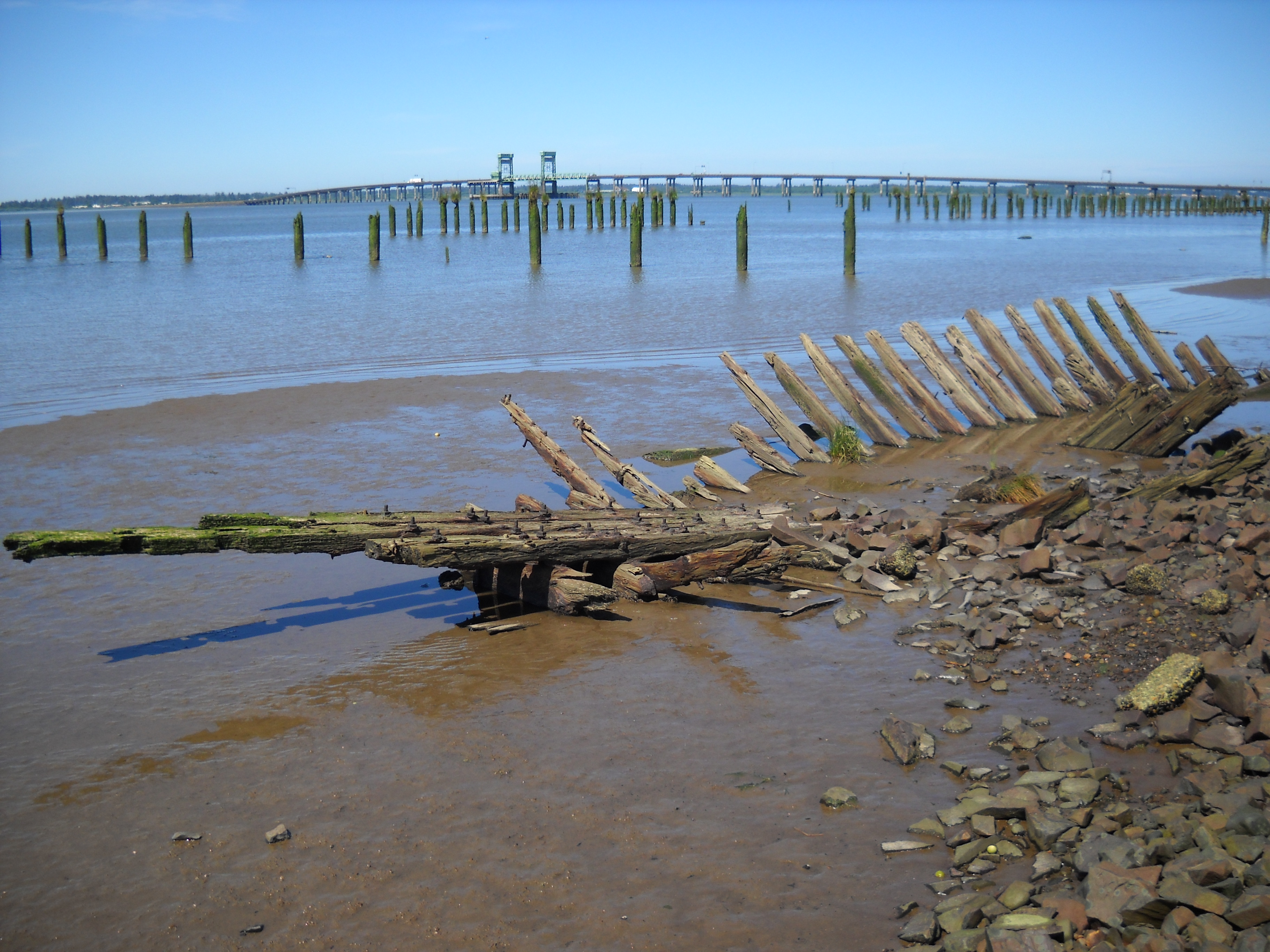
Remains of T. J. Potter in 2012.
