= Wide West =

American luxury steamboat (1877–1888)

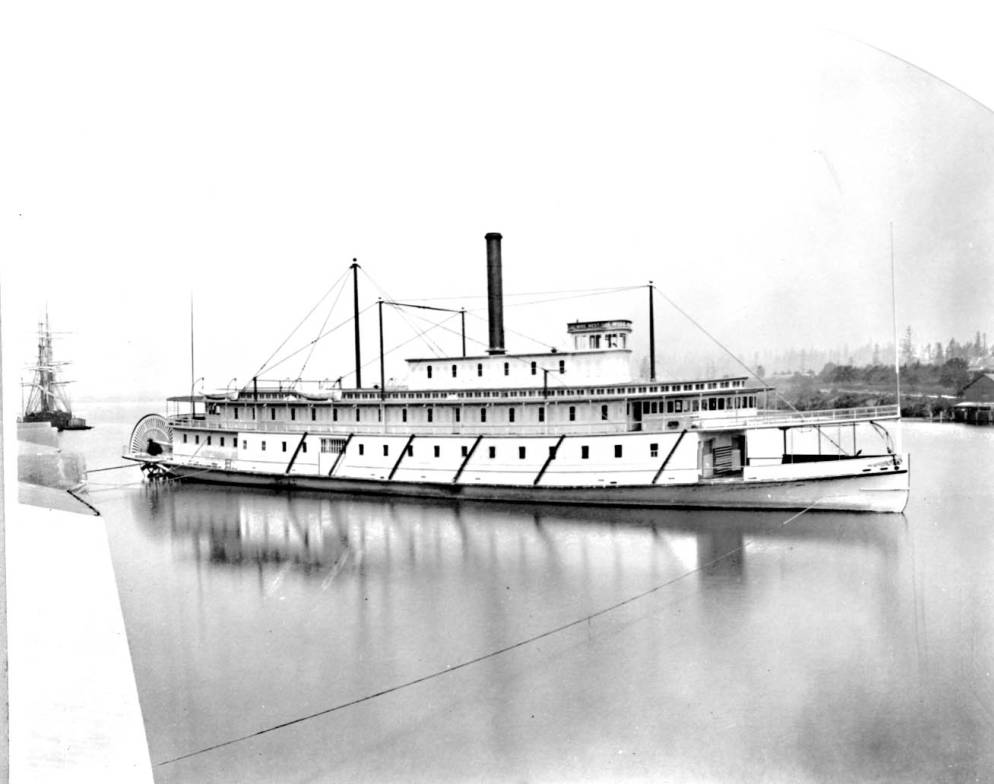
- Wide West, probably on the Willamette River.

History
- Name: Wide West
- Owner: Oregon Steam Navigation Co.; later, Oregon Railway & Navig. Co.
- Route: Columbia River and lower Willamette River to Portland, Oregon
- Builder: John J. Holland
- Cost: $114,000
- Completed: 1877, Portland, Oregon
- Out of service: 1888
- Identification: 80650
- Fate: Dismantled 1888, engines and upper works used to complete T. J. Potter
- Notes: Hull repowered as propeller-driven barge, wrecked on Destruction Island, 1889.

General characteristics
- Class & type: Riverine passenger/freight
- Tonnage: 1200.80 gross; 928.75 registered tons
- Length: 218 ft (66.4 m) hull; 246 ft 9 in (75.21 m) measured over hull (exclusive of fantail)
- Beam: 39 ft 9 in (12.1 m) hull; 46 ft 9 in (14.25 m) exclusive of guards
- Depth: 8 ft 0 in (2.44 m)
- Decks: three (main, boiler, and hurricane)
- Installed power: twin steam engines, horizontally mounted, each with bore of 28 in (71.1 cm) and stroke of 8 ft (2.44 m)
- Propulsion: sternwheel
- Speed: Varied, highest recorded over long distance: 24 miles (39 km) per hour (downstream).

Wide West was a steamboat that served in the Pacific Northwest of the United States. It had a reputation as a luxury boat of its days.

Wide West was built in 1877 in Portland, Oregon, by the Oregon Steam Navigation Company. It was built entirely of wood. Wide West was a sternwheeler, 218 feet long and rated at 1200 tons. On the Columbia River, unlike the Mississippi and other rivers in the eastern part of the country, there were very few sidewheel steamboats. Wide West was placed on the run from Portland to the Cascades of the Columbia, which at that time, was the head of navigation. Passengers had to disembark and ride a short railway around the Cascades to board another steamboat to travel further upriver. Cargo similarly had to be unloaded and reloaded again.

In 1888 Wide West was disassembled. The upper works and machinery were used to build another steamboat, the T. J. Potter. This was typical of the time, as the wooden-hulls would become waterlogged and worn, and it was easier to simply rebuild a new boat. The upper works and machinery were reused, as they were more durable and still had economic value after only ten years of operation.

In practice, Wide West was sometimes referred to simply as the West.

== Design, dimensions and cost ==
Wide West was built for the Oregon Steam Navigation Company, which held a monopoly on steamboat navigation on the Columbia River. Wide West was intended to be the pride vessel of the company's fleet. In 1895, Wide West was said to have been the "perfect sternwheeler" constructed for Columbia River service. When in service, Wide West was characterized as "palatial" and "the finest steamboat in America."

According to one source, the hull of Wide West was about 215 ft 9 in (65.76 m) feet long or 218 ft 9 in (66.68 m). However, the overall length of the vessel was greater than the hull length because of an extension of the main deck, called a "fantail" over the stern which carried the stern-wheel. Measured this way, Wide West was 236 ft 9 in (72.2 m) feet long. Similarly, the width of the vessel, called "beam" was measured differently, depending on whether it was over the hull or over the guards, which were wide heavy timber extensions running along the top of the hull on both sides of the vessel. According to one source, Wide West had a beam of 36 ft 9 in (11.2 m) feet.

According to another source, the beam was 39 ft 6 in (12.04 m). Another source states that, over the guards, Wide West and the very similar sternwheeler R.R. Thompson measured 246 ft 9 in (75.21 m) in length and 46 ft 9 in (14.25 m) in beam. Wide West had a depth of hold of 8 ft 0 in (2.44 m).

According to the official steamboat registry, Wide West was 218 ft 9 in (66.7 m) long, with a beam of 39 ft 9 in (12.1 m) and depth of hold of 8 ft 9 in (2.7 m). The overall size of the vessel was expressed in "tons" which was not a unit of weight but rather of size. Wide West was 1200.80 gross and 928.75 registered tons. The official steamboat registry number was 80650. According to one source, Wide West cost about $114,000 to construct.

== Construction and launch ==
Construction began about the middle of June 1877 at the site of what in 1881 had become the Ainsworth dock in Portland, Oregon. This was also known as the steamboat boneyard. The hull was divided into 84 water-tight compartments, each of which was provided with a steam-powered siphon to pump out any leaking water. The vessel was launched on August 15, 1877. It was estimated that 2,000 people witnessed the launch of the Wide West. The launch, supervised by the builder, John J. Holland, took place at 4:45 in the afternoon and went flawlessly.

== Cargo capacity ==
Wide West could carry about 550 tons of wheat and still have the guards (large wooden rails around the upper edge of the hull) not awash. Had the hull been made one foot deeper, Wide West could have carried another 120 tons of wheat. In this respect, Wide West was considered inferior to a similar vessel, the R.R. Thompson, built one year later.

== Engineering ==
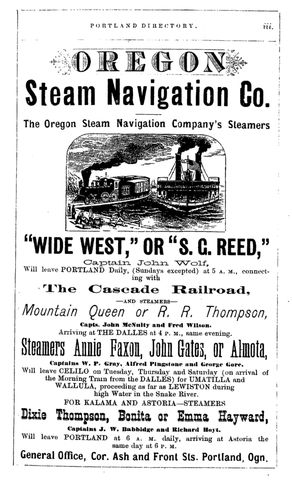
Advertisement for Wide West and other boats of the Oregon Steam Navigation Company.

Power for Wide West was supplied by two horizontal high-pressure steam engines built by Pusey, Jones & Co., of Wilmington, Delaware. Drawings for the engines were prepared by John Gates (b.1839), chief engineer of the Oregon Steam Navigation Company, and included an independent cut-off device, designed by Gates, which reduced wastage of steam in the cylinders which resulted in a “great economy of fuel.” Each engine had a bore of 28 in (711.2 mm) and a stroke of 8 ft (2.44 m).

They were exact duplicates of the engines installed in the R.R. Thompson, which were built by the firm of Harlan and Hollingsworth, also of Wilmington. The engines generated 500 horsepower.

Wide West was expected to run at 18 miles (29 km) per hour, on a route between the Cascades and Astoria, Oregon. However, by October, 1877, the steamer had not been placed on the Astoria route, but was running solely between Portland and the Cascades, prompting criticism from the Daily Astorian of the decision.

A single boiler, originally wood-fired, generated steam at 90 pounds pressure per square inch, although it seems that pressure of up to 125 pounds per inch was possible. The boiler, built at Willamette Iron Works, of a type known as “Gates Sectional Boiler” was 7 feet in diameter and 30 feet long. It had 336 tubes, each 2.5 inches in diameter.

Fuel consumption was approximate one cord per hour, or, conservatively estimated, one cord for every 16 miles travelled. This was less than one-half of what a Mississippi-type steamboat with comparable capacity would consume.

The boiler was designed with a spark arrester which captured combusted material from the firebox, automatically hosed down the material with water, and discharged it into the river through a port in the hull. This kept the upper decks clean from soot which would otherwise have been exhausted through the smokestack and reduced the amount of paint needed for the cabins.

Water pressure for the washbasins in the cabin, and for the hydraulic steering gear was furnished by auxiliary steam-powered donkey engines.

== Placed into service as freight boat ==
Wide West made its first trial run on October 17, 1877. At that time, the inland region of the Pacific Northwest was developing rapidly, with steamboats being loaded to capacity with wheat on their downstream trips, and returned upriver with cargos of merchandise, building supplies, farm machinery and other goods. Wide West was rushed into freight service without completion of her cabins and furnishings, making a daily round trip, heavily laden with cargo, between Portland and the Cascades.

== Passenger accommodations completed ==
In April 1878, fitting out of the vessel was completed. It was at this time that the Gates hydraulic steering gear was installed, with Wide West being the first vessel it was fitted on. The initial trip of the vessel, in a fully completed state, occurred on April 16, 1878. At this time, the vessel was moored opposite Swan Island to be photographed by Joseph Buchtel (1830–1916), a well-known photographer. The public was invited on board on the afternoon of the initial cruise, on April 16, to view the newly completed steamer.

== Upper works and cabins ==
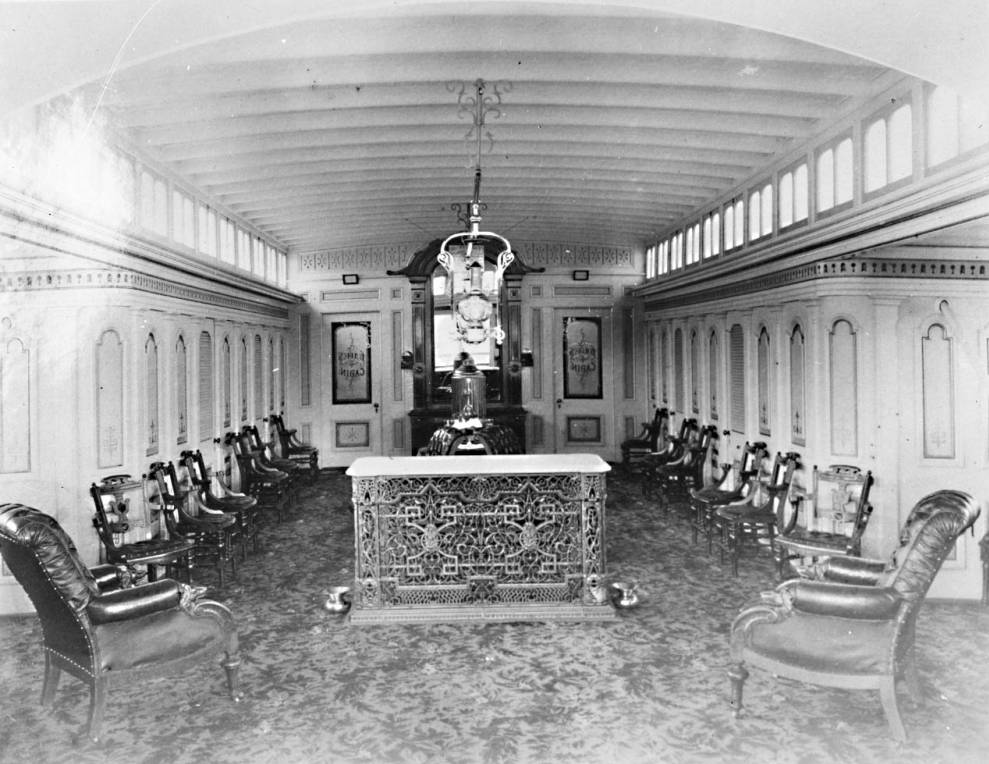
Passenger accommodation on Wide West. This is identified by one source as the ladies cabin, but note the cuspidors on the carpet beside the marble-topped radiator.

The deck above the main deck was called the “boiler deck”. A portion of the boiler, known as the “steam drum” protruded into the hall on the forward end of boiler deck, and was surrounded with metal jacketing. Overcoats, valises and other things were often stowed on tope of the jacketing while the vessel was under way.

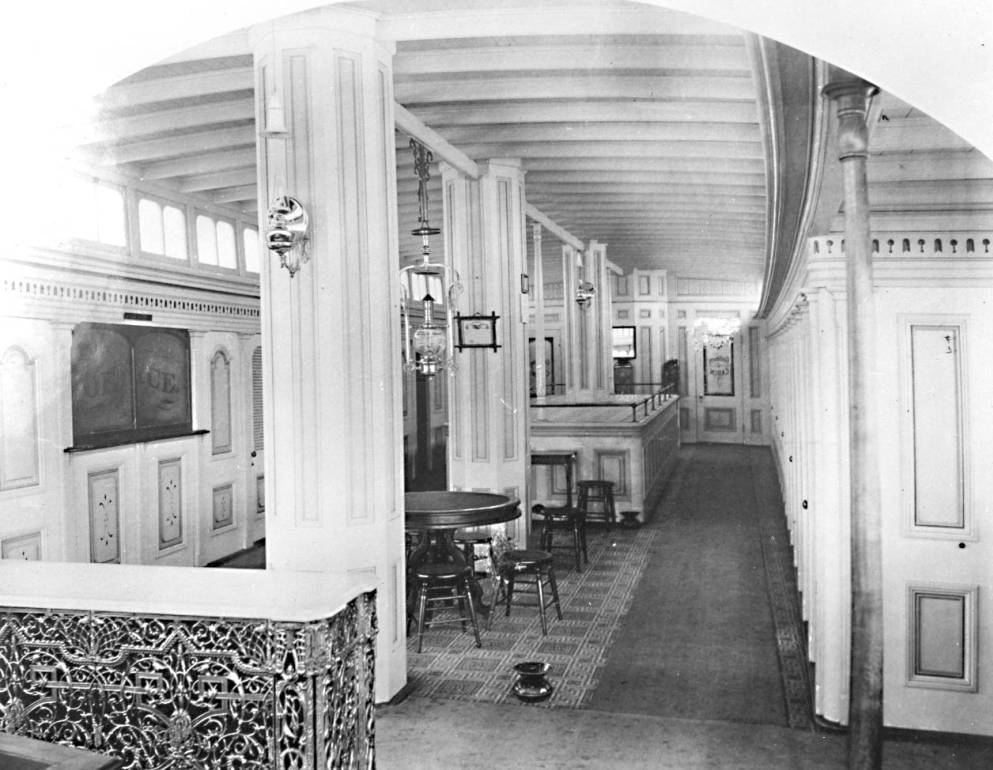
Forward passenger accommodation on Wide West. Note window labeled "office", probably that either of the purser or the freight clerk. Jacketed steam drum also shown, enclosed with a low rail.

The floors of the boiler deck were covered with mosaic oil cloth. The hall in the forward part was said to have been painted in a “delicate shade of lilac.” The forward hallway, which was known as the “social hall” included the purser's office on one side, and the freight clerk's office on the other. Ten staterooms, each containing two bachelor's berths, opened on to the forward hall. Each stateroom was to have a stationary marble wash basin with hot and cold running water. Large mirrors were placed at the ends of the cabins and chandeliers were hung at regular intervals trom the center line of the ceiling.

Towards the stern, the boiler deck then transitioned into the dining room, onto which opened 22 “large and commodious” staterooms, all of uniform size, with each stateroom including a three-quarters bedstead for two persons, with a single berth above. These accommodations, as well as those in the ladies’ saloon, were said to “contrast favorably with the cramped up little dens called state-rooms on the eastern steamboats.”. The dining room was painted in pale lemon, with gold beads on the door panels. The floor in the dining room was covered with a Brussels-style carpet, apparently locally made. The chairs and tables were made locally as well, of Oregon ash with burl maple veneer.

Further towards the stern on the boiler deck was the ladies saloon, which included six rooms, painted in a different color from the dining room. One of the rooms had been fitted up as a ladies toilet, in which the pumps kept “continuous jets of water playing, while the boat is in motion, so that no offensive effluvia taints these sumptuous cabins.” During winter, this area was heated by a steam radiator covered a marble slab. At night the room was lit by nickel-plated lamps.

Above the boiler deck was the hurricane deck, which was also called simply the “roof” in steamboat parlance. Seven lifeboats were located on the roof, along with crane derricks to lower them. There was a structure on the roof called a “texas,” which housed all the officers of the vessel, except for the clerks, in ten cabins.

Above the texas was the pilot house, which featured plate glass windows and a wheel which controlled the vessels rudder's by hydraulic power, exceeding, it was said, the strength of ten men. It was said that a child of six could move the wheel. In 1881, seventeen other steamboats of the Oregon Railway and Navigation Company were similarly equipped.

== Officers and crew ==
In 1881, the master of the vessel was John H. Wolf (also seen spelled “Wolfe”)(c1821 or 1824-1885), who in 1881 had had 28 years experience on the Columbia River. Chief engineer in 1881 was John Marshall. On the 1883 Astoria runs, Wide West was under the command of Capt John W. Babbidge (b.1842) and also under Capt. Clark W. Sprague. One of the pursers of Wide West was Napoleon Bonaparte Ingalls (1830–1922), who also served on many other well-known steamers that operated on the Columbia river system.

== Service on the Columbia River ==
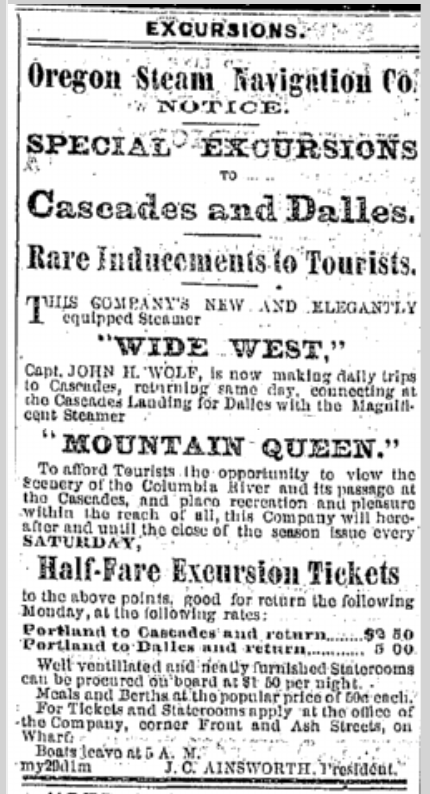
Advertisement, June 1, 1878, for Wide West.

Wide West ran for several years on the Portland-Cascades route, occasionally going to Astoria. Passengers disembarked, and all freight was offloaded at the Cascades, to be taken by a portage railroad around the rapids of the Cascades, to another steamboat, which would proceed to The Dalles, Oregon, where the process would be repeated to bypass the long stretch of rapids above that point on the river. When first built, the Daily Astorian criticized O.S.N. for not placing the boat on the Astoria route.

Won’t the Oregon Steam Navigation folk catch it, ‘though if they do not send that new steamer Wide West on to this route? What right have they to give the Cascade trade the biggest and best boat. Will some of THE ASTORIAN “satellites” in Portland please put a cockle-burr under Mr. S.G. Read’s crupper until we get a good fire brand ready for that posish?

In 1881 Wide West made daily trips between Portland, Oregon and the Cascades of the Columbia, and was reported to have been the favorite vessel of the Oregon Railway and Navigation Company. In 1881, Wide West was estimated to be capable of operating for another ten years. The wheat traffic in 1882 was extremely heavy, and Wide West was frequently loaded to capacity on its runs between Portland and the Cascades.

Gambling on river boats in the Pacific Northwest was never as prevalent as on the Mississippi craft, Wide West was said to have been an exception; supposedly “her palatial equipment lent itself to the art of professional card playing, and high stakes were not considered an exception aboard her.”

== Power, accidents, and speed ==
Wide West had a reputation as a powerful steamer. It could tow two or three barges without difficulty. Wide West once lost power in one engine, but ran for several days on the one remaining engine. The other cylinder blew however, on August 28, 1878, when the vessel was three miles distant from Vancouver.

Several Chinese passengers on the main deck, that is the machinery and freight deck, were injured by flying debris. Racial segregation of the time required Chinese passengers to travel only on this deck. The explosion disabled Wide West, which had to anchor and was out of service for three weeks. The steamer had to be towed back to Portland by the Ocklahama and the Ordway. Emma Hayward took the place of Wide West on the Cascades run.

On April 16, 1879, Wide West made the fastest run ever from Cascades downstream to Vancouver, Washington, covering the 47 mile distance in one hour and 47 minutes, almost 24 miles per hour. It was speculated then that no other steamboat on the river, save only the S.G. Reed, could come within 5 miles per hour of this speed.

As of December 1878, Wide West’s fastest time from Portland to Vancouver was 67 minutes. This was bested on December 11, 1878 by the then new (launched September 30, 1878) steamer Lurline, which made the same run in 60 minutes with 95 pounds of steam, carrying 150 troops to Fort Vancouver. The steamer Emma Hayward, when first on the route, had made the run in 65 minutes.

In 1880, Wide West made the Portland-Astoria run in five hours, a record time that was unbroken for several years. It was claimed that when Wide West towed the hull of the dismantled older steamer Oneonta, the old boat had moved faster than at any time when under actual power.

== Ownership change ==
In 1879, the original owner of Wide West, the very successful Oregon Steam Navigation Company, ceased to exist, and most of its assets, including Wide West and other steamboats passed to a new concern, the Oregon Railway & Navigation Company. At 1200 tons, Wide West and the slight smaller R.R. Thompson (1158 tons), were by far the largest vessels in the new company’s fleet, the next largest being the Harvest Queen (845 tons) and the S.G. Reed (800 tons). Wide West was also the most valuable vessel of the O.R. & N, being valued at $40,000 in July 1881.

== Prominent passengers ==
On October 4, 1880, the Wide West carried President Rutherford B. Hayes, Gen. William T. Sherman and the president’s party from Vancouver, WA to the Cascades, where the party inspected the Cascade locks, then under construction, and then proceeded east, along the portage railway to above the Cascades, where they boarded the Hassalo, bound for The Dalles, Oregon.

== Conversion to coal-firing ==
On February 18, 1883, Wide West was reported to have been taken out of service at the Portland “boneyard”, an area on the Willamette River used for storage and rehabilitation of old steamboats. The vessel had undergone a thorough overhaul, during which the firebox was converted to a coal-burner. Other steamboats of the Oregon Railway and Navigation Company were undergoing conversion to coal-firing at the same time.

The first trip with coal-fired boilers was on March 22, 1883, running from Portland to Astoria. Wide West departed Portland at 5:30 a.m. and arrived at Astoria at 12:15 p.m. The trip was an experimental one, intended to test the function of the coal-fired machinery, and develop a time-table for the Portland-Astoria route. Several high-ranking officials of the company were on board for the trip, including F.T. Dodge, superintendent of the river division, John Gates, chief engineer of the river division, and D.P. Keene, secretary for C.H. Prescott, the company manager.

== Portland-Astoria route ==
In April 1883, Wide West was placed on the route between Portland and Astoria. This route was 110 miles in length. The chief competitor on the route was the then-new (built in 1881) propeller-driven Fleetwood, owned by Captain U.B. Scott and his associates.

Wide West left Portland daily at 5:00 a.m., with the objective of arriving in Astoria by noon. Wide West would then leave Astoria at 1:00 pm to be able to return to Portland by 9:00 pm. The steamboat was orin on Sundays, with a layoff on Mondays. Stops along the way were limited to St. Helens, Kalama, Oak Point, Cathlamet, and Brookfield. In 1881 the fare one way was $2.

In June 1883, Wide West made daily trips, except Wednesday, between Portland and Astoria, Oregon. Wide West was taken off the Astoria route on September 5, 1883. Wide West was advertised as running in conjunction with the Ilwaco Steam Navigation Company’s steamer Gen. Miles. On Saturdays, the Miles would depart for Garibaldi and Tillamook, Oregon upon the arrival of Wide West at Astoria, thus enabling travellers to go from Portland to Tillamook in only 12 hours. On other days (except Wednesdays and Sundays) either the Gen. Miles or the Gen. Canby would meet the Wide West in Astoria, and then carry passengers and freight on to Fort Canby and Ilwaco, Washington.

== Return to Cascades route ==
Wide West was last placed on the Cascades route under Capt. A.B. Pillsbury.

== Dismantled ==
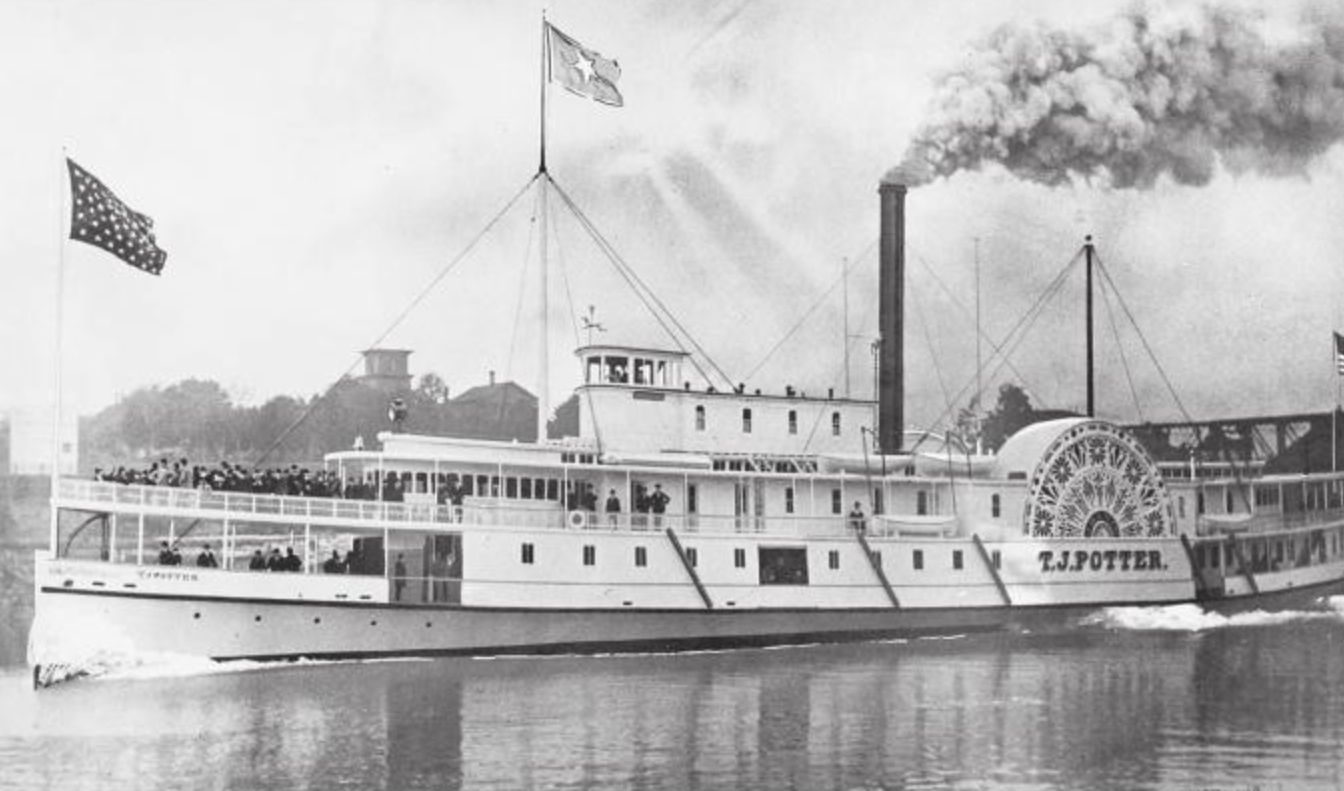
T.J. Potter, the steamer constructed with the upper works and machinery of Wide West.

In August 1887, the boiler, engines, and upper works of Wide West were nearly as good as new, but the hull was "rotten", and consequently the owners planned to construct a new hull for the steamer, and shift the works and the machinery over to it. The new hull was to be nearly as long as the old one, with two feet less beam, and one foot less depth of hold. The boiler deck was to be cut down one and one-half to two feet.

In 1887, Wide West was dismantled in Portland. The cabin structures and most of the fittings were transferred to a new steamer, the side-wheel driven T.J. Potter. The work was done under the supervision of shipbuilder J.H. Steffen, who along with Capt. James W. Troup was one of the designers of the new vessel. Wide West was almost unrecognizable once the works had been transferred to the new hull, which was to be a side-wheeler rather than a sternwheeler. According to one source, new cylinders were bored for the side-wheel engines. According to another source, the old engines would be used in the new steamer.

== Wreck off the coast of Washington ==
The hull of the Wide West was sold to the Puget Sound Lighter and Transportation Company, which, keeping the name Wide West, in 1889 installed into the hull a small steam engine and a propeller drive. The new owners intended to put the vessel into service on Puget Sound. The hull was to be converted into a “mammoth steam barge” to be used for slow freight on the Sound.

On December 25, 1889, under Capt. Frederick Sparling (b.1862), the Wide West was sent of the Columbia River bar and into the Pacific Ocean, to make the voyage around the Olympic Peninsula. On January 6, 1890, the owners of the barge Wide West reported that they believed the vessel to have been lost at sea. This turned out to be correct.

Sparling was reported to have had only a limited knowledge of steam navigation. Soon after crossing the bar, Wide West met heavy seas and high wind. The large hull proved to be unmanageable in these conditions, and an auxiliary sailing rig which had been installed was blown away by the wind. The propeller was also lost, and the vessel was wrecked on Destruction Island.

None of the crew were lost however. They managed to reach the mainland, where they walked up along the Hoh River and sought the assistance of the Native Americans there. The party procured a guide to take them north along the coast to La Push, Washington. From La Push, the party proceeded about 40 miles across the Olympic Mountains to the Pysht River, where they were able to board the steamer Evangel to reach Port Townsend, Washington.

Wide West was said to have been a total loss. The value of the barge was estimated to have been about $15,000. However, everything movable on the wreck, including engines, boiler and machinery, was salvaged before the hull was battered to pieces. The license of the chief engineer, one Goulding, was suspended as a result of the wreck. The reasons for the suspension were that the engineer “had taken charge of new machinery that had never been inspected, and also went to sea knowing that it was in violation of the marine laws; also for incompetence shown by putting out with his engines and propellers in a disabled condition.”

== See also ==
- Steamboats of the Columbia River
- T. J. Potter (sidewheeler)
