= Camano (steamboat) =

1906 steamboat in United States

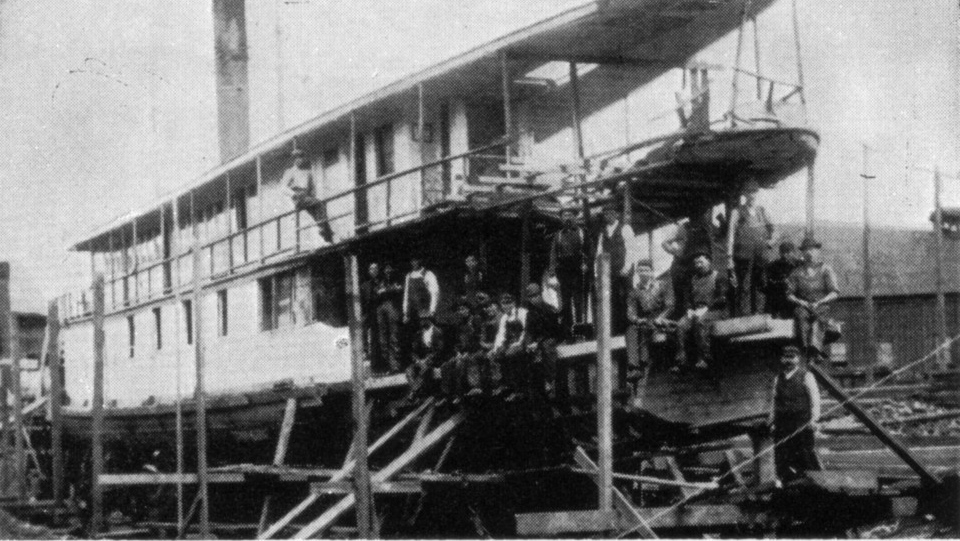
- Camano raised following sinking in 1912

History
- Name: Camano, later Tolo
- Owner: Island Transportation Co.
- Route: Puget Sound
- Completed: 1906, Coupeville, Washington
- Identification: US registry #202970
- Fate: Sank after collision November 1917

General characteristics
- Type: Inland steamboat
- Tonnage: as rebuilt (1910): 92 gross tons; 62 regist. tons
- Length: as built : 88 ft (26.82 m); as rebuilt (1910) : 108.9 ft (33.19 m)
- Beam: 16.9 ft (5.15 m)
- Depth: 5.1 ft (1.55 m) depth of hold
- Installed power: compound steam engine
- Crew: five (5)

Camano was a steamboat built in 1906 at Coupeville, Washington, which operated on Puget Sound from 1906 to 1917. Camano was later known as Tolo. As Tolo the vessel was sunk in 1917 as a result of a collision at sea. Four people died as a result.

== Design and construction ==
Camano was built by Capt. H.B. Lovejoy, doing business as the Island Transportation Company to run on the Everett – Coupeville, Washington shipping route as a replacement for the sternwheeler Fairhaven. As built, Camano was 88 ft (26.82 m) long

In 1910, Camano was rebuilt, after which the vessel had the following dimensions: 108.9 ft (33.19 m), 16.9 ft (5.15 m) beam, and 5.1 ft (1.55 m) depth of hold. The vessel was kept on the Everett-Coupeville route however. In 1911, when the steamer Calista was built for Island Transportation Co., at Dockton, Washington, Camano towed the new steamer to Seattle for completion.

== Operations ==
From 1906 to 1912 Camano ran on a route from Coupeville to Everett. H.B. Lovejoy's son, F.E. Lovejoy (1889–1940) served on board as a deckhand. He had also carved the nameboard for the ship.

Camano burned oil a fuel which was just coming into use among the Puget Sound steamboats when Camano was built. Originally the oil fuel for Camano was supplied on barrels brought to Coupeville by Fairhaven, a woodburner like most of the older vessels. In November 1906, an iron tank, measuring 8 ft (2.44 m) by 4 ft (1.22 m) by 4 ft (1.22 m) was installed on the Coupeville dock to refuel Camano. Refueling was later done at Clinton and Edmonds, Washington.

Every day except Sundays, Camano would depart Coupeville at 7:00 am southbound, stopping at Oak Harbor at 7:30 am, Camano Island at 8:15 am, Langley at 9:15 am, Clinton, Washington at 9:45 am, arriving in Everett at 10:15 am. Camano would depart Everett headed northbound at 3:00 pm. Stops were made depending on call at Brown's Point. San de Fuca, and Saratoga.

Camano was too small to have sleeping quarters or a galley. The crew's work day began 6:00 am, and they ate breakfast in the morning before work. The crew didn't eat dinner until after the work day was complete, which was at 11:30 pm. Lunch was a cold meal, with coffee heated up on the head of the high-pressure steam cylinder.

In March 1907, Camano towed the sternwheeler Fairhaven off the beach. Fairhaven had been blown onto the dock at Coupeville during a gale, and then on to the shore, suffering substantial damage.

Camano was also placed on a route running from downtown Seattle to Alki Point. It cost 10 cents to ride the boat on this run.

== Sale to KCTC ==
Camano was sold to the Kitsap County Transportation Company and renamed Tolo. In November, 1915, Kitsap County Transportation Company purchased Camano for $15,000.

== Accidents ==
Camano was involved in several accidents. In one instance, on August 16, 1912, the much larger steel-hulled steamship Sioux, coming in from Seattle, was approaching the Everett dock. From the bridge, Capt. William Thorton of Sioux signaled the engine room for "half astern" to slow the vessel down. Instead the engine room gave him "half ahead" which caused the steamer to ram into the dock. Captain Thorton then signaled for "full astern".

Another mistake was made and the Sioux went full ahead, smashing into Camano's stern, driving Camano forward into the 75 ft (22.86 m) gasoline launch Island Flyer which in turn struck the newly built motor launch Alverene. Island Flyer was sunk as a result and Alverene was seriously damaged. Camano then sank at the dock. The small launch Arrow was demolished and the steam launches Ranger and Daphne suffered lesser damage. The total damage was valued at $30,000. It turned out that an engine room assistant, known as an oiler had been left in charge of the telegraph. No one was killed although there was at least one close call.

On March 1, 1914, in Elliott Bay, Camano collided with Modoc not far from the piers of the central Seattle waterfront. The collision was ruled to have been Modoc′s fault.

== Sinking ==
In November, 1917, under the command of Capt. George Benson, Tolo was en route from Seattle to Bainbridge Island in a heavy fog with eight crew and 53 passengers on board. The tug Magic (67 gross tons) collided with Camano, and Camano sank in less than eight minutes. Magic sent off distress signals. H.B. Kennedy responded. The skillful crew of the Kennedy, with the aid of Magic, was able to rescue most of the people from Camano. Four people died however, two women and one man from the passengers, and from the crew, the Chinese cook.
