= Sioux (steamship) =

1910 steamboat in United States

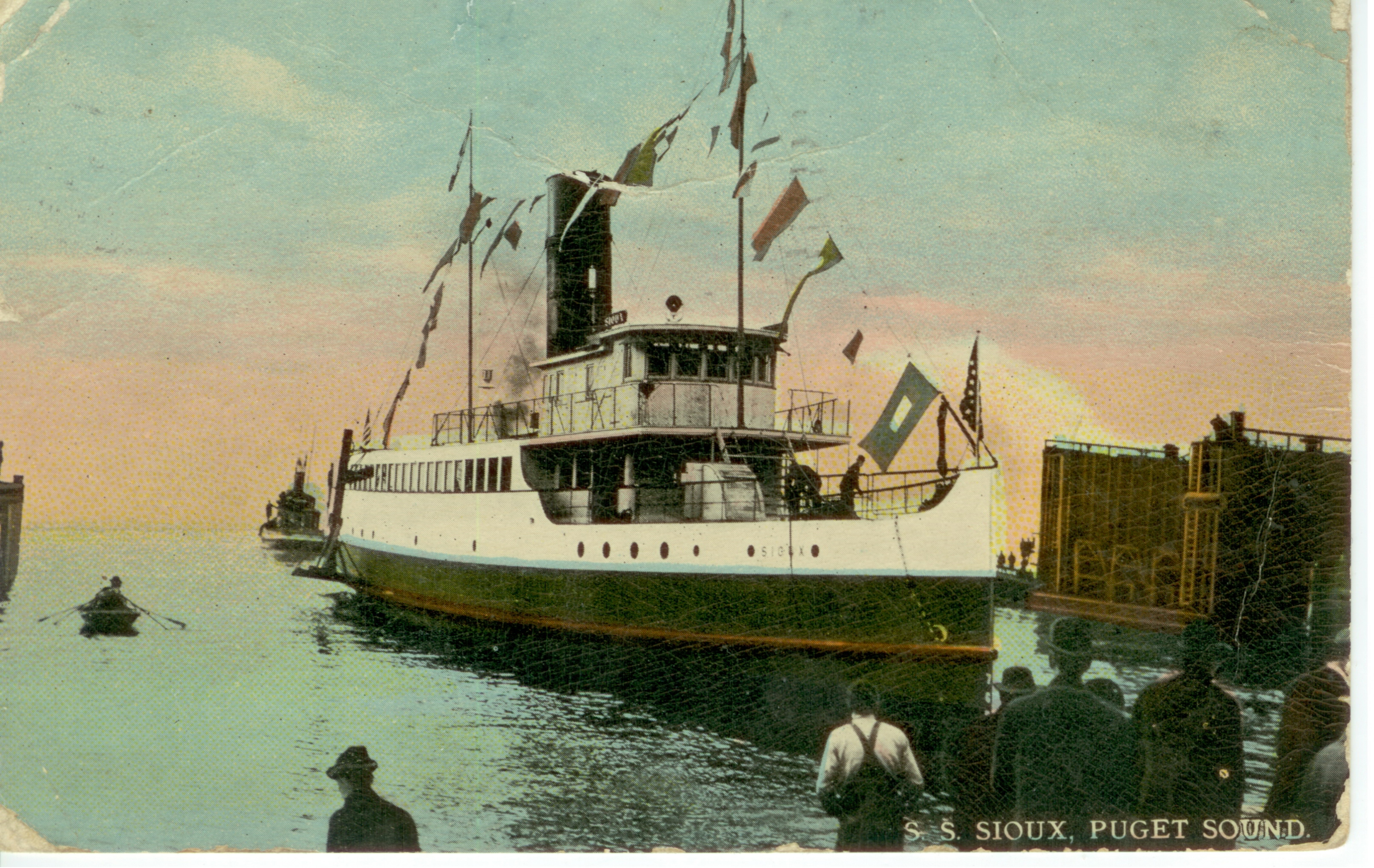
- Sioux as shown on an old postcard.

History
- Name: Sioux later Olympic and Franklin R. Leisenburg
- Owner: Puget Sound Navigation Co., U.S. Army, others
- Route: Puget Sound, Strait of Juan de Fuca
- Builder: The Moran Company
- Completed: 1911
- Identification: US registry #208278
- Fate: Sold

General characteristics
- Type: coastal steamship and ferry
- Tonnage: as built : 466 gross tons, 266 regist. tons
- Length: 148.3 ft (45.20 m)
- Beam: 24.2 ft (7.38 m)
- Depth: 14.8 ft (4.51 m) depth of hold
- Installed power: compound steam engine; four cylinders, 14 in (35.6 cm), 22 in (55.9 cm)and two 26 in (66.0 cm); stroke 20 in (50.8 cm), 1,400 hp (1,000 kW)
- Speed: 16 knots (following 1924 rebuild)

Sioux was a steamship which was operated on Puget Sound and the Strait of Juan de Fuca from 1912 to 1941. From 1924 to 1941, following reconstruction, the vessel operated as an auto ferry under the name Olympic. During the Second World War (1941-1945) this vessel was taken under the control of the U.S. Army and renamed the Franklin R. Leisenburg. The Liesenburg served as a ferry in the Panama Canal area under Army control, and then was sold to a firm which ran the vessel on the Surinam river in South America.

== Design and construction ==
Following the loss of the nearly-new but wooden steamship Clallam in 1904, Joshua Green, president of the Puget Sound Navigation Company, owner of the Clallam and the dominant Puget Sound shipping concern, announced that the company would replace its wooden steamships with ones built of steel. As part of this effort, in 1910, the steel steamers Sioux and Kulshan. were built nearly simultaneously in Seattle by The Moran Company. Sol Duc was specifically designed for the Seattle – Tacoma.

Dimensions for Sioux were 461 gross tons, length 148.3 ft (45.20 m) beam of 24.2 ft (7.38 m) and depth of hold of 14.8 ft (4.51 m). Power was supplied by a four-cylinder, compound steam engine, with cylinder bores sized14 in (35.6 cm), 22 in (55.9 cm)and two 26 in (66.0 cm); stroke 20 in (50.8 cm). Two oil-fired boilers produced steam at 250 pounds pressure, with whole power plant developing 1,400 horsepower (1,000 kW).

== Operations ==
Originally Sioux was intended to be placed on the route from Seattle to Irondale, where an important ironworks had been established, and which had provided much of the steel for the construction of the vessel. In May 1911 Sioux was placed on the Irondale route but only ran until July 1911, when she was replaced by the City of Everett. The ironworks was in trouble financially and about to file bankruptcy, so the traffic on the route didn't appear to justify use of the new steamer. Instead, Sioux was placed on the route from Seattle to the new municipal dock at Tacoma, alternating with the Indianapolis so that a steamer left Seattle every two hours bound for Tacoma.

Sioux was later placed on the Hood Canal route, running with the sternwheeler State of Washington for the rest of the summer of 1911. Afterwards the steamship's permanent route became Seattle-Edmonds-Everett. Sioux could make the run in two hours, not as fast as the Flyer, but still considered good time. When the Lake Washington Ship Canal was completed, the Sioux was the first commercial vessel to pass through the locks during the opening ceremony on July 4, 1917.

== 1912 Everett harbor accident ==
Sioux was involved in an accident at Everett on August 16, 1912, which as it was said, resulted in "seriously depleting the local mosquito fleet". Steamships had no direct speed control from the bridge of the vessel. The captain signaled the engine room using a system of bells and dials called the engine room telegraph. Accidents could and did happen when engine telegraph signals were misinterpreted by the engine room. On this particular occasion, Sioux, coming in from Seattle, was approaching the Everett dock. From the bridge, Capt. William Thorton signaled the engine room for "half astern" to slow the vessel down. Instead the engine room gave him "half ahead" which caused the steamer to ram into the dock. Captain Thorton then signaled for "full astern".

Another mistake was made and the Sioux went full ahead, smashing into the stern of the Camano, driving Camano forward into the 75 ft (22.86 m) gasoline launch Island Flyer which in turn struck another gasoline launch, the newly built Alverene. Island Flyer was sunk as a result and Alverene was seriously damaged. Camano then sank at the dock. The small launch Arrow was demolished and the steam launches Ranger and Daphne suffered lesser damage.

It turned out that an engine room assistant, known as an oiler had been left in charge of the telegraph. No one was killed although there was at least one close call. The destruction showed the vulnerability of wooden-hulled steamers, one of the reasons why the Puget Sound Navigation Company switched to steel-hulled vessels.

== Reconstruction as ferry Olympic ==
In 1923, the Puget Sound Navigation Company decided to rebuild Sioux, then running the Seattle - Port Townsend route into an automobile ferry, and late in the year gave the reconstruction contract to the Todd Dry Dock corporation in Seattle. The reconstruction was completed in the first part of 1924. Sioux was renamed Olympic.

Sioux, renamed Olympic was placed on the Victoria, British Columbia to Port Angeles, Washington route across the Strait of Juan de Fuca, departed from Seattle on Saturday, June 14, 1924, making her first run on June 15, 1924, under Capt. Louis Van Bogaert, Chief Officer Harry Carter, and Chief Engineer I. Terado. Olympic had been scheduled to depart on Friday the 13th, but company management felt this supposedly ill-omened date would create too much adverse comment, and postponed the departure by one day.

Olympic is also reported to have been run on the Victoria, BC-Bellingham, Washington route.

== Later years ==
In 1941, the U.S. Army bought Olympic from the Puget Sound Navigation Company and rebuilt her for service in the Panama Canal area as the Franklin R. Leisenburg. After the war the vessel was sold to a firm in Dutch Guiana for service out of Paramaribo on the Surinam River. As of the late 1950s the ship was reported to be still in operation on the Surinam river.
