= Emma Hayward =

Steamboat

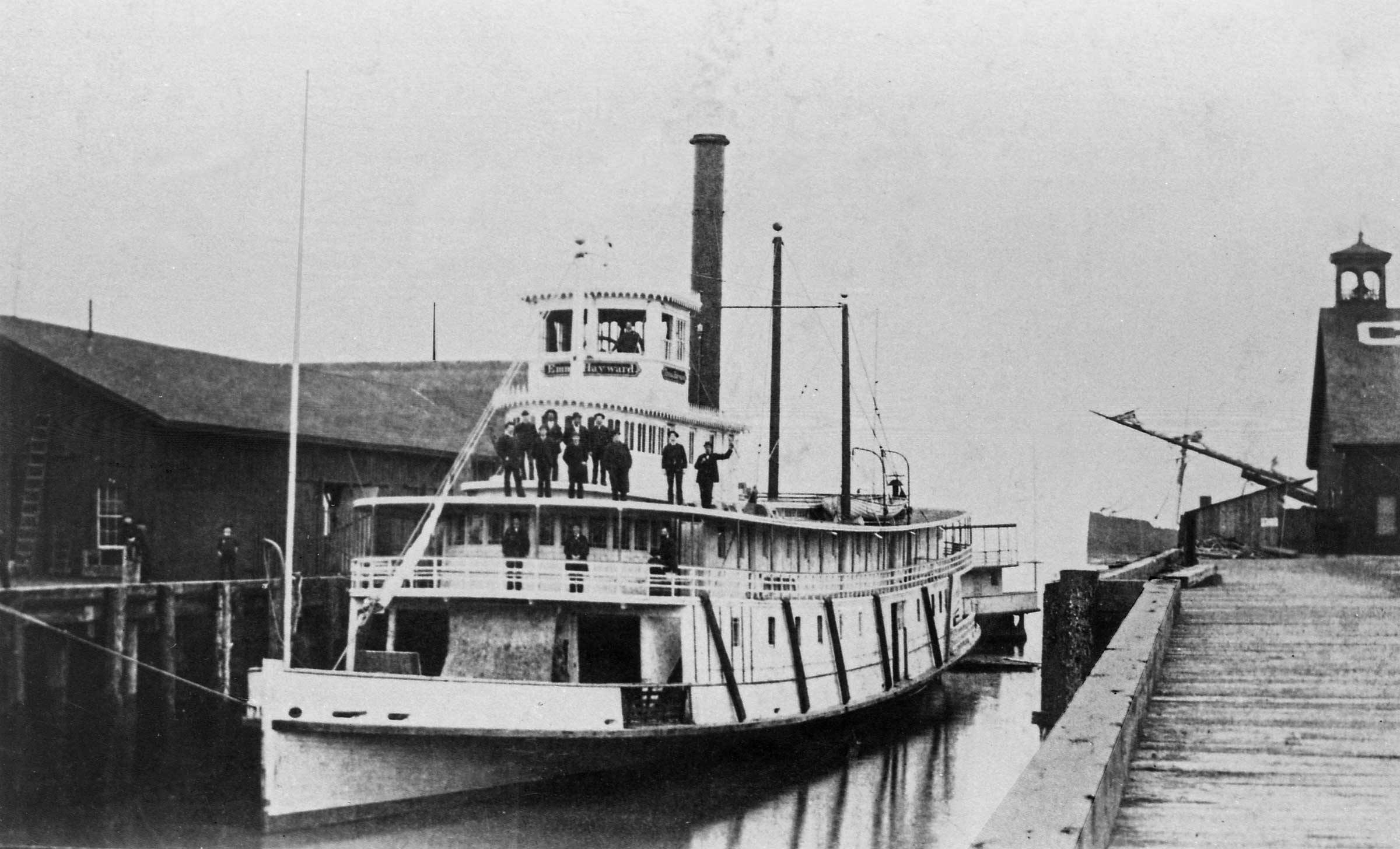
- Emma Hayward at foot of Main Street, Seattle, W.T., circa 1885.

History
- Name: Emma Hayward
- Owner: Oregon Steam Nav. Co.; Oregon Railway and Nav. Co.; Union Pacific Railway; Shaver Trans. Co.; Capt. James Good.
- Route: Columbia and Willamette rivers; Puget Sound
- Builder: John J. Holland
- Completed: 1871, at Portland, Oregon
- In service: 1871
- Identification: U.S. Steamboat registry #8763
- Fate: Converted to unpowered floating workshop, 1900; dismantled and converted to barge, 1905.

General characteristics
- Class & type: riverine passenger/freight
- Tonnage: 613.16 gross; 456.07 registered tons
- Length: 177 ft (53.9 m) measured over hull.
- Beam: 29 ft 9 in (9.1 m) measured over hull.
- Depth: 7.5 ft 0 in (2.29 m)
- Installed power: twin steam engines, horizontally mounted, each with a bore of 17 in (431.8 mm) and stroke of 7 ft (2.13 m).
- Propulsion: sternwheel

Emma Hayward commonly called the Hayward, was a steamboat that served in the Pacific Northwest. This vessel was once one of the finest and fastest steamboats on the Columbia River and Puget Sound. As newer vessels came into service, Emma Hayward was relegated to secondary roles, and, by 1891, was converted into a Columbia river tow boat.

In 1900, the machinery was stripped out of the boat, which was used as a floating workshop and storeroom until 1905, when it was sold to be converted into a barge. Emma Hayward was involved in a wide variety of maritime work, including the transport of troops to Seattle when martial law was declared in that city to counter anti-Chinese riots.

== Dimensions ==
Emma Hayward was 177 ft (53.9 m) measured over the hull (not including the stern extension of the deck to mount the stern wheel), with a beam (width), again measured over the hull and exclusive of the guards (wide protective beams of heavy timber along the upper edge of the hull), of 29 ft 9 in (9.1 m), and a depth of hold of 7.5 ft 0 in (2.29 m).

== Construction ==
In 1871, Emma Hayward was built at Portland, Oregon by John J. Holland (1843–1893) for the Oregon Steam Navigation Company, to operate on the lower Columbia river from Portland and the Cascades to Astoria. Accounts from that time sometimes refer to this vessel as the A. Hayward. Holland was an accomplished steamboat builder, who would build many of the largest and best known steamers.

Up until this time, the Astoria route had been somewhat neglected by the O.S.N. in favor of more profitable operations upriver to the Cascades.

According to one non-contemporaneous source, the machinery was fitted by engineer David Pardun (1830–1890). According to a contemporaneous source, the machinery was "put up" by John Gates, chief engineer of the Oregon Steam Navigation Company.

The twin horizontal steam engines for Hayward came from the dismantled steamer Webfoot. Each engine had a bore of 17 in (431.8 mm) and stroke of 7 ft (2.13 m). In January 1878, new boilers were built for the Hayward and another sternwheeler, the New Tenino, at the Willamette Iron Works. Each boiler would be 30 feet long and contain 150 tubes, each 2.5 inches in diameter.

Hayward was said to "dwarf" all other boats on the river in size. The vessel has been described as having "good cabins and comfortable parlors."

== Launch ==
Hayward was launched on May 31, 1871. The boat was later towed upriver to the O.S.N. dock, where on the afternoon of July 31, 1871, the boiler was installed. Hayward was then taken back downriver to the O.S.N. boatyard (called the "boneyard" because of the accumulation of old steamers there) for completion. Hayward made its trial trip on September 28 of the same year.

== Initial service on the Columbia ==
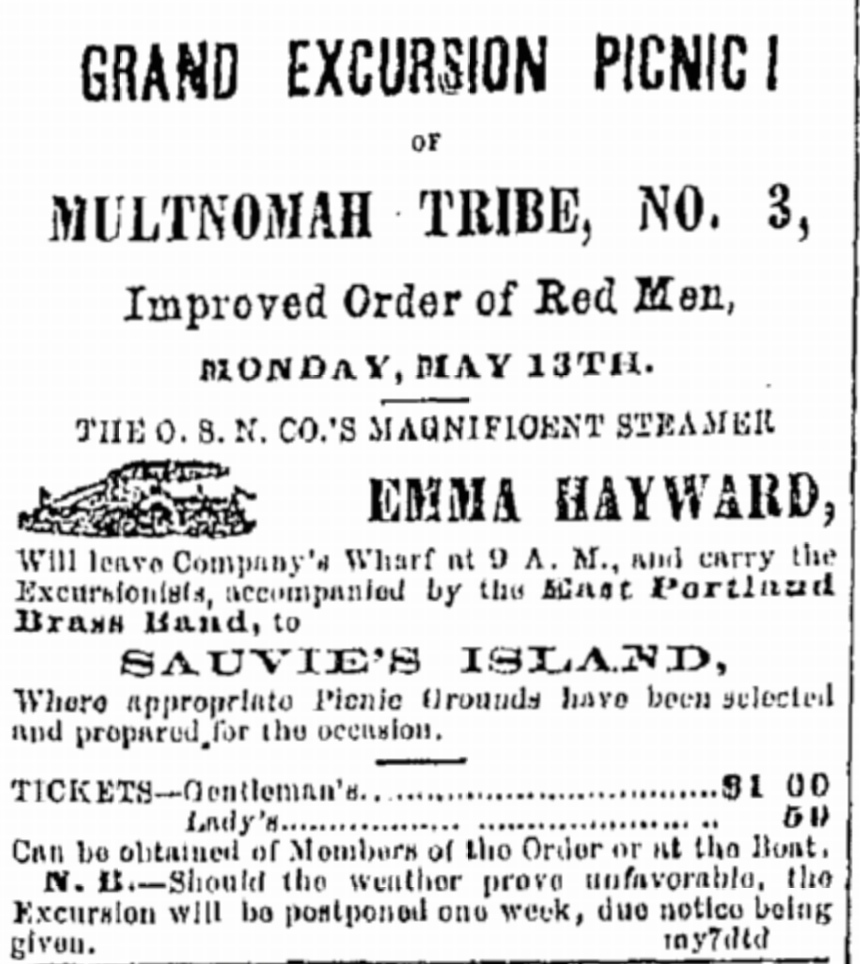
Advertisement published May 8, 1872, for an excursion of the Improved Order of Red Men to Sauvie Island.

Emma Hayward was first placed in service, for a short time, on the Columbia on the route to the Cascades, taking the place of the sidewheeler Oneonta. This was to allow Oneonta to be laid up for repairs.

The route from Portland to the Cascades was 86 miles long. As of July 1872, Hayward was on this route, running daily except Sundays, for which the passenger fare was $2.50. According to the July 1872 schedule, Hayward departed Portland at 5:00 a.m. for Vancouver, departed Vancouver at 6:30 a.m., and arrived at the Cascades at 10:30 a.m. Returning, Hayward was scheduled, perhaps optimistically, to depart the Cascades at 10:30 a.m., the same minute as the boat arrived, return to Vancouver by 2:00 p.m., and from there back to Portland by 3:30 in the afternoon.

Hayward was later reassigned to the Portland-Astoria run, where the vessel served for the next ten years. In the first years on this run, the Hayward ran on alternating days with the "less elegant" Dixie Thompson, also built in 1871.

As of August 12, 1873, the Haywood ran downriver to Astoria every Monday, Wednesday, and Friday, and returned to Portland the following day. At the same time, the alternate boat, Dixie Thompson left Astoria for Portland every Monday, Wednesday, and Friday, returning to Astoria the next day. The Portland terminus of the run was at the O.S.N. dock at the foot of Ash street.

Haywood was also reported to have been engaged in towing work in 1873, towing the brig Orient up the Columbia on October 27, 1873. Orient was carrying iron for the Northern Pacific Railroad, to complete its line into Tacoma, W.T.

Although considered a luxury passenger vessel, Hayward also transported livestock, such as 30 head of mules on April 30, 1875, from Portland to Kalama, W.T.

On one trip, on April 17, 1876, Hayward made 44 landings on the trip downriver from Portland to Astoria. In later years on this route, Hayward was placed in service as a night passenger boat.

== Competition from Ben Holladay ==
In the early 1870s, the Oregon Steam Navigation Company, which for about 10 years had held a monopoly on river transport on the Columbia, was challenged by the People’s Transportation Company, which was controlled by the unscrupulous businessman Ben Holladay.

In 1874, Holladay put the sternwheelers Willamette Chief and the newly constructed Beaver in competition with the Hayward and another O.S.N boat, the Josie McNear. As a result of the competition, passenger fares were driven down to $1, and freight rates were lowered to $1 a ton. There were numerous collisions between the rival vessels. One of these collisions, between the Hayward and the Beaver, was reported to have been "serious." By 1876, however, the O.S.N. had bested Holladay and acquired all of his boats.

== Speed ==
When built, Emma Hayward was said to have been the finest boat on the lower Columbia river. For a time, Emma Hayward was the fastest vessel on the river. As of December 1878, Hayward’s fastest time from Portland to Vancouver, a distance of 18 miles, was 65 minutes.

== Ownership change ==
In 1879, the Oregon Steam Navigation Company sold most of its assets, including Hayward and other vessels, to the Oregon Railway and Navigation Company. The O.R.&N had just completed a rail line along the Columbia river, making it difficult for the steamboats to compete for business. The formal deed of sale was executed and filed with the office of the Multnomah County clerk on March 31, 1880. As a result of the sale, the O.R & N controlled every steamboat of note on the Columbia River except for the Lurline, owned by Jacob Kamm, and a few smaller vessels operating on routes out of Portland.

== Rescue of the Edith ==
On March 10, 1880, the towboat Edith was proceeding upriver under the command of Capt. Archie Pease. Edith was towing a log raft when the boat caught fire when the vessel had nearly reached St. Helens. The fire was discovered in the wood around the boiler, and it was this proximity which apparently caused the blaze. The wood was packed so tightly that it couldn't be removed to be thrown overboard. It was necessary to cut loose from the log raft and beach the vessel.

The crew on Edith saw the Emma Hayward coming upriver, and signaled to the sternwheeler, and the larger vessel, with Captain Babbidge at the wheel, came to the aid of the beached towboat. The crew on Hayward hooked up the firehose to the steam pumps, and used it to spray water on the Edith. Even so, it was still necessary to cut two holes in the towboat's deck to extinguish the fire.

Edith probably would have been destroyed had Emma Hayward not intervened. As it was, damage to Edith was estimated at $500. The log raft was secured by the dispatch of a small steamer from St. Helens.

== Fare war with Fleetwood ==
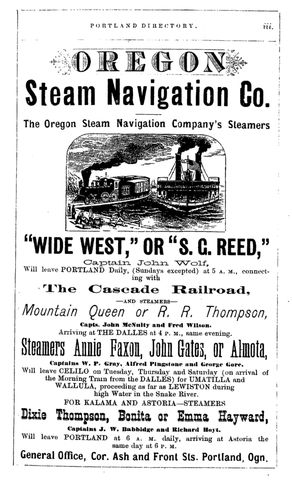
Advertisement for the steamers, including Emma Hayward, by the Oregon Steam Navigation Company, circa 1878.

The O.R.&N did not complete the eastbound rail line out of Portland until 1882. During the interval between the O.R.& N's acquisition of the O.S.N. fleet in 1880 and completion of the railway in 1882, river traffic was booming, and profits were very great, even though fares were much lower than under the O.S.N. In May 1881 the O.R.& N’s river division had gross revenue of $178,450, and net revenue, after deducting all expenses, was $88,450. By comparison, Emma Hayward was valued at $10,000 on July 1, 1881. For the fiscal year ending June 30, 1881, the O.R. & N's river division carried 131,665 passengers and 422,082 tons of freight.

This level of profit attracted competitors, of which the most capable was Captain U.B. Scott, who, with his associates, had been very successful in operations on the Willamette river. Scott and his allies set up a competitor to the O.R.&N, using the newly built propeller-driven Fleetwood on the Columbia below the Cascades, and competing above the Cascades with the Gold Dust, which they had hauled overland around the rapids at the Cascades.

The O.R.&N. responded with a tactic typical of its predecessor, the Oregon Steam Navigation Company, that is, a predatory rate cut. O.R. & N. cut fares from Portland to The Dalles down to 50 cents. But Fleetwood was so much faster than the O.R.& N’s boat on the lower river, the Dixie Thompson, that Scott was able to meet the competition for several weeks, but eventually the big company overwhelmed him on the middle Columbia, and Scott was forced to sell Gold Dust to the O.R.&N.

This however left Scott with Fleetwood on the lower river, which included the now-booming route to Astoria. The growing demand for riverine transport was fueled by the rapidly developing salmon and logging industries. Fleetwood cut two hours off the time on the Astoria route, and forced the O.R.& N to run not one but four boats against Scott’s steamer. Emma Hayward and Bonita, plus whatever freight they could quickly load, followed along behind Fleetwood trying to pick up passengers from the landings, while the slower Dixie Thompson and Willamette Chief picked up whatever freight that Hayward and Bonita could not load. This was very expensive for the O.R.& N, which was forced to reduce fares on the route from $5 to $2.

== Transfer to Puget Sound ==
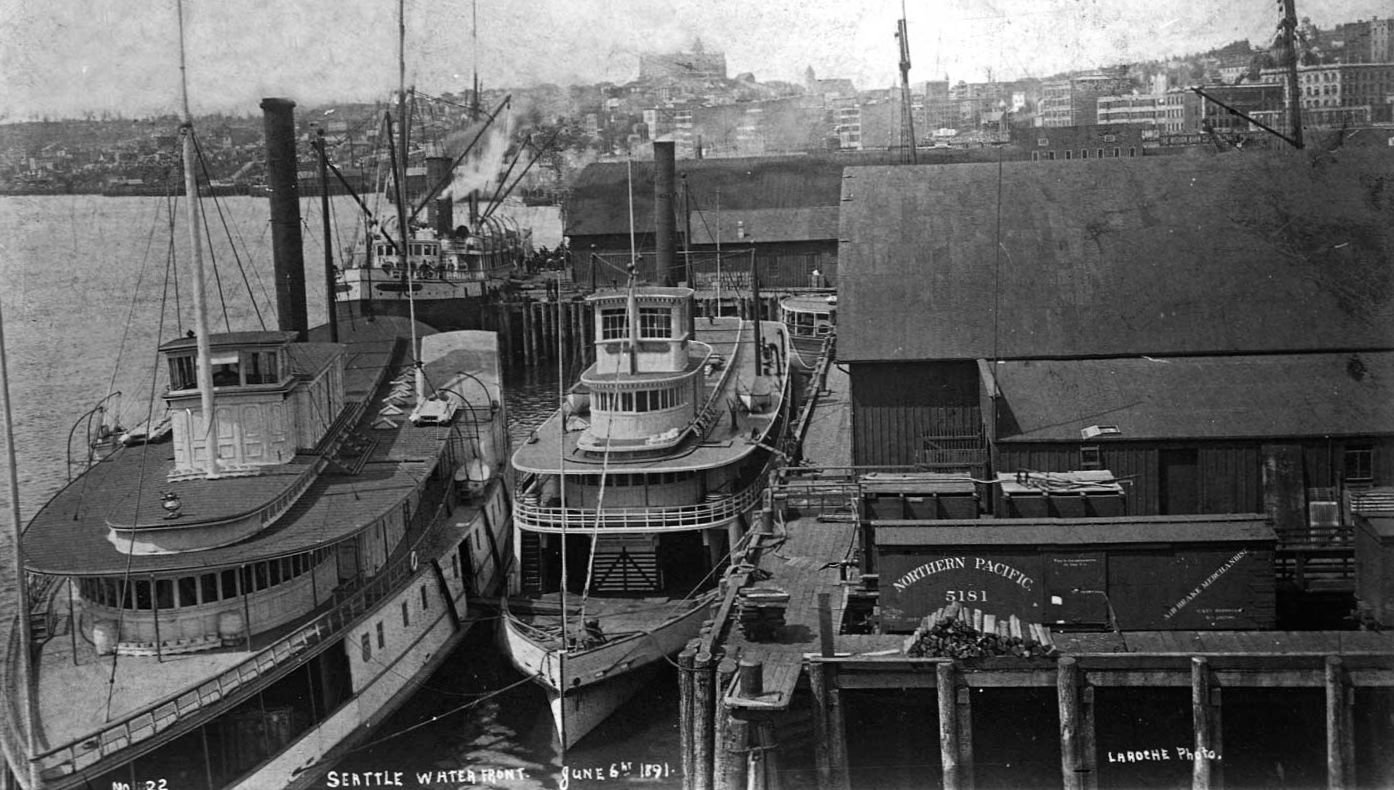
Emma Hayward, center (next to pier), moored in Seattle, June 6, 1891. Large steamer on left is T.J. Potter.

The O.R.&N wished to expand its newly acquired steamboat operations to Puget Sound. To this end in 1882, under Capt. J.E. Denny and Engineer Pardun, the Hayward was taken out across the Columbia Bar into the open Pacific Ocean and then around the Olympic Peninsula, arriving in Seattle on October 24, 1882. Business was booming on the Sound, and the Hayward handled "an immense traffic", making a round trip every day from Olympia to Tacoma, where a connection would be made with the trains of the Northern Pacific Railway.

As of October 15, 1887, Emma Hayward was placed on a schedule running from Seattle to Olympia. Under the new schedule, Emma Hayward would run daily except Sunday, departing Seattle at 4:00 a.m, and reaching Tacoma at 6:15 a.m., where connections would be made with the train running to Portland. The boat would then proceed to Olympia, reaching that port at 11:30 a.m. Departing Olympia at 1:00 p.m., the boat would reach Tacoma at 4:00 p.m., and remain there until 6:30 p.m. to connect with the train coming from Portland. After that, the steamer would return to Seattle, arriving at 8:45 p.m.

On April 21, 1889, the Hayward began making regular runs from Tacoma to Whatcom.

When newer, faster, and finer vessels, such as the City of Kingston and the big sidewheeler Olympian began to be placed in service on the Sound, the Hayward was relegated to secondary status. Hayward also worked on Bellingham Bay and ran between Seattle and Tacoma.

One of the masters of the Hayward while on Puget Sound was the Captain Theophilus Green (1848–1910), who commanded a number of sternwheelers on the Sound, and trained many men who later became steamboat masters themselves. Green himself was to later perish in the pilot house of the propeller Vashonian, dropping dead just after he gave the signal over the engine room telegraph to stop engines at Chautauqua Landing on Vashon Island.

== Transport of troops to suppress anti-Chinese riots ==
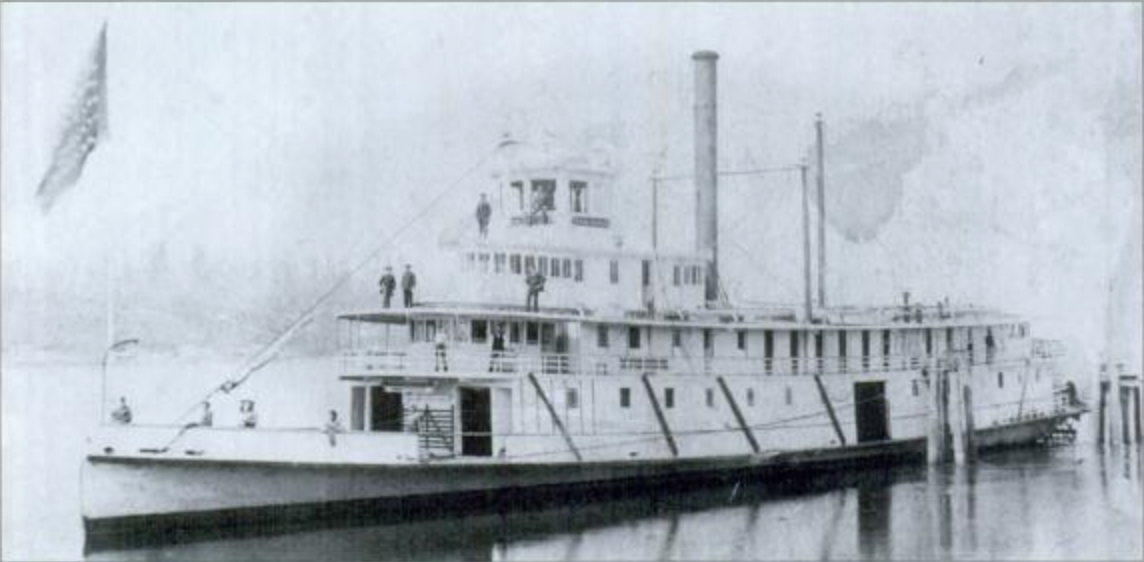
Emma Hayward probably on Puget Sound, between 1882 and 1891.

As a result of anti-Chinese riots in Seattle in early 1886, President Grover Cleveland declared martial law, and ordered Gen. John Gibbon to proceed to the city with 300 troops to suppress the rioting. The troops, consisting of eight companies of the 14th Infantry regiment, under the command of Lt. Col. I.D. De Russey, were transported to Seattle on the Emma Hayward. They arrived at about 3:00 pm on February 10, 1886. They were met at the pier by a detachment of the Home Guards and the Seattle Rifles.

== Loss of deckhand ==
On June 18, 1891, somewhere en route from Whatcom to Tacoma, a deckhand fell overboard from the Hayward. It was not known where the man had disappeared from the vessel, nor was it determined whether the hand had fallen overboard or committed suicide.

== Return to the Columbia ==
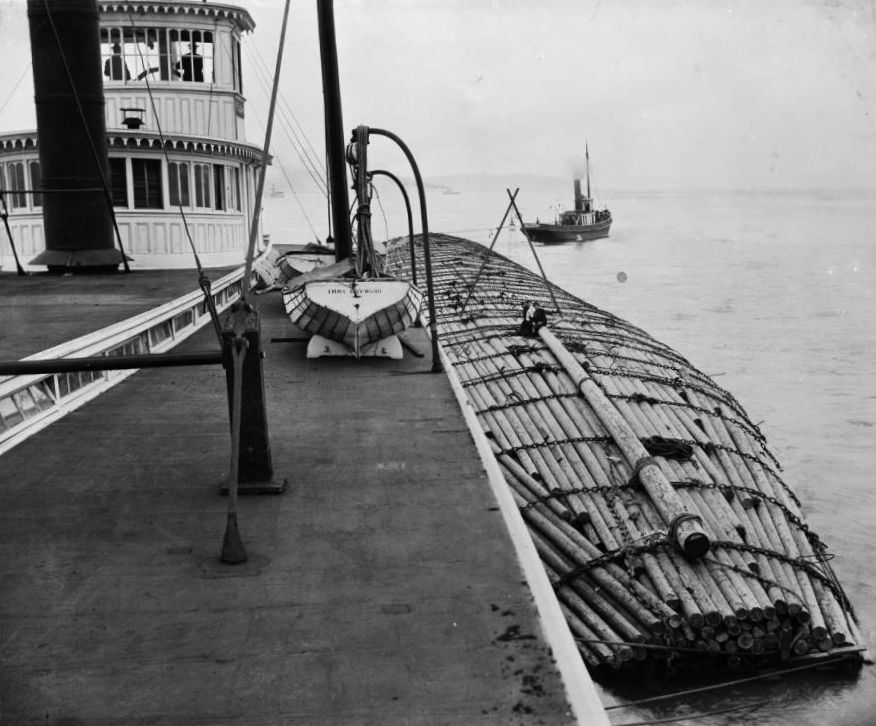
Emma Hayward with a Benson raft in tow.

A few months before September 1891, Hayward sustained a broken stern wheel shaft in an accident while bound from Whatcom to Seattle. At this time, the boat was owned by the Union Pacific and operated as part of the railroad’s steamship division. After the accident, Hayward was towed to Tacoma, where Union Pacific port captain, one Clancy, ordered that repairs be made. This required the sternwheel to be removed from the boat.

Work was suspended after the wheel was removed. The new Union Pacific Puget Sound port captain, E.R. Rathbone, decided to send Hayward to the Columbia River. On September 25, 1891, Hayward was towed from Tacoma to Seattle, where immediate preparations were made for the boat be towed to the Columbia, with the departure scheduled to occur on September 29, 1891.

According to a Seattle newspaper, the reason for the transfer was that "the people of the Sound demand more elegant and faster means of navigation than is afforded in steamers of the Hayward’s class."

Hayward was towed back around to the Columbia river by the large ocean-going steam tug Escort, also known as Escort No. 2 (built 1882; 146 tons). This was the first time in the history of the Northwest that a sternwheeler had made the voyage without a wheel in place and without having steam up. Sternwheel propelled-boats, in addition to being lightly built for inland work, would have difficulty keeping the sternwheel in the water as ocean swells would lift the paddles clear from the water. Towing was expected to alleviate these difficulties.

Hayward and Escort No. 2 arrived in Astoria in September. Upon return to the Columbia, Hayward was placed into service as a towboat.

== Towboat work ==
Use as a towboat appears not to have prevented Hayward from being used as a troop transport. On September 15, 1892, the boat transported five companies of the 14th infantry regiment from Portland to Vancouver. The companies were returning from the Coeur d’Alene mines, where they had been stationed for two months.

Wheat grown in the farming regions of the Pacific Northwest was an important export from Portland. Towboats like Emma Hayward played their role. For example, on November 16, 1894, Hayward towed out the British three-masted ship Evesham Abbey, loaded with wheat, from Portland downstream to Astoria.

Hayward remained a useful vessel for a long time. For example, on September 28, 1898, Emma Hayward brought the British ship Lord Kinnaird upriver from Astoria in 12 hours, picking up the tow at 8:00 a.m. and reaching Portland at 8:00 p.m. This was not a record-breaking time, but it was considered good for a vessel as old as Hayward.

== Last years ==
Until about 1900, Hayward was owed by the O.R.&N. In 1900, the O.R.&N sold Hayward to the Shaver Transportation Company. The Shaver firm removed the engines, installed them into another vessel, reportedly the Sarah Dixon. The Shaver firm then moored the hulk at the foot of Washington Street in Portland, and used it as a workshop and storeroom.

On June 5, 1905, the Shavers sold the unpowered Hayward to Capt. James Good, who owned two small propeller-driven steamers, both built in 1899, America (99 tons) and Republic (88 tons). Good planned to dismantleHayward, and convert it into a barge to transport slabwood into Portland. The conversion work was to be done in St. Helens, Oregon.

== See also ==
- Steamboats of the Columbia River
- Puget Sound Mosquito Fleet
