= John J. Holland =

American ship builder (1843–1893)

Captain John Joseph Holland
- Born: April 15, 1843; Saint John, New Brunswick, British North America
- Died: January 28, 1893; Ballard, Washington
- Occupation: Ship Builder
- Spouse: Anna J. Holland née Foster
- Children: Thomas, James, William, Anna, Mamy, Johnnie

Captain John Joseph Holland was a shipbuilder in the Pacific Northwest in the late 19th century. Among the vessels he built at his yards were the sternwheel steamboat Fairhaven in 1889, and, in 1890, the famous sternwheeler Bailey Gatzert.

== Early life ==
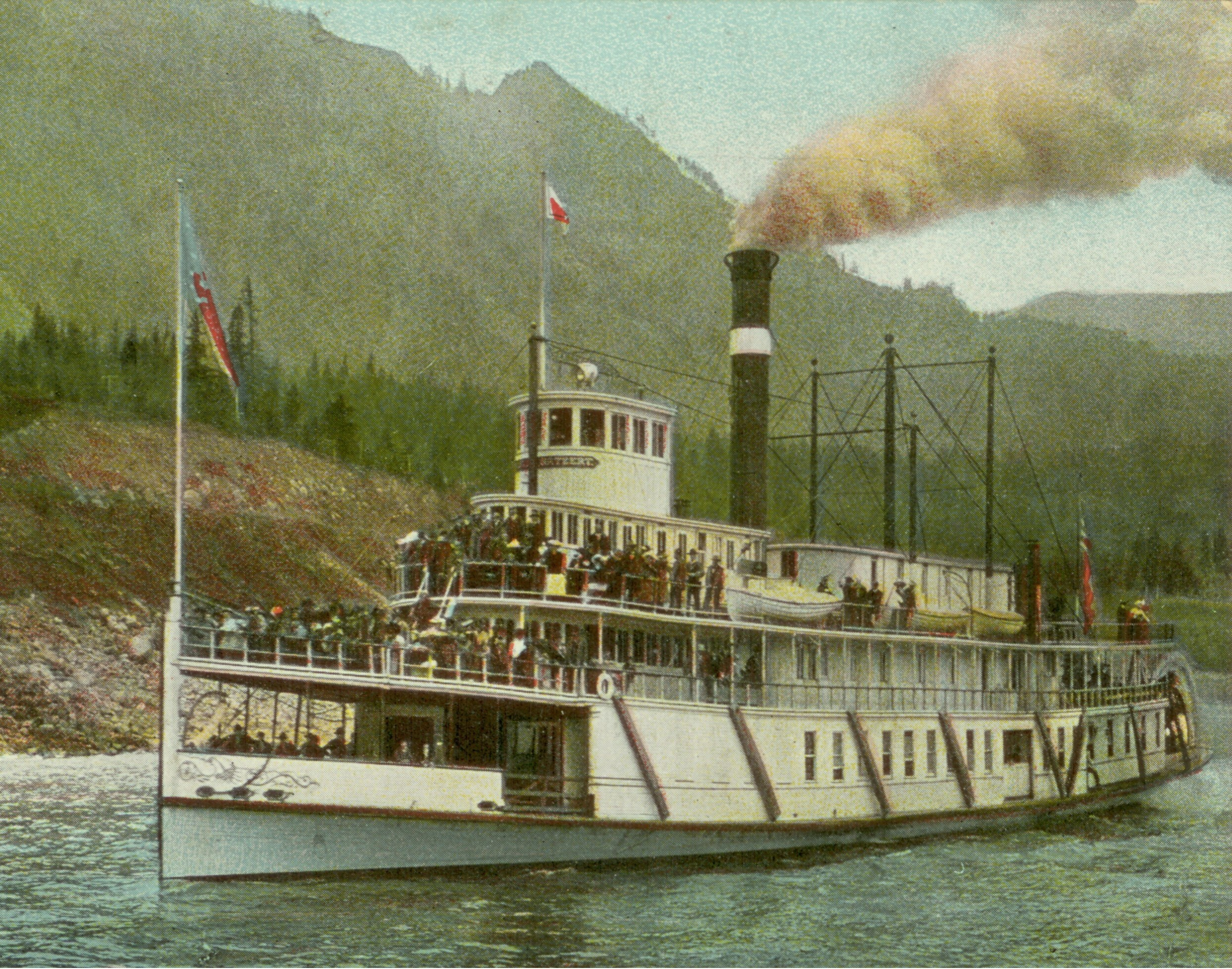
Bailey Gatzert near Cascade Locks on the Columbia River, circa 1910

Captain Holland was born in Saint John, New Brunswick, Canada on April 15, 1843. He learned his trade as a shipbuilder at Saint John. From age 23 to 25 there are records of him sailing as an able-bodied seaman on multiple trips between Saint John and Liverpool and London.

He emigrated to the United States and moved to The Dalles, Oregon on the Columbia River. He found a job with the Oregon Railway and Navigation Company, and married Anna J. Foster there. Holland later moved to Portland, Oregon with the same company, where he became the Chief Builder. While working in Portland, he built the steamships Wide West, R.R. Thompson, Idaho, Daisy Ainsworth, Rainier, and Emma Hayward.. Captain Holland's half-brother, Phillip, was with him in Oregon and also involved in shipping. Unfortunately, he was mortally injured in a collision between the steam launch Mikado and an Oregon and California Railroad ferry on October 26, 1886. He died 65 days later.

== Puget Sound years ==
After years on the Columbia River, Holland had developed a specialty in shallow-draft and coastal vessels, especially river craft. He moved to Tacoma, Washington in 1887 where he built a number of such vessels including the steamers State of Washington, Skagit Chief, and Fairhaven. In 1889 he moved again, this time to Ballard, Washington, where he started a new shipyard on Salmon Bay. In December 1889 he employed a gang of men to remove stumps and level the site on Shilshole Avenue before ship building could begin. In 1890 his shipyard employed 23 workers. In this new yard he built Monte Cristo, Bailey Gatzert, Cascade and Frances Henry. His Ballard ship yard also repaired vessels including Henry Bailey, Josephine, Fanny Lake, Wasco, Mabel, Detroit, and State of Washington.

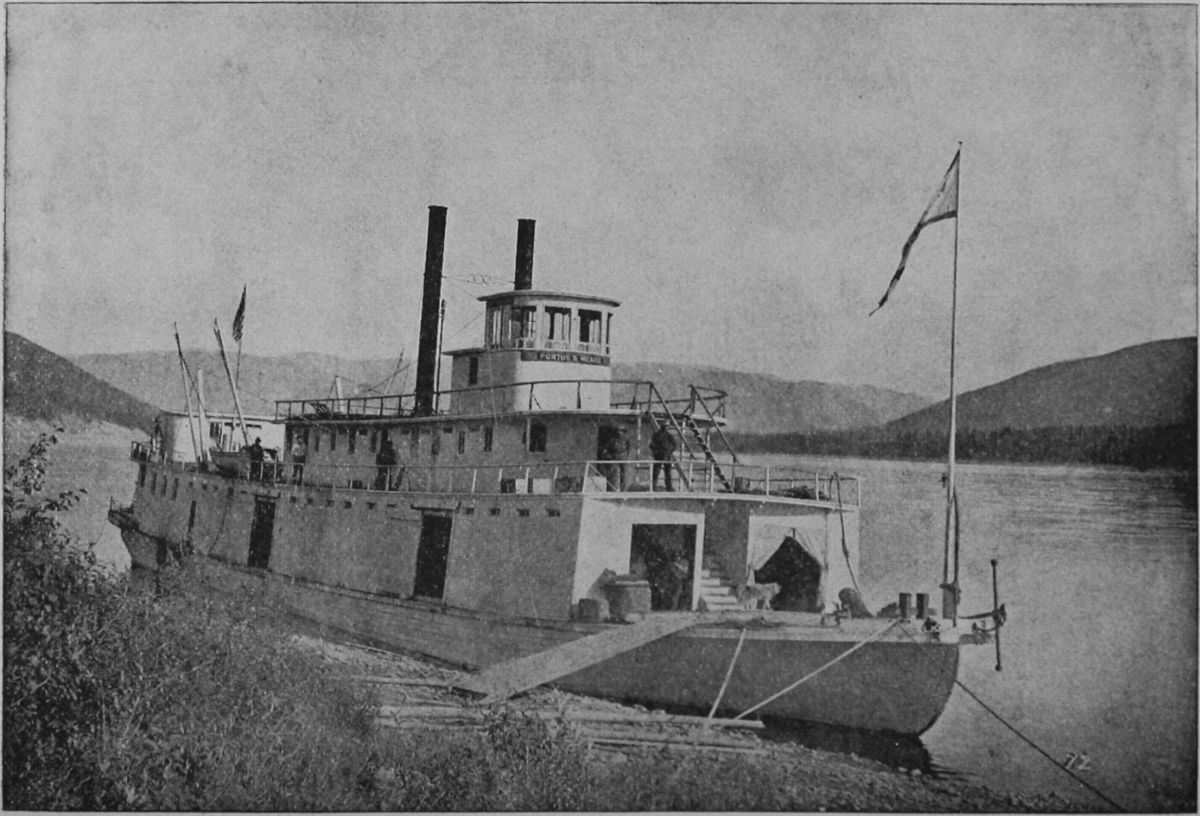
Portus B. Weare, the last vessel built by John Holland, ca. 1895

== Decline and death ==
In 1892 he was commissioned to build a steamer for Yukon River service. He produced the parts of the ship, Portus B. Weare, in Ballard and then traveled to the St. Michael, Alaska trading post of the North American Transportation and Trading Company to assemble the ship. Presumably, the river craft was deemed unseaworthy to make the ocean crossing from Ballard to the Yukon.

Holland, sailed north on July 6, 1892 on Alice Blanchard, with a crew of builders from his shipyard, parts for the new steamer, and Portus B. Weare, an executive of the company for whom the ship was named. The ship was launched September 17, 1892. Living in a tent on St. Michael, Holland was taken ill and returned to Ballard in October in poor health. In December he contracted typhoid fever. While recovering, he died of pneumonia on January 28, 1893. He left behind his wife and six children, ages 18 to 1 1/2.
