= Portus B. Weare =

19th c. American steamship

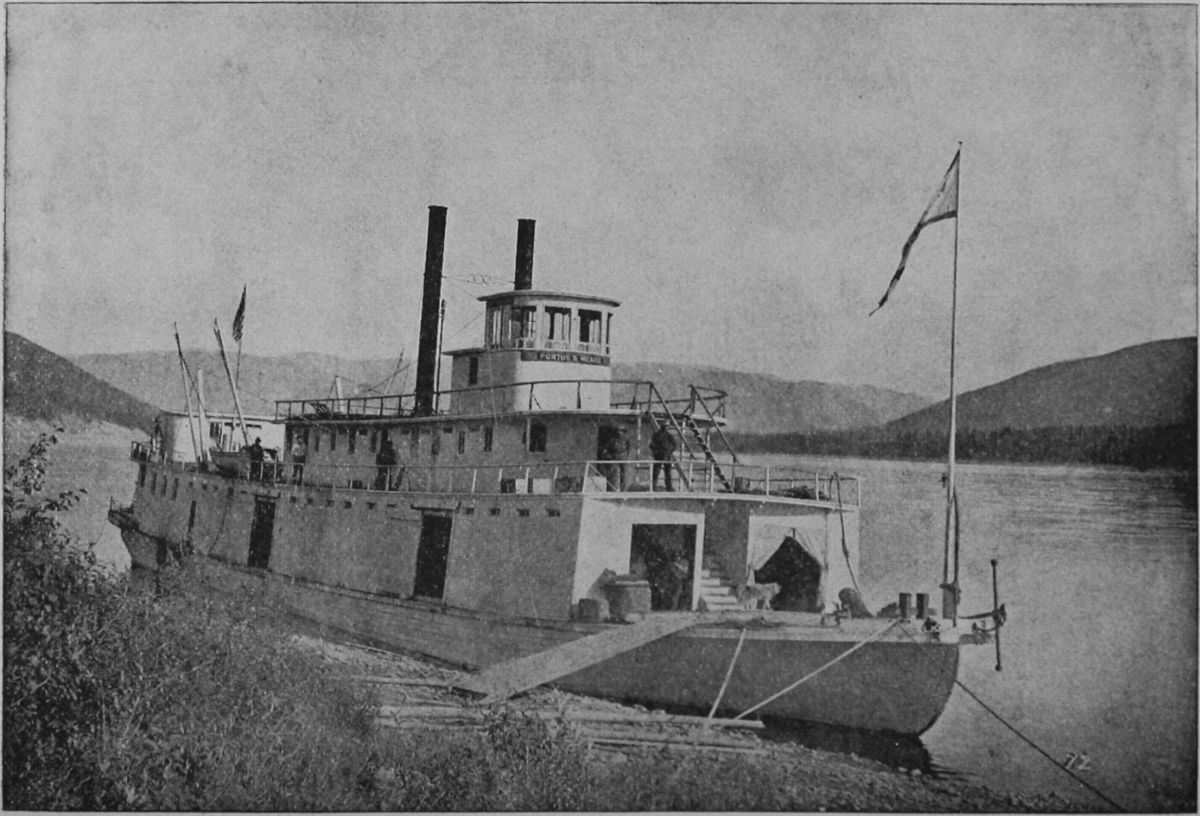
- Portus B. Weare ca. 1895

History
- Name: Portus B. Weare
- Owner: North American Transportation and Trading Company
- Route: St. Michael, Alaska - Dawson City, Yukon
- Builder: John J. Holland
- Launched: September 17, 1892
- Out of service: 1912
- Fate: Abandoned 1926 or 1927

General characteristics
- Type: Sternwheel steamship
- Tonnage: 400 GRT
- Length: 175 feet (53 m)
- Beam: 28 feet (8.5 m)
- Draft: 4 feet (1.2 m)
- Installed power: 230 Horsepower
- Crew: 22

Portus B. Weare was a wooden sternwheel steamship built in 1892 for service on the Yukon River. She played a notable role in the Klondike gold rush, being the second ship to bring news of the Klondike gold strike and an estimated $1 million in gold down the river in 1897. This set off the gold rush. The vessel carried freight and passengers up the Yukon to Dawson City and later Fairbanks. She was abandoned in 1926 or 1927, after the need for steamboat transport to the interior declined.

== Construction ==
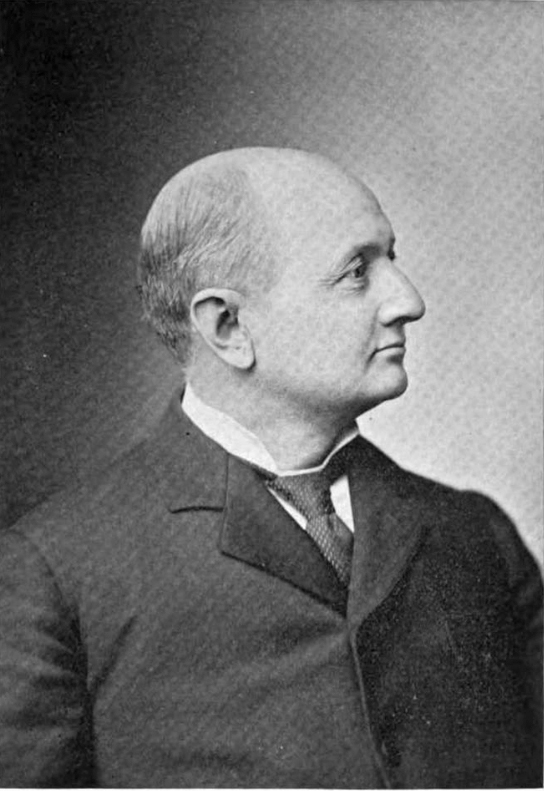
Chicago Businessman Portus B. Weare

Portus Baxter Weare was born in a log cabin at Otsego, Michigan, then a remote settlement. His wilderness childhood led him into an early career as a fur trader. He met Captain John Jerome Healy at his trading post at Fort Benton, Montana and the two men began to work together in the fur trade. By the mid-1880s, many of the peltries were in decline due to over hunting, so Weare moved on to grain trading in Chicago. He was a success, and became wealthy. He was a member of the Chicago Board of Trade for over forty years.

In 1892 Healy visited Weare at his Chicago office. They had not seen each other since 1874, but subsequent actions suggest there was a trusting relationship between the two. Healy had moved from Montana to Dyea, Alaska and established a trading post. There he met prospectors returning from the interior who brought news of the Fortymile gold strike in the Yukon drainage. Healy was searching for financing to exploit this find and turned to his old friend Weare to propose an investment. To back up his story, Healy placed a buckskin bag of gold dust and nuggets on Weare's desk. Healy succeeded in raising $50,000 to start the venture. Weare, Healy, and John and Michael Cudahy, fellow members of the Chicago Board of Trade, founded the North American Transportation and Trading Company. Weare was named chairman of the board of directors. The goal of the company was not to mine for gold, but to provide goods and services to the anticipated rush of miners in the same way that Weare traded with fur trappers and grain farmers.

Weare, Healy, Weare's son, William, Captain J. C. Barr, and Charles H. Hamilton set off to Seattle. Here Weare contracted with John J. Holland, a well-regarded shipwright, to build a steamer that could travel upstream from the Pacific Ocean to the gold fields in the Yukon. The Weares, Healy, Holland and a crew of 14 of his shipyard workers, all the materials for the ship, the ways on which to build it, and 300 tons of trade goods and supplies were loaded onto the schooner-rigged steamship Alice Blanchard. She sailed north on July 6, 1892 and reached St. Michael Island, about 80 miles north of the mouth of the Yukon, on August 10, 1892.

A settlement on St. Michael Island, called St. Michael, was founded by the Russian-American Company in 1835 to trade with Yupik natives, but by 1892 it had been taken over by the Alaska Commercial Company. Weare had hoped to use this trading post as a base for his shipyard, but the Alaska Commercial Company had a virtual monopoly on the Yukon steamship business and saw Weare as a competitor. It refused to cooperate. The Alice Blanchard was forced to anchor two miles offshore and to ferry supplies to the beach in the ship's boats and a 40' scow built on site. Weare started a new trading post about a mile north of St. Michael. It took a month to unload at Weare's new settlement, which was dubbed Fort Get There.

Holland and his crew had completed parts for the ship at his Ballard shipyard before sailing north, so rather than building it from raw materials, the job at Fort Get There was to assemble the parts. Even this task was fraught with difficulty, however, because the competitors at the Alaska Commercial Company tried to hire Holland's men at double their wages. Thankfully for Holland and Weare, the US Revenue Cutter Bear sailed in to St Michael. Its captain, Michael A. Healy, was reported to have threatened the laborers with hanging if they did not get to work, and offered some of Bear's tools and crew to help with the job. Nonetheless, it is a testament to Holland's skill that, despite the complete lack of any facilities and the labor unrest, the Portus B. Weare was launched on September 17, 1892, less than two months after arriving on St. Michael Island. She was 175 feet long, but drew only 4 feet of water when fully loaded (and a mere 16 inches without freight aboard), allowing her to safely navigate the shallow and uncharted river.

Weare, Holland, and fourteen other men not headed up the Yukon returned to San Francisco aboard Bear.

== Operation ==
Above all, navigation on the Yukon was a seasonal enterprise. The river froze over in late September or early October and became unnavigable until the ice broke up in June. Even when it was flowing, the river was deeper in the spring as the snow melted and shallower in the summer and fall. There were no charts, buoys, or other aids to navigation. Grounding on sand bars was a common occurrence and freight was often off-loaded to lighten the steamers sufficiently to refloat. As a rule, Yukon steamers did not run at night due to the navigational difficulties but this did not present much of a constraint because at the high latitudes of the Yukon it was light during most of the time the river was unfrozen. Portus B. Weare would typically take between two and three weeks to ascend the river from St. Michael to Dawson City, and somewhat less heading downstream. During her service on the Yukon she would typically make 2-3 round trips per season, but in at least one year made four deliveries to Dawson City. Steamers on the Yukon, including Portus B. Weare, often towed, pushed, or were lashed to barges to increase the freight they could move.

Portus B. Weare, like all the steamers on the river, was wood fired and would stop every six hours or so to pick up wood that had been precut and to gather driftwood. She burned 25 to 30 cords of wood per day when underway on the river. Captain Benjamin Franklin Horn earned the nickname "Driftwood" by grounding Portus B. Weare on a sand bar while engaged in gathering fuel. Passengers would often leave the ship to pick berries, hunt ducks, or just stretch their legs on shore while the crew was "wooding up". Mosquitoes were a constant complaint on these occasions.

=== 1892 - 1896 ===
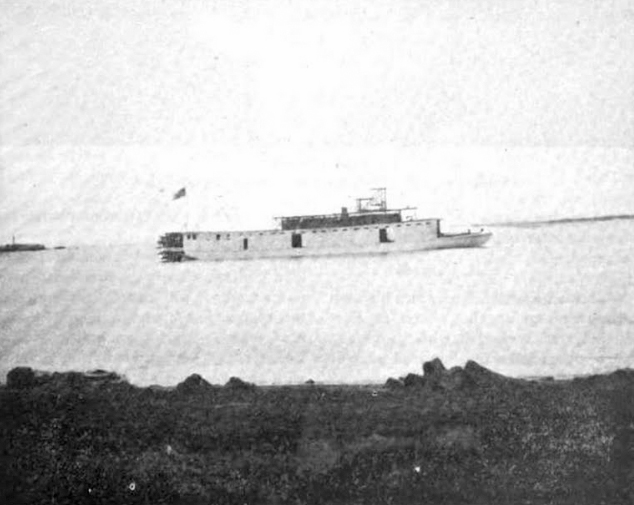
Portus B. Weare immediately after launch in September 1892 leaving St. Michael Island for the Yukon

Immediately after launching and sea trials, the new steamship was loaded with trade goods. Captain J. C. Barr and John Healy took her up the Yukon, crossing the bar at the river's north mouth on September 28, 1892. By October 1, Portus B. Weare was about 500 miles up the river, but by October 5, when she was about 800 miles up the Yukon, the thickness of the ice made further travel impossible. She was frozen in for the winter. Charles H. Hamilton snowshoed from the ship to Dyea via Chilkoot Pass, reaching Seattle on April 11, 1893. He reported the status of the venture to Weare in Chicago, and then returned to the St. Michael with another load of provisions for Portus B. Weare to take up the river in the spring of 1893. The energetic Hamilton later became secretary of the North American Transportation and Trading Company, and had one of its Yukon Steamers named after him.

After the break-up of the ice in the spring of 1893 made the Yukon navigable again, Healy went on to establish a new trading post, Fort Cudahy, near the mouth of the Fortymile River and stocked it with food and mining supplies carried by Portus B. Weare. Healy undercut the prices of the Alaska Commercial Company trading post across the river, and his goods sold well. During the winter of 1893 - 1894, the ship was moored in a slough near Fort Cudahy.

Healy sailed out of the interior in the fall of 1894 for the first time since ascending the Yukon on Portus B. Weare's first trip in 1892. He reported back to Weare in Chicago about his success selling goods to the miners. Additional capital was raised and Healy returned to St. Michael with more trade goods for the spring of 1895. With the additional capital, he had a second steamer built at Fort Get There, J.J. Healy, in 1895.

Placer gold strikes at Birch Creek and Fortymile River brought more miners to the region. The strikes also brought the North-West Mounted Police. There were several thousand men in the Canadian portion of the Yukon and, as of 1894, exactly one policeman. The Government of Canada correctly predicted that the new strikes would draw yet more miners to the region and decided to place a post on the river with 20 men. On July 5, 1895 Portus B. Weare left St. Michael with the Canadian contingent. The ship reached Fortymile River on July 24, 1895, and the Canadians unloaded their supplies near Fort Cudahy. The ship took eight of the men further upstream to Twelve Mile River where they cut timber which was floated back down to Fort Cudahy. The Mounties rented the North American Transportation and Trading Company sawmill there, and used the lumber they produced to build Fort Constantine, the first police post in the Yukon.

=== 1897: Klondike gold strike ===
Portus B. Weare spent the winter of 1896 - 1897 frozen in at Dawson City. The ice went out of the Yukon about June 15 and she started down the 1600 miles to the sea. On June 27, 1897, Portus B. Weare reached St. Michael with 60 miners on board and an estimated $1 million in gold dust and nuggets from the Klondike gold fields. She was the second steamer to bring news of the new strike, arriving two days after the Alaska Commercial Company's steamer Alice. When the miners and their gold reached Seattle and San Francisco, the Klondike gold rush began.

Portus B. Weare was loaded with passengers and 300 tons of provisions at St. Michael. She sailed up the river again on July 3, 1897. There was real concern that starvation could be a problem in the gold fields and the Alaska Commercial Company and the North American Transportation and Trading Company cooperated to get supplies to the interior before the river froze over in late September. She reached Dawson City On July 25, 1897. On her return voyage, she took more miners and their gold back to St. Michael. Twenty miles below Circle City, Alaska she grounded on a sand bar and was stuck there for 19 days. She was forced to shift her passengers to J.J. Healy to continue their journey. The ship took more than a month to reach St. Michael.

On her final passage up river in 1897 there was more trouble. When Portus B. Weare stopped at the company's trading post at Circle City she was boarded by a committee of the local miners. They were just as short of supplies as the miners in Dawson City and winter was approaching. After some unsatisfactory negotiations they decided to take what they wanted by force. On September 20, 1897, fifty armed miners surrounded the ship and began unloading supplies, taking 30 tons. Attempting to seem reasonable in their piracy, the miners took only what they believed they needed, so as not to starve other miners in Dawson City, paid for the goods, and even looted an Alaska Commercial Company steamer, Bella, so as not to seem unfair to either company. Despite all the obstacles in the voyage, Portus B. Weare did reach Dawson City before the river froze. Unfortunately, after the miners in Circle City helped themselves to her cargo, the supplies aboard skewed toward mining equipment and whiskey rather than food. Faced with potential scurvy and starvation in Dawson, the ship was loaded to over capacity with miners and sailed back down the river. The fee for the trip was $50. She did not make it back to St. Michael, for the river froze while she was en route. She spent the winter of 1897 - 1898 at Circle City. Many of her passengers took off in small boats and on foot.

The piracy on Portus B. Weare and other incidents where desperate miners had taken trading posts by force showed that Alaska and the Yukon were essentially lawless. The 20 Mounties at Fort Constantine were no match for tens of thousands of miners spread over hundreds of miles of wilderness. Understandably, Weare became concerned with security. He is reported to have purchased a Maxim machine gun in 1897 for Portland, the sea-going vessel he chartered for runs between Seattle and St. Michael. Nonetheless, the gold rush was undeniably good for business. The fare from Seattle to the goldfields, including board, was advertised at $1,000 in August 1897, but had been lowered to $700 by September.

=== 1898: Klondike gold rush ===
By 1898 the North American Transportation and Trading Company fleet had grown to six steamers. The company had offices at 618 First Avenue in Seattle, where it took bookings from Yukon bound travelers. It offered a complete suite of services to miners including ocean transport to St. Michael, a hotel at Fort Get There, river transport up the Yukon, food, mining supplies, and financing for mining ventures. It even had a rather unusual real estate business buying gold mines from departing miners to sell to newcomers. The company also offered employment to miners in the winter chopping wood to fuel the next year's steamboats. Its first ship headed to Alaska in 1898 left Seattle on June 10, and additional ships followed every ten days.

On a summer run from St. Michael to Dawson City in 1898, Portus B. Weare was loaded with whiskey. The ship was met by Portus B. Weare himself about 100 miles up the river. He had come overland via Chilkoot Pass. No doubt the whiskey would have sold well, but given the ongoing issue of food shortages in the interior, Weare ordered the ship back to St. Michael to change her cargo for more practical provisions. The ship finally left St. Michael on July 22, 1898, for her trip up the Yukon. She arrived at Dawson with 300 tons of freight in early August. She carried no passengers up river, so as not to exacerbate the potential of starvation in the gold fields during the coming winter.

=== 1899 - 1927 ===
In 1898 gold was found at Nome, and by the spring of 1899 the Nome gold rush had begun. The new strike diverted miners away from the Yukon gold fields. Steamboat traffic on the river slumped. The miners already in the Klondike had gold to spend, however. Portus B. Weare transported $1 million of gold earned by the trading posts of the North American Transportation and Trading Company down the Yukon in the spring of 1899.

Portus B. Weare spent the winter of 1900 - 1901 at St. Michael.

In 1903, traffic to the Klondike had fallen so far that the North American Transportation and Trading Company lost $400,000. Portus B. Weare had difficulties in his grain trading business at the same time, leading ultimately to his expulsion from the Chicago Board of Trade and personal bankruptcy. He was in no position to rescue the company he had initially financed. In 1904 the company closed three of its trading posts and leased its fleet of steamers to individual captains. A bit of good news came in 1902 when gold was discovered in Fairbanks, Alaska, on the Tanana River, a tributary of the Yukon about 900 miles from St. Michael. In these later years, supplying Fairbanks with goods from the outside became much more important than the gold fields.

In February 1911 the North American Transportation and Transport Company, including Portus B. Weare, was acquired by the Merchants' Yukon Line. At the time of the sale the estate of Michael Cudahy was the largest shareholder. One of the two partners who organized Merchants' Yukon Line was the same energetic Charles Hamilton who had walked out from the frozen-in Portus B. Weare in 1892. Under its new ownership, Portus B. Weare made the first delivery of the year of livestock to Fairbanks on July 10, 1911. This included 100 head of cattle and 75 - 80 hogs. It took her 15 days to reach Fairbanks from St. Michael. Two days later she headed back down the river to take cargo off another Merchants' Yukon Line steamer, J. P. Light. Off-loading the deeply laden vessel allowed the two ships to bring the full load up the shallow Tanana to Fairbanks. She returned to Fairbanks with another 200 tons of freight on July 19, 1911. By August 7, 1911 Portus B. Weare was back at St. Michael.

The ship may never have sailed again. Although still documented by the Bureau of Navigation, she was listed as not operating in 1912. Portus B. Weare was abandoned at St. Michael in 1926 or 1927. At the time she was one of the oldest steamers on the river and her design and machinery were obsolete. Furthermore, the Alaska Railroad had reached Fairbanks, reducing the need for steamboat transportation to the interior.

== Captains ==
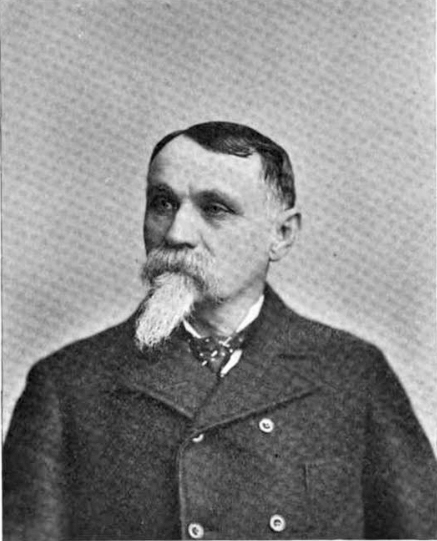
Captain John J. Healy

Historical sources give us a partial list of the captains of Portus B. Weare. The title "captain" is somewhat ambiguous in that it was applied to both the master in charge of the vessel and the pilot, who focused only on the tricky navigation of the river.

1892: Captain John Jerome ("Johnny") Healy, the general manager of the North American Transportation and Trading Company, is credited by some sources as taking the vessel up the Yukon immediately after its construction. Other sources credit Captain John Christie Barr, who was without doubt also an important figure at the company since it named one of its later ships after him. In fact, one captain may have acted as master, while the other acted as pilot.

1895: Captain William E. Geiger

1898: Captain E. D. Dixon served briefly, but clashed with John Healy. He quit and joined the Alaska Commercial Company as a steamship captain. Captain John Christie Barr is also listed aboard Portus B. Weare in 1898.

1899: Captain Benjamin Franklin ("Frank") Horn earned the nickname ""Driftwood" by grounding Portus B. Weare while collecting fuel for the boilers. Captain Thomas A. Hoy is also listed aboard in 1899.

1906: Captain John M. Gilham

1907: Captain A. Medley

1911: Captain Thomas S. Haynes as Master with Captain Patterson as Pilot
