= Willamette Chief =

Sternwheel steamboat built in 1874

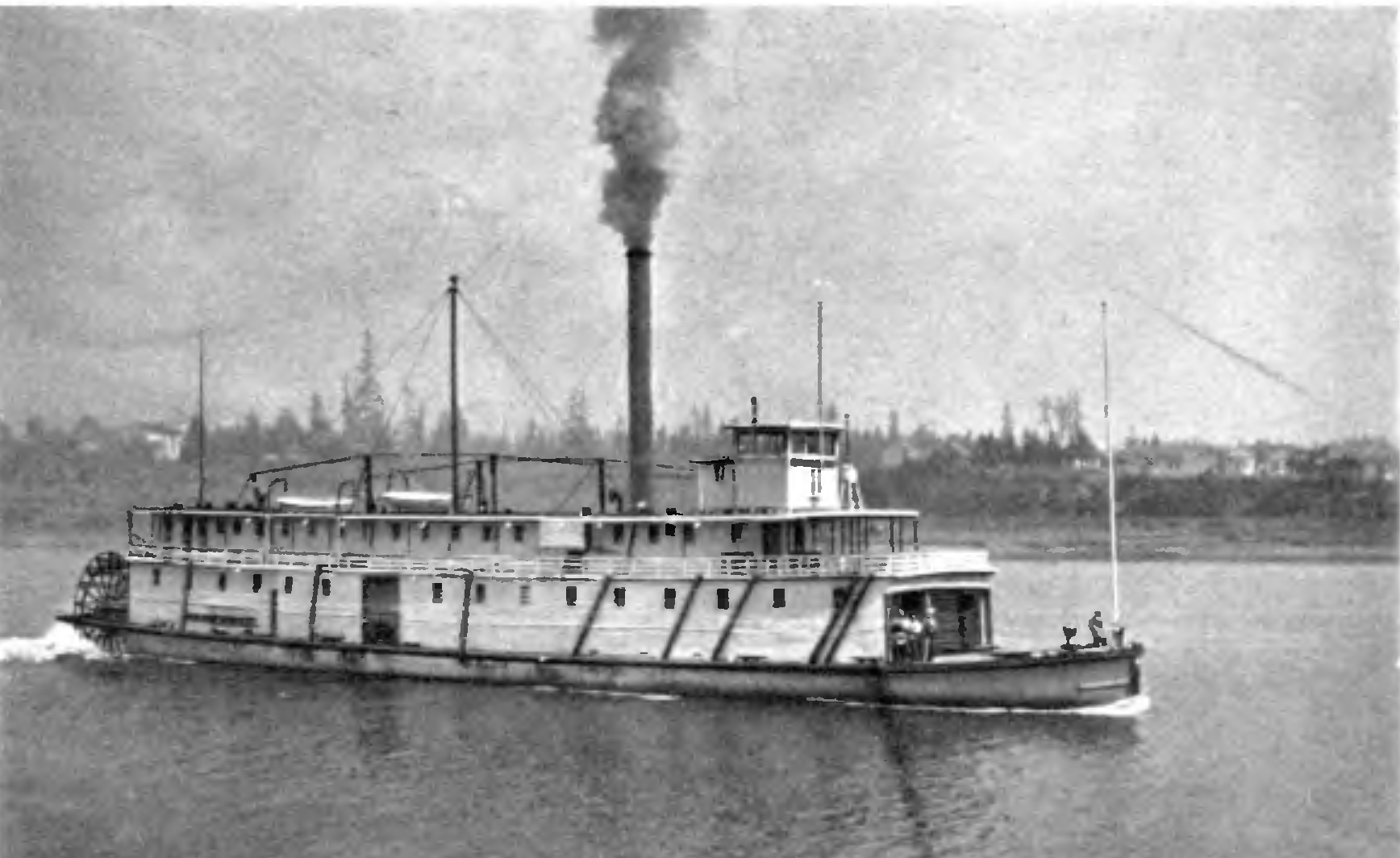
- Willamette Chief
- Owner: Willamette River Navigation Co., Oregon Steam Navigation Co.
- Route: Willamette River
- Builder: J.F. Steffen* of Portland, Oregon
- Maiden voyage: March 23, 1874
- Identification: US registry #80405; #80701 (after rebuild)
- Fate: 1894, burned at Portland
- Type: shallow draft inland passenger/freighter
- Tonnage: 586 gross; after rebuild 524 or 693
- Length: 163 ft (49.7 m)
- Beam: 31.0 ft (9.4 m); after rebuild: 31.0 ft (9 m)
- Depth: 6.0 ft (1.8 m) depth of hold; after rebuild: 6.0 ft (2 m)
- Installed power: steam, twin high pressure horizontally mounted, single-cylinder engines, 20" bore by 60" stroke, 26 horsepower nominal
- Propulsion: sternwheel

Willamette Chief was a sternwheel steamboat built in 1874 for the Willamette River Navigation Company.

== Design and construction ==
The builders of Willamette Chief intended her to run from Astoria, Oregon to the headwaters of the Willamette to break the monopoly on Willamette steam navigation traffic that had been achieved by the People's Transportation Company. Under the name of the Astoria Farmers' Wharf Company, some of stockholders of the Willamette River Transportation Company had built a wharf in Astoria to allow ready transfer of wheat and other farm products to ocean-going ships, and Willamette Chief was going to be the inland transportation link in this chain of commerce they had envisioned. She was considered to be strongly built and a good cargo hauler, with a shallow draft to allow her to work as far inland as possible.

== Monopoly-breaker and wheat boat ==
After completion, Willamette Chief the largest boat of the company, was placed on the run up the Willamette River to Albany and Corvallis. When Willamette Chief first came downriver to Astoria she carried 200 tons of wheat and thirty farmers. More people, mostly farmers, 130 in all, boarded at Albany and Salem. Joseph Nathan Teal, known for some reason as "Colonel Teal", an early Oregon businessman and a staunch advocate of low steamer rates, was also aboard:

Teal had become an inveterate speech maker and hopeful breaker of monopolies and was always around when a new steamboat company tried to elbow its way into the business of the river. On the Willamette Chief he made a speech, envisioning things to come when all the valley wheat from all the valley farms would go direct to Astoria for only four dollars a ton, there to be shipped to a hungry world. Prosperity would follow, and the voice of the turtle would be heard in the land. Somehow both prosperity and the dove got lost in the shuffle.

Captain Charles Holman and engineer John Marshall were in charge of the vessel on the first trip. The next year Ephraim W. Baughman took command. In December 1875 Baughman was able to take the Willamette Chief right up to the foot of the Cascade Rapids on the Columbia River, which were the head of navigation on the lower Columbia. This was over a mile further than any other steamboat had gone up the fast moving stretch of water in the Columbia Gorge. Baughman remained in charge of the William Chief until she was acquired by the Oregon Steam Navigation Company in 1879 and rebuilt. While in her later years as a ferry the Willamette Chief acquired a reputation as slow-moving vessel, when she was first built Willamette Chief was capable of high speed, and once was able to outrace the sidewheeler Oneonta

== Rail ferry service ==
After the Willamette Chief was taken off the wheat trade she was put into the towing business, and after some miscellaneous work, the once-celebrated steamer was assigned ferry duty to move rail cars across the Willamette at Portland. In those days before the rail bridges connected the east and west banks of the river, inclined rail docks were built on each side of the river and rail cars were rolled down them onto matching tracks built on the decks of the steamer.

== Destruction by fire ==
By 1894 Willamette Chief had come to the end of her useful life, and was moored at Albina, Oregon awaiting dismantling. By this time the steamer was owned by the Oregon Railway and Navigation Company which arranged to have its wheat dock located near the coal tipples for its steam locomotives. Moored at the wheat dock, as was often the case, was a ship loading wheat, and across the river from the ship was the Willamette Chief. Somehow a fire ignited at a coal tipple, perhaps caused by inflammable coal dust. The burning tipple ignited the wheat dock. Men on the dock desperately hacked at the ship's moorings to get her free before she could catch fire. Just as the wheat ship came free of the dock, the coal tipple collapsed in flames and fire leapt up into the ship's rigging. Drifting free, the burning ship crashed into Willamette Chief which herself was quickly consumed by the fire.
