= Fairhaven (sternwheeler) =

American sternwheel steamboat

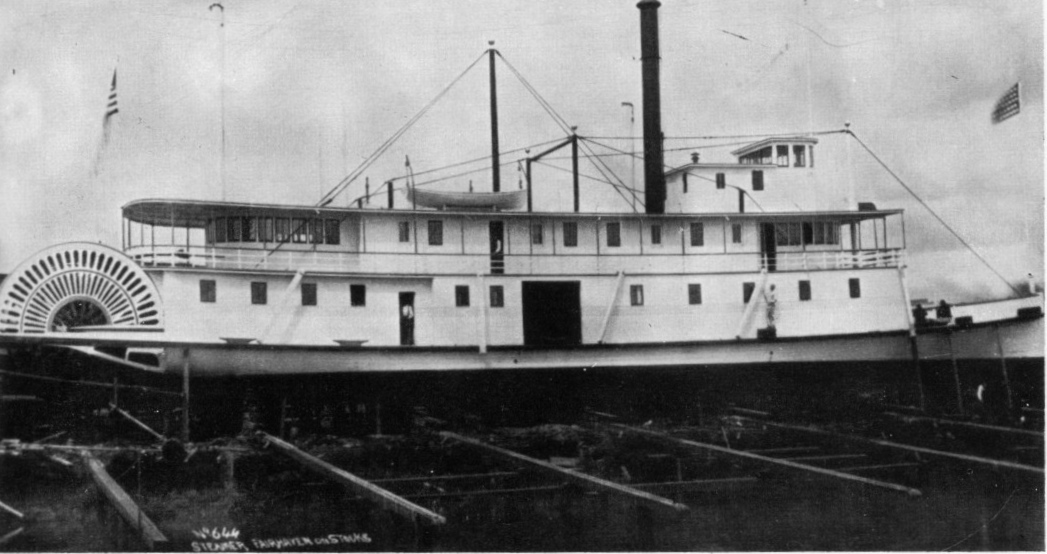
- Fairhaven under construction.

History
- Name: Fairhaven
- Owner: Pacific Nav. Co.; La Conner Trading & Trans. Co.; Puget Sound Nav. Co.
- Route: Puget Sound
- Builder: John J. Holland
- Completed: 1889
- Out of service: 1918
- Identification: US registry 126378
- Fate: Destroyed by fire 1918

General characteristics
- Tonnage: 319.39 gross, 240.57 registered
- Length: 130.2 ft (39.7 m)
- Beam: 26.5 ft (8.1 m)
- Depth: 6.2 ft (1.9 m) depth of hold
- Installed power: twin steam engines, horizontally mounted
- Propulsion: sternwheel

Fairhaven was a sternwheel steamboat of the Puget Sound Mosquito Fleet which operated from 1889 to 1918.

== Career ==
Fairhaven was built in 1889 by John J. Holland for the Pacific Navigation Company in his shipyard at Tacoma, Washington. The vessel was placed on the run from Seattle, to Bellingham, Washington, by way of Whidbey Island and the town of La Conner, Washington.

In March 1907, Fairhaven was blown onto the dock at Coupeville, Washington, during a gale, and then on to the shore, suffering substantial damage. The steamboat Camano towed her off the beach.

On November 3, 1911, Fairhaven sank at her mooring in Seattle. She was raised, but was destroyed by fire in 1918.

== Gallery ==
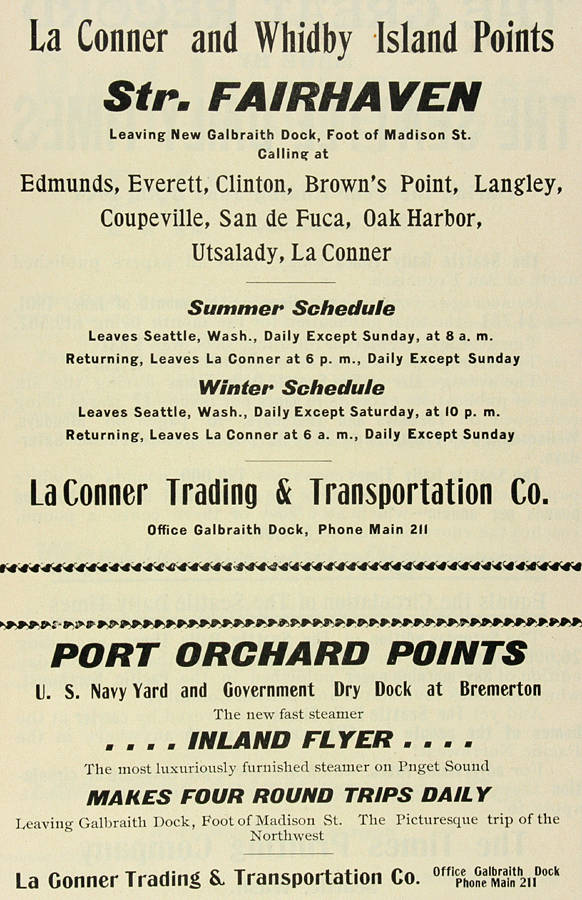
Advertisement for Fairhaven, 1901.

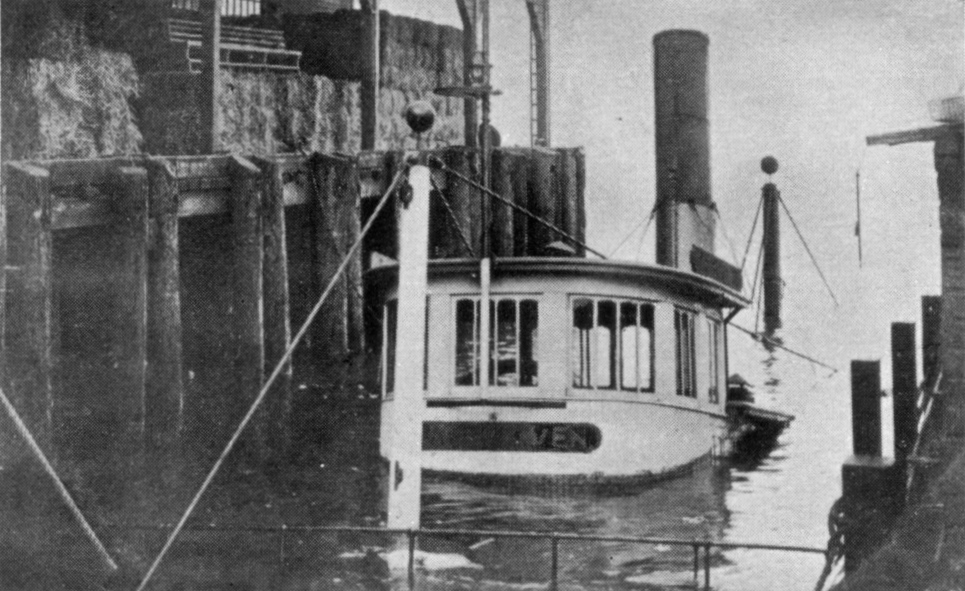
Fairhaven sunk at pier, November 3, 1911.

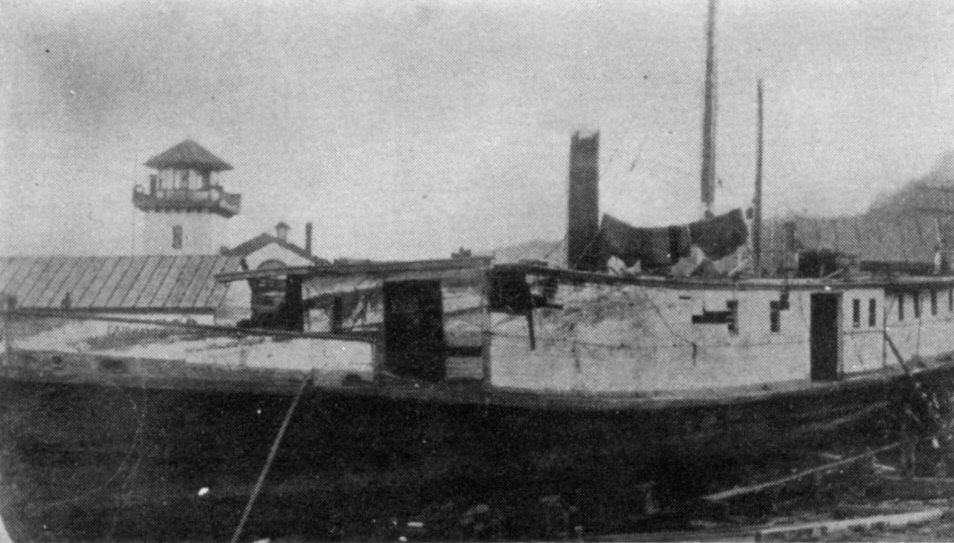
Hulk of Fairhaven, ca.1920, in West Seattle.
