= Alverene =

Launch, built 1912

History
- Name: Alverene
- Owner: Kasch Transportation Co.
- Builder: A.J. Goulette
- Completed: 1912, at Everett, Washington
- Out of service: 1952
- Identification: US registry #209993
- Fate: Deliberately burned at Seattle Seafair celebration

General characteristics
- Type: Motor launch
- Tonnage: 39 gross; 26 registered
- Length: 71.2 ft (21.70 m)
- Beam: 15 ft (4.57 m)
- Depth: 2.6 ft (0.79 m)
- Installed power: as built: gasoline engine, 60 or 75 hp (45 or 56 kW); reengined (1920): 60 hp (45 kW) oil engine
- Capacity: 128 passengers, 6 to 8 tons of freight.

Alverene was a gasoline launch built in 1912 which operated on northern Puget Sound and in the San Juan Islands.

== Design and construction ==
Alverene was built in 1912 in Everett, Washington, by A.J. Goulette. The vessel was 39 gross tons, 26 registered tons in size, 71.2 ft (21.70 m) long, with a 15 ft (4.57 m) beam and powered by a 75 horsepower (56 kW) Buffalo gasoline engine. Another source gives 60 indicated horsepower (45 kW) for the engine in 1915. Different dimensions (60 feet long, 14-foot (4.3 m) beam) in another source.

Alverene was capable of and, at least in 1914, licensed to transport 128 persons, and could easily carry 6 to 8 tons of freight. Alverene was built to replace the launch Ruby Marie on the shipping route from Everett to Oak Harbor, Washington.

== Operations ==
Alverene was first operated under the command of Capt. John H. Prather (b. 1868), a prominent businessman of the Whidbey Island cooperative community of Freeland, Washington. Shortly after Alverene was completed, the vessel was seriously damaged in a docking accident that occurred on August 16, 1912, at Everett. The accident caused by the much larger steel-hulled steamship Sioux. In 1914 Alverene was providing regular service to the community of Greenbank, Washington.

After World War I (1914-1918), Alverene was operated by Capt. William H. Kasch (1872-1926), president of Kasch Transportation Company out of Anacortes, Washington, on routes to points I the San Juan Islands. In 1920, the vessel was repowered with a 60 horsepower (45 kW) Fairbanks-Morse oil engine. Another source describes Alverene as being powered with a semi-diesel engine.

In the mid-1920s, ferries began to be operated on the San Juan routes. These ferries, backed first by Crosby Marine Corporation, and later by the powerful Puget Sound Navigation Company presented a serious challenge to the companies operating small passenger and freight vessels, such as Kasch Transportation, that had been servicing the islands since the early 1900s. Eventually the small companies were driven out of business.

Alverene is reported to have been owned (but not operated) by the Puget Sound Navigation Company from 1931 to 1932.

== Disposition ==
In 1952 Alverene was deliberately burned as part of the Seattle Seafair celebration.
