= State of Washington (sternwheeler) =

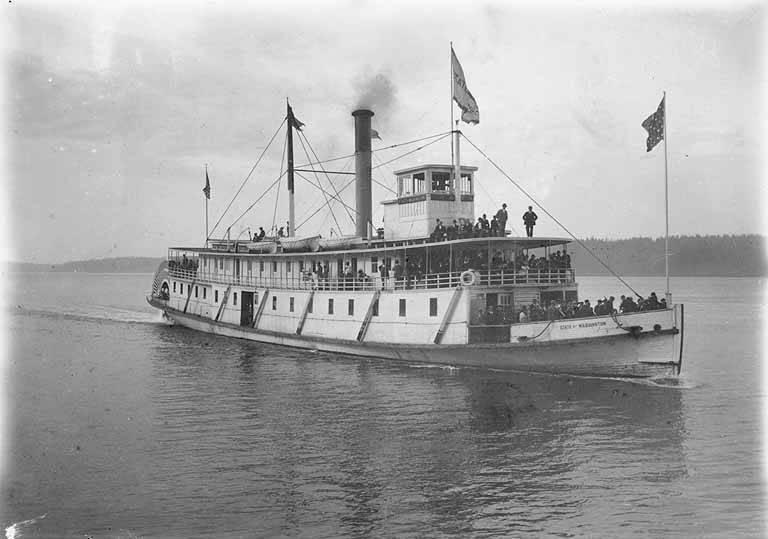
- State of Washington under way.

History
- Name: State of Washington
- Owner: La Conner Trading & Trans. Co.; Shaver Transportation Company
- Route: Puget Sound, Hood Canal, Columbia River
- Builder: John J. Holland
- Completed: 1889, Tacoma, Washington
- Out of service: 1921
- Identification: US registry 115272
- Fate: Destroyed by boiler explosion

General characteristics
- Tonnage: 449 gross tons
- Length: 170.4 ft (51.9 m)
- Beam: 31.3 ft (9.5 m)
- Depth: 7 ft (2.1 m) depth of hold
- Installed power: steam engines, 504 indicated horsepower
- Propulsion: sternwheel

State of Washington was a sternwheel steamboat of the Puget Sound Mosquito Fleet, later transferred to the Columbia River.

== Career ==
State of Washington was built in 1889 by John J. Holland in Tacoma, Washington. From 1889 to 1902 the vessel was placed on the Seattle-Bellingham route. From 1902 to 1907, the vessel was operated as a standby boat on the Tacoma-Seattle run. Later, the vessel was assigned to the Hood Canal route. In 1913, the vessel was transferred to the Columbia River to be operated by the Shaver Transportation Company. In 1915 the vessel was converted to a towboat. In 1921, the vessel was destroyed by a boiler explosion. Six crewmen were injured and one man was killed.
