= R. R. Thompson (sternwheeler) =

1878 steamboat

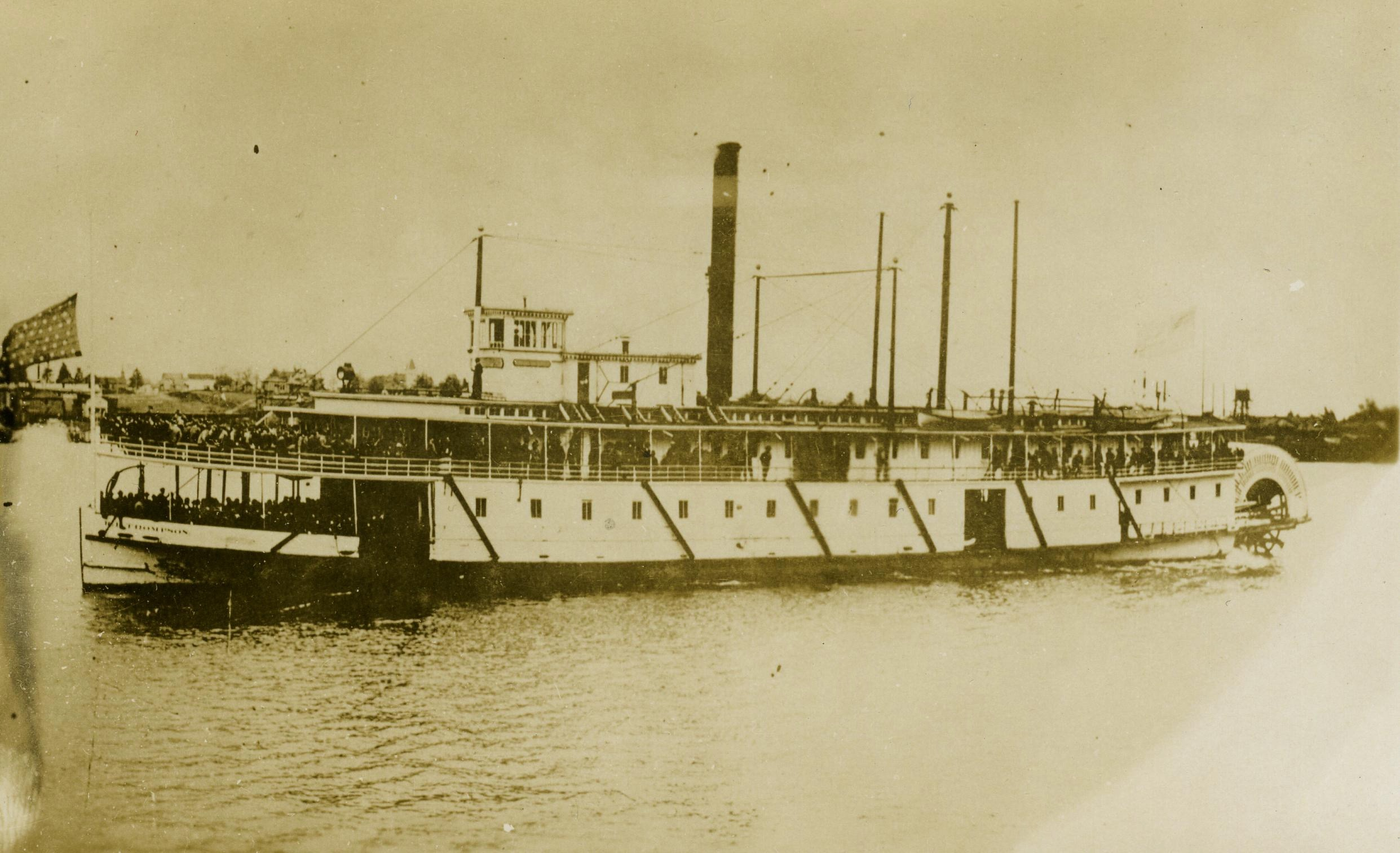
- R.R. Thompson circa 1890

History
- Name: R. R. Thompson
- Owner: Oregon Steam Navigation Company
- Route: Columbia River
- Builder: J. J. Holland, at The Dalles, Oregon
- Launched: June 1878
- Maiden voyage: September 28, 1878
- In service: 1878
- Out of service: 1904
- Fate: Dismantled
- Notes: Ran on middle Columbia 1878-1882, thereafter on lower Columbia, wrecked 1892, raised and repaired

General characteristics
- Displacement: 1158 gross tons 912 net tons
- Length: 212 ft (65 m)
- Beam: 38.0 ft (12 m)
- Depth: 9.5 ft (3 m) depth of hold
- Decks: three (freight, passenger, hurricane)
- Installed power: steam
- Propulsion: twin steam engines, 28" bore by 96" stroke, horizontally mounted
- Speed: 23 miles per hour over extended downstream run
- Notes: Near sistership to Wide West. Reconstructed 1888

R. R. Thompson was a large sternwheel steamboat designed in the classic Columbia River style. She was named after Robert R. Thompson, one of the shareholders of the Oregon Steam Navigation Company, the firm that built the vessel.

== Design and construction ==
R. R. Thompson's passenger deck as built, extended the full length of her hull, this was typical only of the very largest vessels on the Columbia river system, such as Daisy Ainsworth, Bailey Gatzert, and Wide West, the later two being built by Capt. J. J. Holland (1843–1893) as was R. R. Thompson.

She was said to be "capable of making rapid time with a big cargo" with "passenger accommodations unsurpassed by any steamer in the Northwest.":

The Thompson was a big boat for her day. Her two hundred and fifteen foot length and thirty-eight foot beam allowed for spacious passenger accommodations with ample room for freight. Passenger spaces were nicely fitted out and the ladies' cabin boasted carpets, plush settees, and polished panelled walls. The Thompson was not a fast boat. Rather she deliberately was built for comfort and truly qualified for such overblown adjectives as 'palace boat' and 'finest cuisine afloat,' whipped up by enthusiastic passenger agents of the day.

R. R. Thompson was launched on the middle Columbia River, that is, the reach from the top of the Cascades of the Columbia eastward to The Dalles where a second and longer stretch of rapids began. She was said to be "in every respect the equal of the Wide West", another similar but more well-known steamer operating on the lower Columbia and Willamette rivers at the time. Her trial run was on September 28, 1878, under Capt. George Ainsworth and Engineer Peter De Huff. Immediately afterwards she was placed in service running between the Cascades and The Dalles.

== Operations ==
Captain John McNulty was the first master of R. R. Thompson on the middle river run. The vessel was part of a much larger transportation mechanism, designed to use the Columbia River as a highway to reach the mines of Idaho and Eastern Oregon, and the newly established farms and ranchlands of the Inland Empire. R. R. Thompson would operate in conjunction with the Wide West, which would carry the traffic up to the Cascades from Portland and points on the lower river. Once at the Cascades, all passengers would disembark, and all freight would unloaded. There was a short railway alongside the rapids. The passengers would board the portage railway's cars, and roustabouts would load on the cargo, and the train would run along the rapids to the upper Cascades, where passengers would board the R. R. Thompson, the freight would loaded on, then R. R. Thompson would run up the river to The Dalles, where the entire process would be repeated again to surmount Celilo Falls.

== Transfer to the lower river ==
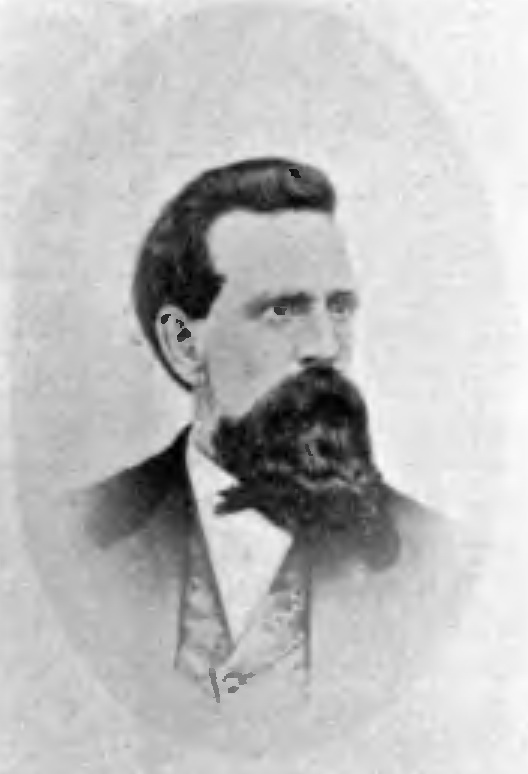
Capt. John McNulty, who took R.R. Thompson through the Cascades of the Columbia

As railroads were extended along the banks of the Columbia River, the days of the steamboat as the dominant means of transportation gradually came to an end, particularly on the middle river, which required expensive and time-consuming portages around the two major rapids at Cascades and above The Dalles.

The first boat to be taken off the river was the R. R. Thompson. On June 3, 1882, Captain John McNulty took R.R. Thompson down through the Cascade Rapids to operate on the more lucrative lower Columbia and lower Willamette rivers.

That day Captain McNulty with William Johnson, first officer, William Doran, engineer, and George Fuller, assistant, took R. R. Thompson out of The Dalles at 6:30 a.m., passed Klickitat Landing, ten miles below, in twenty-four minutes, White Salmon, about twenty-three miles, in fifty-one minutes, Hood River, twenty-five miles, in fifty-eight minutes, and reached the Cascades, forty-six miles, in two hours and one minute.

R. R.Thompson remained at the top of the Cascades a short time and then swung into the stream and entered the Cascades under full stroke, making the run to Bonneville in six minutes and forty seconds, passing through the heart of the rapids at the rate of a mile a minute.

The trip to Portland was accomplished in two hours and fifty minutes, and she steamed past Ash Street dock at 12:17 p.m. Her actual running time was five hours.

The passage of the Thompson through the six-mile long Cascades Rapids in 6 minutes 40 seconds was a record which was approached but never beaten. The most famous later occasion was by Hassalo in her run on May 26, 1888. On that occasion, R. R. Thompson, with Captain McNulty still in command, together with Lurline transported 1,500 people to an equal number of others at the Cascades to witness Hassalo's run.

== Later years ==
In 1892, the boat struck a rock near Mt. Coffin, but was raised and brought to Portland, Oregon for repairs. (Note: Timmen states the wreck was in 1893.) In later years, the Thompson was run as a night boat on the Astoria run and as a relief boat. Operating as a night boat, her passengers would leave Portland after dinner and arrive in Astoria early the next morning. She was laid up for several years before she was dismantled in 1904.

== See also ==
- Wide West
- Lurline
