= Oneonta (sidewheeler) =

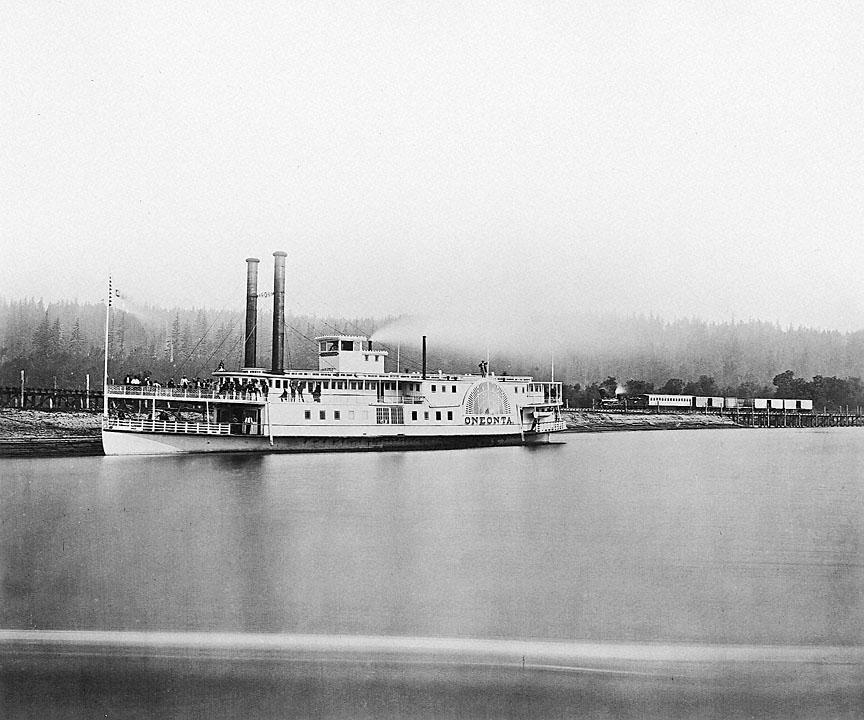
- Oneonta meeting portage train at Upper Cascades, Wash. Terr., 1867

History
- Name: Oneonta
- Owner: Oregon Steam Navigation Company
- Route: Columbia River and lower Willamette River to Portland, Oregon
- Builder: Samuel Forman
- Completed: 1863, Celilo, Oregon
- Out of service: 1877
- Fate: Dismantled or abandoned

General characteristics
- Tonnage: 497-tons
- Length: 150 ft (46 m)
- Installed power: steam
- Propulsion: sidewheels

The Oneonta was a sidewheel steamboat that operated on the Columbia River from 1863 to 1877.

== Design ==
Oneonta was one of the rare examples of a Mississippi-style riverboat built on the Columbia River. Typical of the Mississippi-style were the two funnels forward of the pilot house, with sidewheels instead of sternwheels at the preferred design, and the pilot house itself being located near the middle of the boat.

== Operation ==
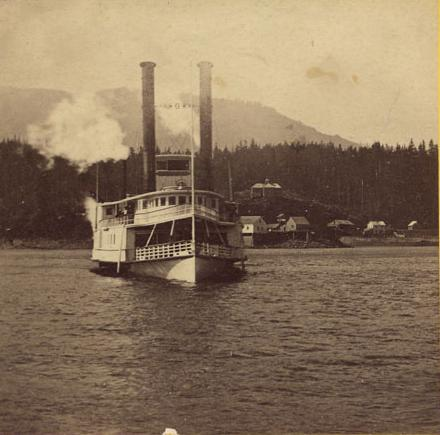
Oneonta near upper Cascades, in 1867

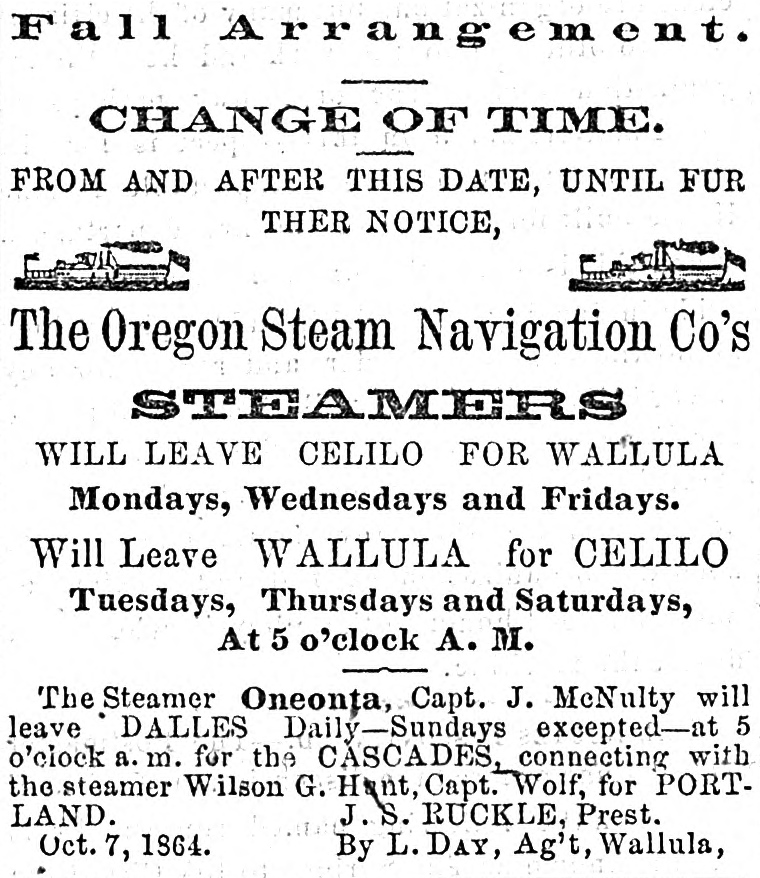
1865 newspaper advertisement for Oneonta running on the middle Columbia

Oneonta ran on the stretch of the Columbia River between the Cascade Rapids eastward to The Dalles, where another longer stretch of whitewater. The rapids east of The Dalles were generally known as Celilo Falls. There were portages around both sets of rapids. Originally these were just tracks, but they were gradually replaced by railways, first drawn by mules and then by steam engines. Oregon Steam Navigation Company built Oneonta in an effort to control both the portages and the middle river route connecting them as the only feasible transport line to the gold rushes that were going on in Eastern Oregon and Idaho in the 1860s. When this business tampered off, in 1870, the president of O.S.N., John C. Ainsworth took Oneonta down through the Cascade Rapids at high water to run on the lower Columbia.

== Disposition ==
Oneonta was taken out of service in 1877 and served as barge until being abandoned in 1880.
