= Telegraph (1903 sternwheeler) =

American steamboat

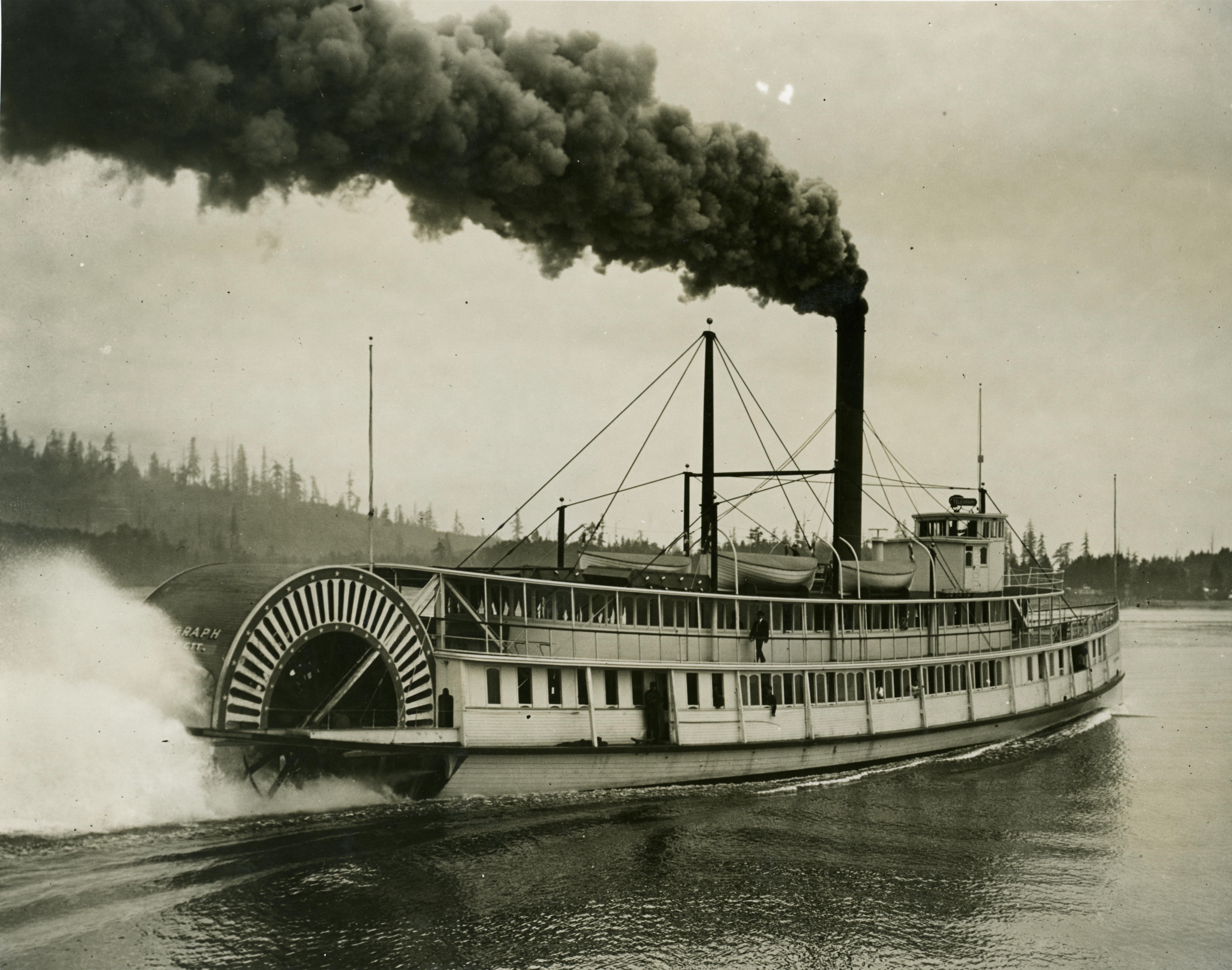
- Steamer Telegraph

History
- Name: Telegraph, later Olympian, then Logger
- Route: Puget Sound, Columbia River
- In service: 1903
- Identification: U.S. 200012; as Logger, U.S. 224389
- Fate: Reconstructed 1924; dismantled 1940
- Notes: Known as Olympian after 1912, and Logger after 1924

General characteristics
- Type: Inland steamship
- Tonnage: 386 GRT, 243 NRT
- Length: 153.7 ft (46.8 m) measured over the hull
- Beam: 25.7 ft (7.8 m)
- Depth: 8 ft (2 m) depth of hold
- Decks: Three (freight, passenger, boat)
- Installed power: Twin horizontally mounted single-cylinder steam engines; two-cylinder compound steam engines after 1912
- Propulsion: Stern-wheel
- Speed: Maximum approx. 20 miles per hour
- Capacity: 400 passengers and 150 tons of freight
- Crew: 11

Telegraph was a sternwheel-driven steamboat built in 1903 in Everett, Washington. Except for the summer of 1905, from 1903 to 1912, Telegraph served in Puget Sound, running mainly on the route from Seattle to Everett, and also from Seattle to Tacoma and Olympia, Washington.

During the summer of 1905, Telegraph was transferred to Portland, Oregon to carry visitors arriving for the Lewis and Clark Exposition. Telegraph was nearly destroyed in 1912 when the large iron-hulled ocean-going steamer collided with Colman Dock, cutting completely through the dock from the south side, and then crushing Telegraph which had been tied up on the north side of the dock.

Telegraph was raised, rebuilt, and renamed Olympian. In 1916, Olympian was transferred to Portland, where it ran from Portland on several routes, including to The Dalles and Astoria, Oregon. Olympian was a popular excursion vessel for a number of years. Olympian served as a salvage support vessel in 1922. Olympian was dismantled in 1924, and the cabin structure and equipment was installed onto a newly built hull, and the new boat, named Logger, was used in towing work. Logger itself sank at its moorings in 1940 and was dismantled.

== Construction ==
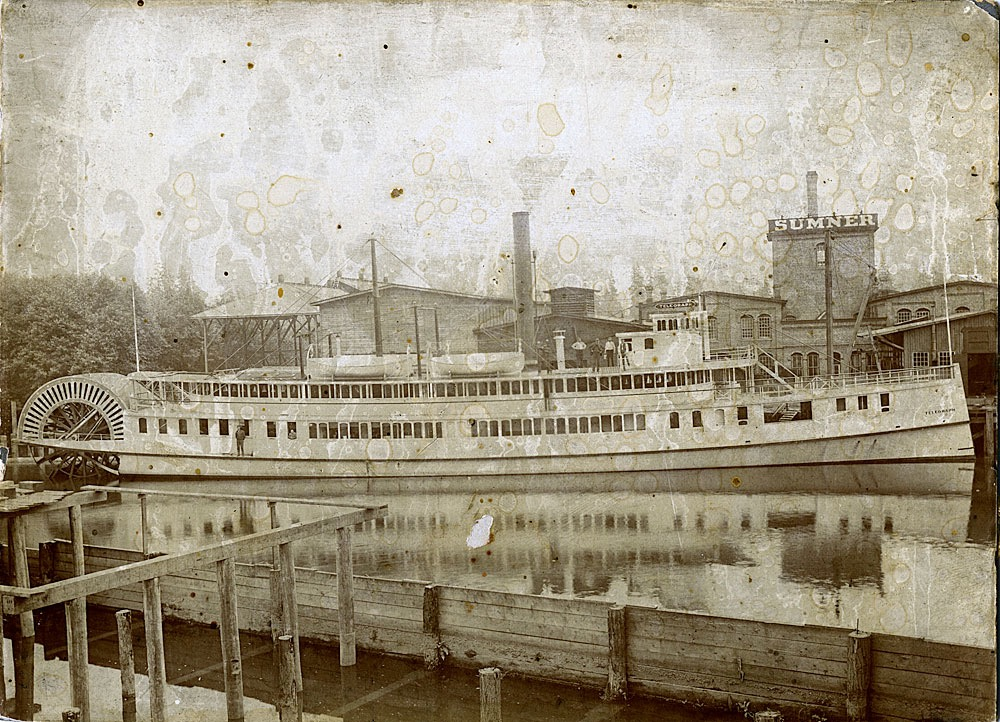
Telegraph fitting out at Sumner Iron Works

Telegraph was built at Everett, Washington. Telegraph was designed by Captain Uriah Bonser "U.B." Scott. Telegraph was built for Captain Scott in Everett by the Portland Shipbuilding Company, and placed in service on the Everett-Seattle route, running on an alternate schedule with the propeller-driven City of Everett, to replace Greyhound on the route. Master engineer Charles Lake (1868-1950) assisted U.B. Scott in the construction of the steamer.

=== Dimensions ===
Telegraph was 153.7 ft (46.8 m) long, measured over the hull exclusive of the extension over the stern, called the fantail, on which the stern-wheel was mounted. Telegraph had a beam of 25.7 ft (7.8 m), and depth of hold of 8 ft (2.4 m). Overall size of the steamer was 386 gross tons and 243 net tons, with tons being a measure of volume and not weight. Telegraph had an observation cabin that was 110 feet long. The steamer could carry 400 passengers and 150 tons of freight. Telegraph's crew numbered 11.

=== Engineering ===
Telegraph was driven by a stern-wheel, which was turned by a steam engine which generated 750 indicated horsepower. The official registry number was 200012. Telegraph was reported to have been capable of reaching speeds of 20 miles per hour, and was said to have been the fastest steamer on Puget Sound in 1904. In 1914, Telegraph, then renamed Olympian was advertised as having a speed of from 16 to 18 miles per hour.

== Career as Telegraph ==
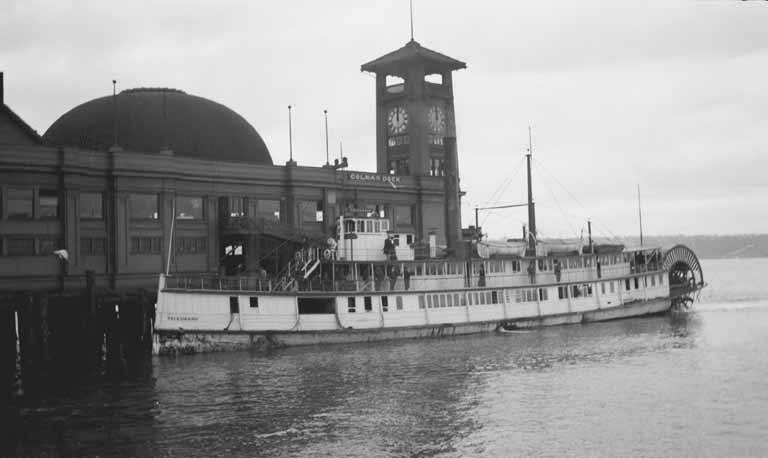
Telegraph at Colman Dock, circa 1911

On August 16, 1903, it was reported that Telegraph was to race Flyer that afternoon, with Telegraph waiting off Duwamish Head for Flyer to come up on its regular 2:45 p.m. trip. When the steamers moved out of sight around Alki Point, Telegraph was ahead by about a quarter-mile. In June 1904, Telegraph was commanded by popular captain Gil Parker

=== Shooting on board ===
On June 6, 1904, at Colman Dock Gertrude Robb shot George Joye four times, and he was reported to have been likely to die as a result. Joye was the porter on the Telegraph. The shooting was reported to have been occasioned by Robb's daughter Camelia (or Camille) Coleman having stated to her mother that she "had been wronged" by Joye.

Robb was reported to have gone the dock, armed with a .32 caliber revolver, and waited for Telegraph to arrive. After the passengers had disembarked, Robb called out to Joye, then from a few feet away, fired five shots, one missed, but the other four struck Joye, with one severing his spinal cord. Robb expressed no regrets and willingly surrendered to a police officer and handed over her pistol.

Robb was taken to jail and Joye was taken to Wayside Mission hospital, where following an operation, doctors described him as having only a very slight chance of recovery. Robb, whose maiden name was Colman, ran a lodging house in Seattle on Washington Street, near Second Avenue south. Her husband was a fireman on the Telegraph. Joye died on July 20, 1904. Gertrude Robb was charged with his murder, but was acquitted by a jury on November 23, 1904.

=== Route changes ===
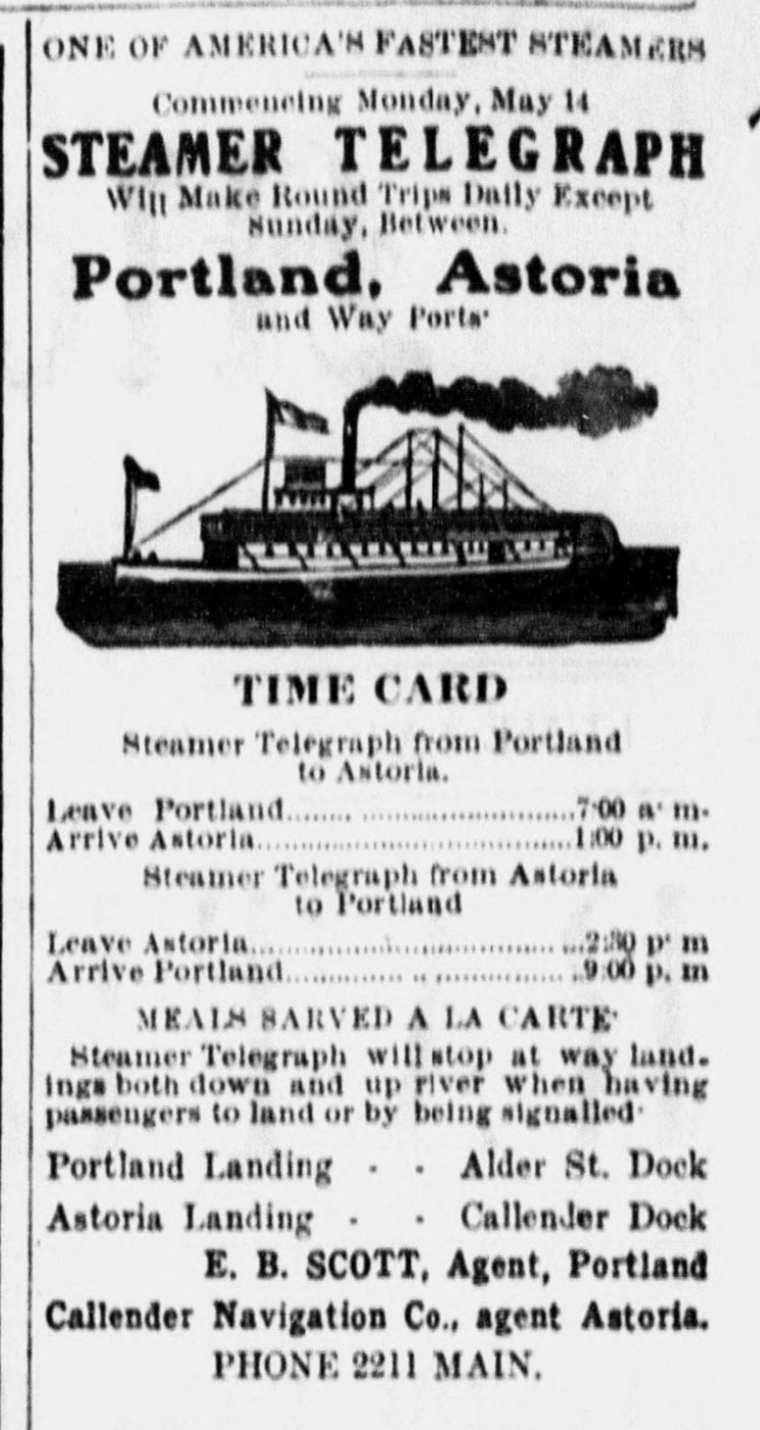
Advertisement for Telegraph service on Portland-Astoria route

In February 1905, Telegraph was owned by the Seattle, Everett and Tacoma Transportation Company, and was running between Seattle and Everett, alternating with the steamer City of Everett. In April 1905, Captain Scott announced that he would put Telegraph on the day run between Seattle and Bellingham in the summer. In 1905, Telegraph was transferred temporarily from Seattle to Portland, Oregon to handle increased passenger traffic arising from the Lewis and Clark Centennial Exposition.

In May 1906, Telegraph was advertised as making a daily run from Portland to Astoria, Oregon, at way landings up and down river if there were passengers to land, or if signaled. Telegraph was to depart from Portland at 7:00 a.m. and arriving at Astoria at 1:00 p.m. Returning, Telegraph was to depart Astoria at 2:30 p.m. and arriving at Portland at 9:00 p.m. The Portland landing was the Alder Street Dock, and the Astoria Landing was the Callendar dock. Meals were advertised to be "sarved [sic] a la carte." E.B. Scott was the Portland agent, and Callendar Navigation Co. was the Astoria agent.

In January 1910, Telegraph made three round trips daily from Seattle to Everett, and one round trip on Sunday. Telegraph departed from the Colman Dock in Seattle, and from the City Dock in Everett.

=== Ownership changes ===
In 1910 Telegraph was owned by the Seattle-Everett Navigation Company, which was a subsidiary of the Columbia River and Puget Sound Navigation Company, of which the well-known Captain U.B. Scott was in charge. In that year, the Puget Sound Navigation Company bought both Telegraph and City of Everett from Seattle-Everett Nav. Co., along with other assets of the company. The Seattle-Bremerton route had been the last one served by Telegraph for Captain Scott's companies.

=== Sunk at Colman Dock ===
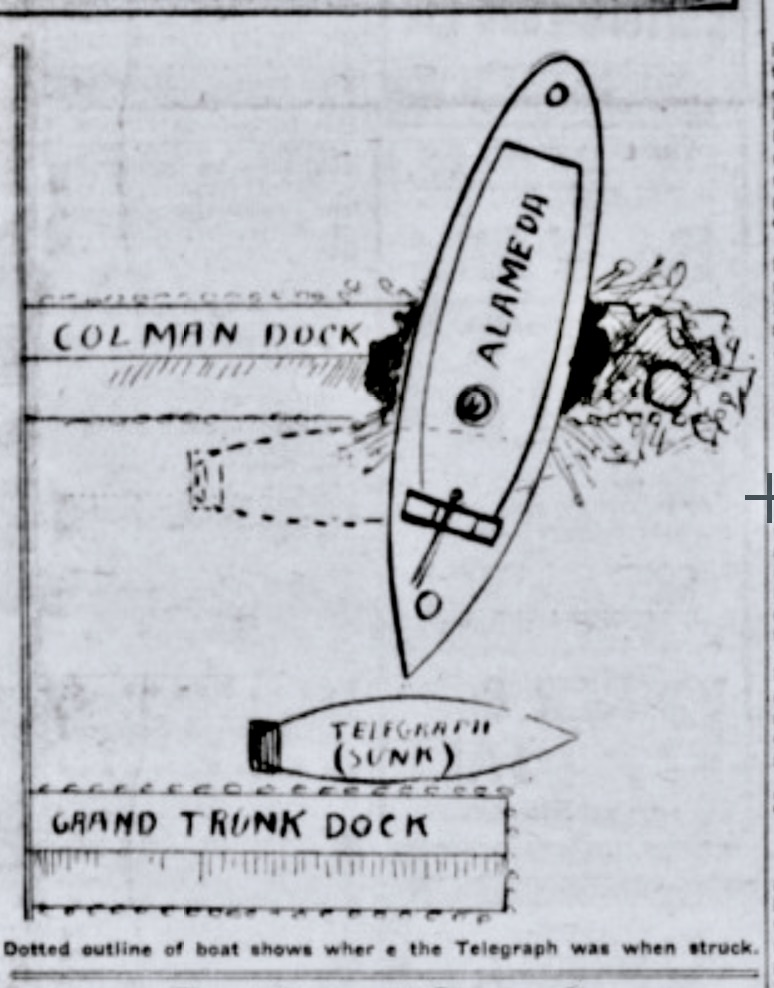
Diagram of collision at Colman Dock which sunk Telegraph.

On the night of April 25, 1912, Telegraph was berthed at Colman Dock in Seattle, when the heavy iron steamship Alameda collided with Telegraph, nearly cutting the sternwheeler in two. Alameda then crashed into the dock, knocking its famous clocktower into the water. The famous captain John A. "Dynamite Johnny" O'Brien, as pilot, was in charge of Alameda at the time. O'Brien was maneuvering Alameda into a berth, and in so doing gave the signal "full astern" to the engine room, which for some reason was picked up as "full ahead."

== Career as Olympian ==
In 1913, Telegraph was renamed Olympian. Olympian was an oil-burner. The single-cylinder steam engines that had been installed on Telegraph were replaced with compound tandem steam engines. Each engine generated 750 horsepower and had two cylinders, one for high pressure steam, and another using low pressure steam after it had passed through the high pressure cylinder. The high pressure cylinder had a bore of 15 inches. The bore was 28 inches for the low pressure cylinder. Each engine had piston stroke of 72 inches.

In June 1914, Olympian, then lying at the King Street dock in Seattle, was listed as for sale by J.B. Mitchell. On June 26, 1914, it was reported that a new concern, Red Ball Steamship Company, had placed Olympian on route which included Edmonds, Everett, Seattle, Tacoma, Bremerton, and Olympia, Washington. The new company cut rates on the Seattle-Tacoma run from 35 to 25 cents, on the Seattle-Olympia run from $1.10 to 75 cents, and on the Tacoma-Olympia run from 75 to 50 cents.

On July 2, 1914, it was reported that the owners of Olympian would be arrested on charges of violating the public service law of the State of Washington as soon as members of the public commission could gather evidence and swear out warrants in King County, Washington. The steamer had been running on the west side of Vashon Island on the Seattle-Tacoma route. The complaint was brought by other steamboat companies, and charged Olympian's owners had not received permission from the commission to run a recent Sunday excursion to Olympia at a low rate, and had not filed the required tariffs with the commission.

On July 16, 1914, the Independent Navigation Company advertised a "grand excursion" from Seattle to Olympia, to take place the next Sunday, July 19. The steamer would depart Seattle from Pier 4, at the foot of Spring Street, at 9:30 a.m., and return from Olympia at 10:15 p.m. Round trip tickets cost one dollar.

Operations under the Red Ball company did not last long, as by November 1914, Olympian was back on this market, this time being advertised as "FOR SALE CHEAP" by an admiralty lawyer, Moncrieffe Cameron, possibly meaning the vessel had been seized for debts.

=== Transfer to the Columbia River ===
Olympian proved not to be a success on the Seattle-Tacoma-Olympia route, and so was transferred to the Columbia river. On September 28, 1916, Olympian departed Port Townsend, Washington.

In September 1916, Olympian was sold to a group of Portland capitalists headed by J.M. Ayres for service on the Columbia River, departing Seattle on September 28. John M. Ayres was a timber broker with an office in the Henry Building in Portland. He was said to have been some connection to the steamer.

Coming over the Columbia Bar, a wave struck Olympian and broke all of its hogchains, but was still brought into Astoria safely.

Olympian had been purchased by John C. Ayres, who had been for several years before in charge of the Hammond Lumber Company's seagoing raftings of piling at Stella, Washington. Veteran steamboat captain Sid Scammon (1875-1931), who had resigned from the Regulator Line a few days previously, was to be put into command of Olympian.

Olympian left Astoria at 10:00 a.m. on September 30, 1916 for Portland, Oregon, where it was planned to put the steamer in drydock to repair the damage from having been hogged coming over the Columbia river bar.

=== Idled in Portland ===
The new owners, J.M. Ayres and S.H. Scammon, had not yet announced when Olympian would be put into service, nor on which route they would put it. . According to another report, the owners planned to put the steamer on the run from Portland to The Dalles, Oregon.

As of May 1917, Olympian had been laying for some months downriver from the Broadway Bridge in Portland. In May 1917 it was reported that Olympian was soon to be placed on Portland-Astoria run.

Olympian was to make daily trips on the route, departing from Callender's dock in Astoria at 7:00 a.m. for Portland, and from Oak Street dock in Portland at 4:00 p.m. for the return to Astoria. Olympian would join the steamers Georgiana, Undine, and Harvest Queen on the route, and would charge the same $1 fare as Georgiana.

=== Placed on the Astoria run ===
Olympian made the first trip on the new route on Wednesday, May 23, 1917, departing Astoria in the morning and reaching Portland at 4:00 p.m., with Capt. Sid Scammon in command and Captain Fritz Krause as pilot Olympian departed Portland before 5:00 p.m. that day to return to Astoria.

=== Laid up in Portland ===
In November 1917 the Portland Port Commission was considering acquiring a stern-wheel towboat. Olympian, then lying idle in Portland on the east side of the Willamette river below the Broadway Bridge, was offered to the commission, but the commission thought Olympian was not the class of vessel that was wanted.

Kelso Transportation Company, headed by A.E. Hayes, purchased Olympian in the fall of 1919. Kelso Transportation Co. also owned the sternwheeler Metlako. Olympian was still out of service in early November 1919, when the steamer was towed to the foot of Taylor street, in Portland, to be overhaulled. There was talk that Olympian might be converted to a grain carrier. On January 15, 1920, Olympian, still lying at Taylor Street, was scheduled for an inspection by the Steamboat Inspection Service.

=== Portland - The Dalles run ===
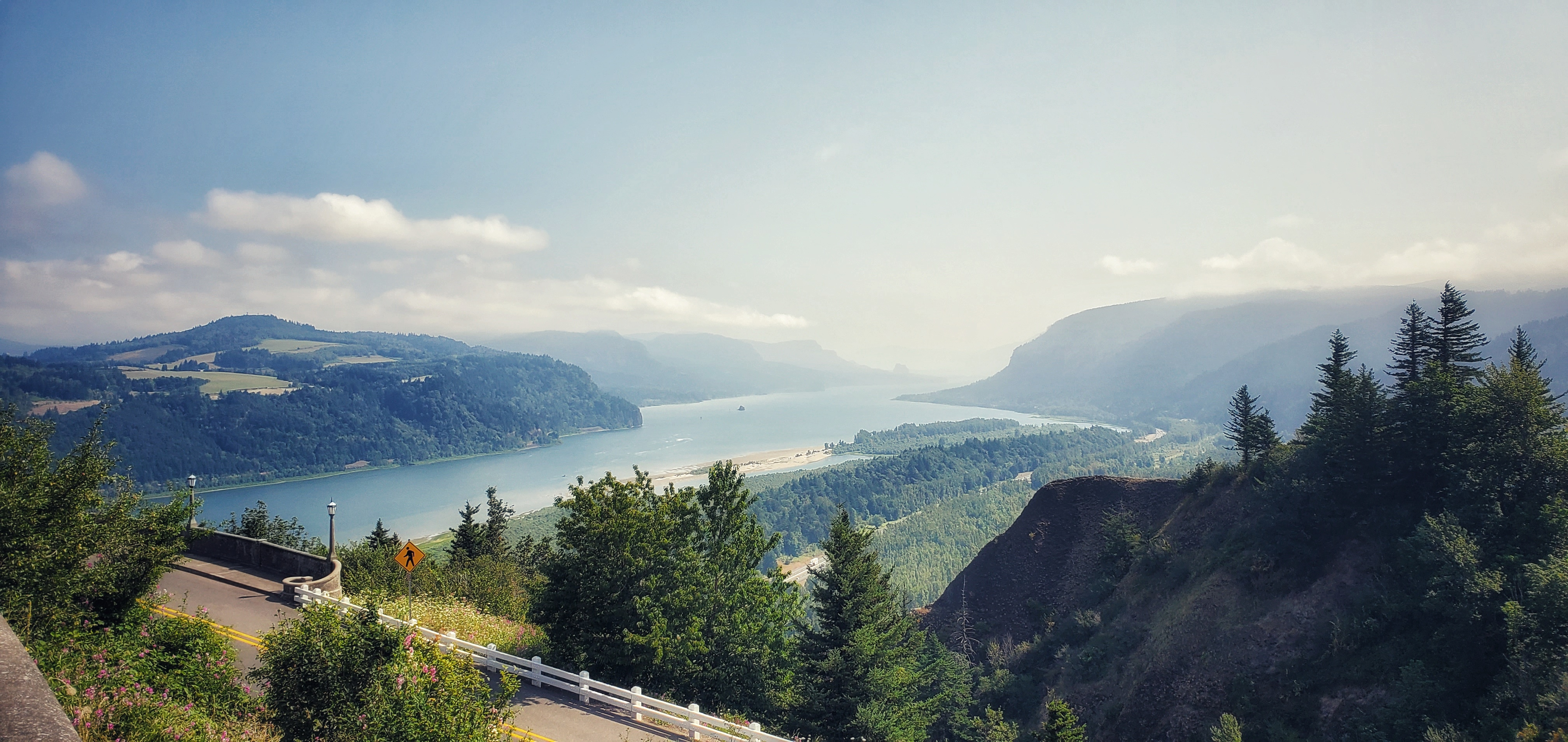
The Columbia River Gorge, as it appears today, was the destination of excursions on Olympian.

On February 10, 1920, it was reported that Northwestern Transportation Co. would, starting March 1, put the newly renovated Olympian on a regular run between Portland and The Dalles, Oregon. From March 2 until the tourist season, Olympian would make the trip in two days. In the summer tourist season, Olympian would carry passengers and fast freight on a daily run to The Dalles. The company hoped to revive the days when Telephone, Bailey Gatzert, and Charles R. Spencer used to carry thousands of visitors to the scenic Columbia Gorge. On Sundays the boat would run to the Cascades Locks only.

Olympian would comfortably seat 300 people. Master of Olympian would be Capt. Fritz Kruse, with Herman Fries as pilot. Pullman-style arranged around the walls of the lounge would allow 120 to look out the windows at the scenery, and there were seats on the deck for 100 more people.

In a letter to the St. Helens Mist, in March 1920, Frank Shepard, who had an ownership interest in Olympian and J.N. Teal, stated that his company would run buses in conjunction with the Olympian's river run to The Dalles, so that passengers could ride up on the steamer and return to Portland by bus, and vice versa. Shepard was the principal of Shepard's Auto Bus Company, of Portland.

As of April 1920, Olympian was owned by the Northwestern Transportation Company. At that time the river was too low to allow the deep draft Olympian to reach The Dalles, and the vessel was not capable of handling heavy freight.

Captain John Zumwalt took command of Olympian in June 1920. In July 1920, Olympian was employed in the excursion business. On a scenic trip on July 4 to the Cascades Rapids, Olympian carried over 300 people. Every Sunday in July 1920, Olympian left the Taylor Street dock in Portland at 9:00 a.m. for the Cascades, returning to Portland at 6:00 p.m. The trip was advertised to have "over a hundred mile panorama of mountain crags and waterfalls." The fare was $2.

== Later years ==
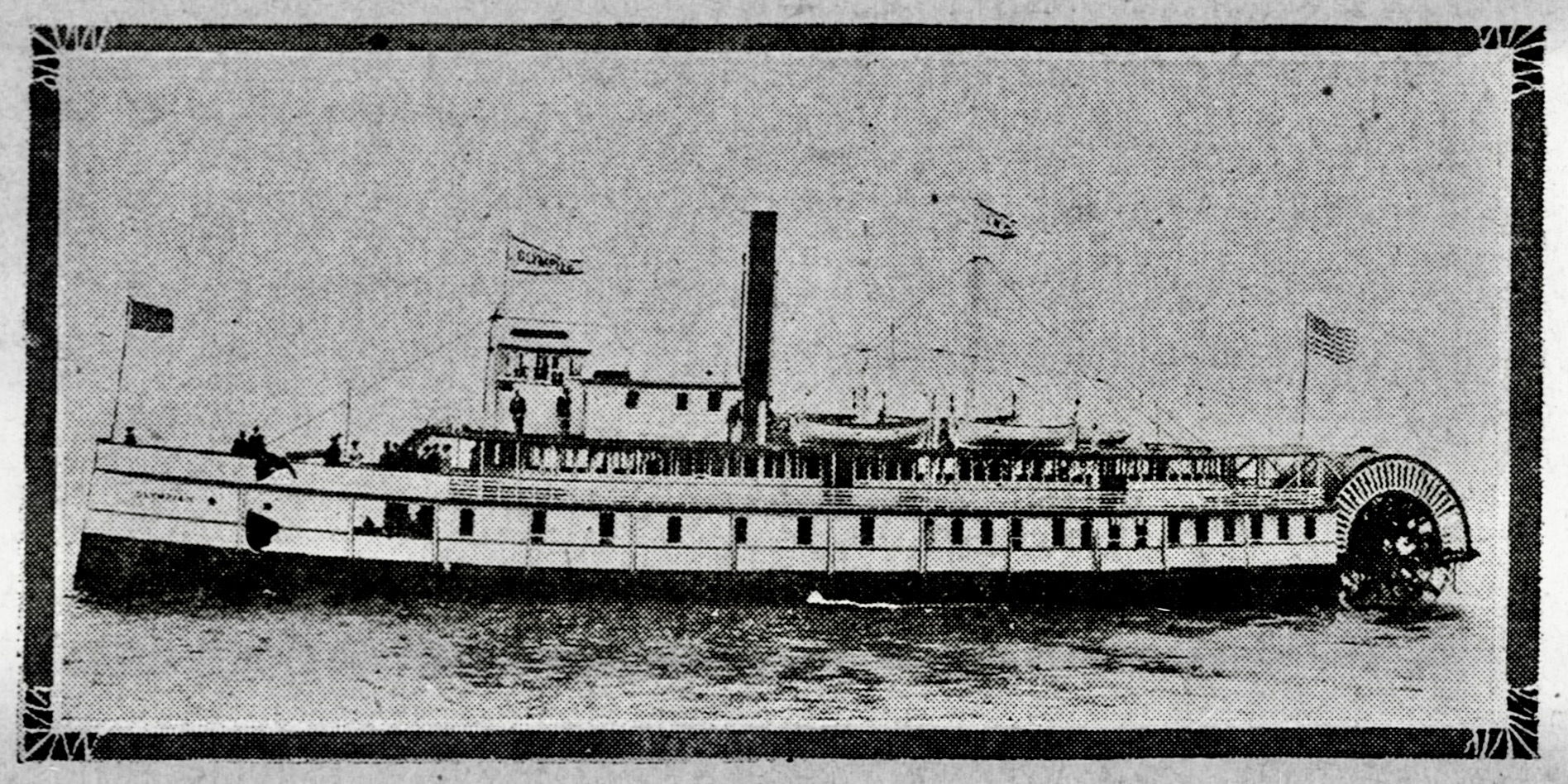
Olympian in 1920, from a newspaper photograph.

Demand for steamer service to The Dalles fell off rapidly in the early 1920s. After the summer excursion season of 1920, Olympian was laid up for several months. On January 3, 1921, Olympian was prepared to take the place of J.N. Teal on the Portland—The Dalles route, under veteran captain Arthur H. Riggs (1870-1941), with the trip to be made twice weekly. Riggs had commanded Olympian in 1905, when under the name Telegraph the steamer had carried passengers during the Lewis and Clark Exposition. Olympian was considered to have an advantage over J.N. Teal because of having a smaller crew and being able to purchase oil fuel at a price of 70 cents less per barrel.

Olympian was out-dated on the Portland-The Dalles route. Trucks on the newly opened Columbia River Highway cut into the steamer's freight business. An experiment was tried by taking on fully loaded motor trucks on to the steamer's freight deck, carrying them upriver, and then driving them off the boat and then to the destination.

The roll on - roll off experiments produced no profit, and for a time in 1921, Olympian was placed on the Portland-Astoria route, running briefly against the fast propeller steamer Georgiana. Late in 1921, Olympian was withdrawn from service and laid up at Fulton.

=== Sale to Smith Transportation ===
In January 1922, Olympian, then lying at the foot of Virginia Street in Portland, was listed for sale by my T.H Adams, deputy liquidation supervisor of the Kelso State Bank. The sale was to be conducted by sealed bid, due by February 13, 1922. All bids were subject to the approval of the superior court of the State of Washington for Cowlitz County, Washington.

This sale was possibly related to Kelso State Bank's having been taken in charge the previous year by the banking commissioner for the State of Washington, Claude Hay. It had been reported that on March 17, 1921, at about 9:45 p.m., F.L. Stewart, either jumped or fell off the launch Queen, while Queen was en route across the Columbia from Goble, Oregon to Kalama, Washington. Stewart had held an ownership interest in the Northwest Transportation company, which operated Olympian on the Columbia River.

On March 30, 1922, Milton Smith( 1874-1951), of Rainier, Oregon purchased Olympian for use in his fleet of logging towboats. By then Olympian had been moored at a place called Fulton for some time. Other steamers in the fleet of the Smith Transportation Company at the time were the sternwheelers Nestor, Cowlitz, and Service.

=== Salvage vessel ===
On May 28, 1922, the British Furnace-Prince freighter Welsh Prince had been wrecked in the Columbia River near Altoona, Washington as a result of a collision in dense fog with the American-Hawaiian freighter Iowa. Seven sailors on Welsh Prince were killed. Salvage operations conducted by M. Barde and Sons, who leased Olympian from Milton Smith, for towing barges, housing men working at the scene, and providing power. Captain Robert F. Caples was in command of Olympian.

== Conversion to towing vessel Logger ==
Logger, on right, distinctive for having two chimneys. Henderson, on left, with a single chimney, showing more common engineering layout, both at the dock of Shaver Transportation Company, in Portland, Oregon, in 1940.

By 1923, there was no further demand for regular passenger or freight service by stern-wheelers, and the last regular service to The Dalles came to an end.

In 1924 or 1925, Milton Smith stripped the cabin structure and equipment off Olympian, and installed them on a newly built wooden hull that was 156 ft (47.5 m) long. The new vessel, named Logger was built exclusively to tow log rafts. The reconstruction was done at St. Helens, Oregon.

Logger was 155.7 ft (47.5 m) long measured over the hull, with a beam of 35 ft (10.7 m) and depth of hold of 6.6 ft (2.0 m). The overall size of Logger was 447 gross tons and 322 registered tons, with "ton" being a measure of volume and not weight. Logger was unusual for having two smokestacks, which were called "chimneys." Logger had a crew of 9 and was licensed as a tow boat. The official merchant vessel registry number was 224289.

Logger was unique among Columbia River steamers in that it was the only one built that ran off "hog fuel": chipped sawmill waste. It was dusty, splintery, and difficult to handle, but it was inexpensive.

== Disposition ==
In 1930, Shaver Transportation Company merged with Smith Transportation Co., and so acquired Logger and several other boats. Shaver found Logger to be difficult to operate. Logger sank at the Shaver moorings in Portland and was not returned to service. In 1940, motivated by the high price of scrap metal, and the great success of the new diesel towboats, Shaver had Logger dismantled.Logger's name board was recovered, and later displayed with those of many other steamers, at Champoeg State Park along the Willamette River.
