= Nestor (sternwheeler) =

History
- Name: Nestor
- Owner: Columbia & Cowlitz Transportation Company
- Route: Columbia River and lower Willamette River to Portland, Oregon
- Builder: C.P. Stayton
- Completed: 1902
- Fate: Abandoned, 1929

General characteristics
- Class & type: riverine towboat
- Length: As built 82.4 ft (25.1 m) over hull (exclusive of fantail)
- Beam: 19.6 ft 9 in (6.2 m) over hull (exclusive of guards)
- Depth: 5 ft 0 in (1.52 m)
- Decks: three (main, boiler, and hurricane)
- Installed power: twin steam engines, horizontally mounted, 150 indicated horsepower
- Propulsion: stern-wheel

Nestor was a stern-wheel driven steamboat that operated on the Cowlitz and Columbia rivers from 1902 to 1929. Nestor was primarily operated as a towboat, and did most of the towing work on the Cowlitz River. During the 1920s Nestor was part of a small fleet of towboats operated out of Rainier, Oregon by Capt. Milton Smith.

== Construction ==
Nestor was built at Catlin, Washington, (now west Kelso) in 1902 by Capt. C.P. Stayton (1846–1932), and named after his son, Nestor W. Stayton (1878–1957), who himself later became a steamboat captain and Columbia river pilot.

== Initial ownership ==
C.P. Stayton had been a Methodist minister, who originally arrived in the Pacific Northwest in 1873, where he served as a missionary in Yakima, Washington until 1889, when he came to Catlin, which is now west Kelso, Washington. At Kelso, Stayton built the first Methodist church, and then entered the steamboat business, building Nestor and holding an ownership interest in the Kelso-Catlin ferry, which crossed the Cowlitz river before it was bridged.

== Dimensions ==
Nestor was 82.4 feet long exclusive of the extension over the stern, called the “fantail” on which the stern-wheel was mounted. Nestor had a beam (width) of 19.6 feet, exclusive of the guards, which were long heavy protective timbers running along the outside of the top of the hull on both sides. Depth of hold was 5.0 feet. The overall size of the vessel was 133 gross and 78 registered tons. The twin-horizontally mounted single-cylinder steam engines generated 150 indicated horsepower. The number of crew required was listed as five. The official merchant vessel registry number was 130998.

Nestor was originally owned by the Columbia & Cowlitz River Transportation Company. For many years it was worked as a towboat on the Cowlitz River. Later, under Captain Milton Smith, Nestor engaged in towing work on the Columbia River.

In late 1903 Nestor was rebuilt at Rainier, Oregon, reducing the vessels overall size from 133 to 97 gross tons. The purpose was to lower the required number of crew, with craft of less than 100 tons having to carry much fewer crew than craft over 100 tons. The reduction consisted of reducing the size of the cabin structure, called the “house” and leaving the lower, or “freight” deck, open on the sides.

== Operations ==
Stern-wheel steamers Service (center), Cowlitz (center), and Nestor (right), tied up at a dock, probably at Rainier, Oregon, some time between 1917 and 1929.

Nestor handled most of the towing business on the Cowlitz river from 1902 to the 1920s. The company added the shallow-draft sternwheeler Cowlitz in 1917. Milton Smith moved the company's headquarters from Kelso to Rainier, Oregon.

=== Offer for sale to port commission ===
In November 1913 Nestor was offered for sale to the Port of Portland commission for the price of $9,000.00. However the port decided to buy the sternwheeler Pronto for the same price, Pronto having served under lease as a dredge tender for several months.

=== Crewman drowned dogging logs ===
On February 28, 1914, Jack Pferdner, captain of the steamer Agnes, was serving on Nestor while Agnes was temporarily out of service. Nestor was towing logs. Near Prescott about 3 miles upriver from Rainier, some logs broke loose. Pferdner walked out on the log tow to secure the loose logs. This was called “dogging”. The log Pferdner was walking on rolled, and he was thrown head-first into the river. Pferdner came up and tried to grab on to the log, but it kept rolling, and he could not get a grip. Capt James Peck, in charge of Nestor, yelled at Pferdner to get to the end of the log, but by this time, Pferdner was too exhausted to comply. He let go of the log and sank under the water, and was not seen again. Grappling hooks were used to search, all afternoon, for Pferdner's body, but the only thing that was found was the hatchet that Pferdner had been holding when he was thrown into the water.

=== Loss of chief engineer ===
On October 4, 1915, Nestor’s chief engineer, Sebastian Hartman, then 55 years old, dropped dead in the U.S. Customs House in Portland. Hartman had just exited the elevator on the second floor, on his way to visit a steamboat inspector.

=== Fatal electric wire accident ===
On Tuesday, January 8, 1918, Nestor was towing a pile driver on the Cowlitz River when a serious accident occurred. Nestor was on the way upstream, with the driver to be used to replace dolphins and pilings at lumber camps.

As the steamer and tow passed under a power line north of the Cowlitz County bridge, the pile driver, 75 feet high, snagged on a live electric wire strung across the channel at a point about 15 down from the top of the driver. One man was killed and two others were severely burned.

Two days later, A.E. Hayes filed a formal complaint with Colonel Zinn, of the Corps of Engineers, requesting that the height of the wires be investigated. Hayes also alleged that he had been told by a representative of the North Coast Power Company that the current was to have been cut off when the tow passed.

== Ownership shift ==
In early March 1919, Captain Milton Smith, of Rainier, Oregon, took over the Collins and Ostrander shares of the Columbia & Cowlitz River Transportation Company.

== Near destruction by fire ==
Steamer Nestor, upper works destroyed by fire, with steamer Service in background alongside.

On November 7, 1920, Nestor, while moored at Rainier, Nestor caught fire and was nearly destroyed. Nestor had been tied up to the dock owned by Capt. Milton Smith. The fire was not discovered until 4:00 a.m., and when it was, Nestor was set adrift to keep the blaze from spreading to two other vessels at the same dock. The fire was eventually extinguished and the Nestor was beached. The hull was not damaged, and Nestor was rebuilt and placed back in service on April 10, 1921.

By March 1922, the Milton Smith flotilla consisted of Nestor, Cowlitz, Service (ex-Inland Empire, built in 1908), and Olympian (ex-Telegraph), built in 1903 and once one of the fastest steamers on Puget Sound.

== Abandonment ==
Nestor was abandoned in 1929.
