= America (1899 steamboat) =

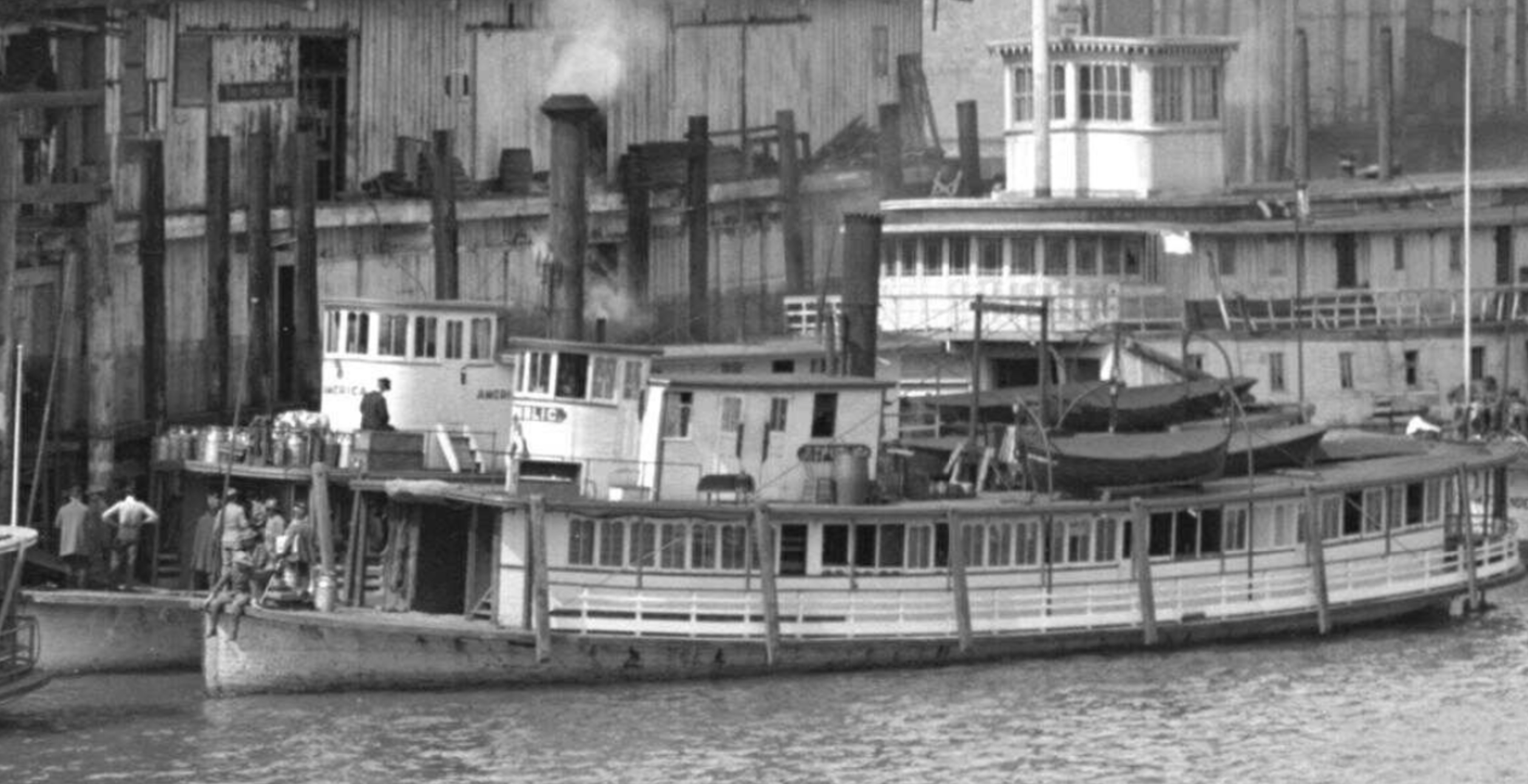
- America (left), Republic (center) and unidentified large steamer (right) at Portland, circa 1905.

History
- Name: America
- Owner: James Good
- Route: Lower Columbia and lower Willamette rivers
- In service: 1899
- Out of service: 1911
- Identification: U.S. 107437
- Fate: Dismantled

General characteristics
- Type: inland steamship
- Tonnage: 99 GT; 67 NT
- Length: 93.9 ft (28.6 m)\
- Beam: 20 ft (6.1 m)
- Depth: 6.2 ft (1.9 m) depth of hold
- Installed power: steam engine
- Propulsion: propeller

America was a steamboat which operated in the state of Oregon, on the upper Willamette River and Multnomah Channel from 1899 to 1911. This vessel should not be confused with America, a steamer of similar design, built in 1912 in Portland, Oregon.

== Construction ==
America was built by Captain James Good for the run from Portland up the Multnomah Channel, then known as the Willamette Slough to St. Helens, Oregon.

America was 93.9 ft (28.6 m) long, with a beam of 20 ft (6.1 m) and depth of hold of 6.2 ft (1.9 m). Overall size of the vessel was 99 gross tons; 67 net tons, with tons being a measure of volume and not weight. The engines generated 100 indicated horsepower and turned a single propeller. The merchant vessel registry number was 107437.

As built, America was a coal-burner. The steamer consumed a little less than one ton of coal in the run from St. Helens to Portland. In April 1904 America was refitted to be an oil burner.

== Operations ==
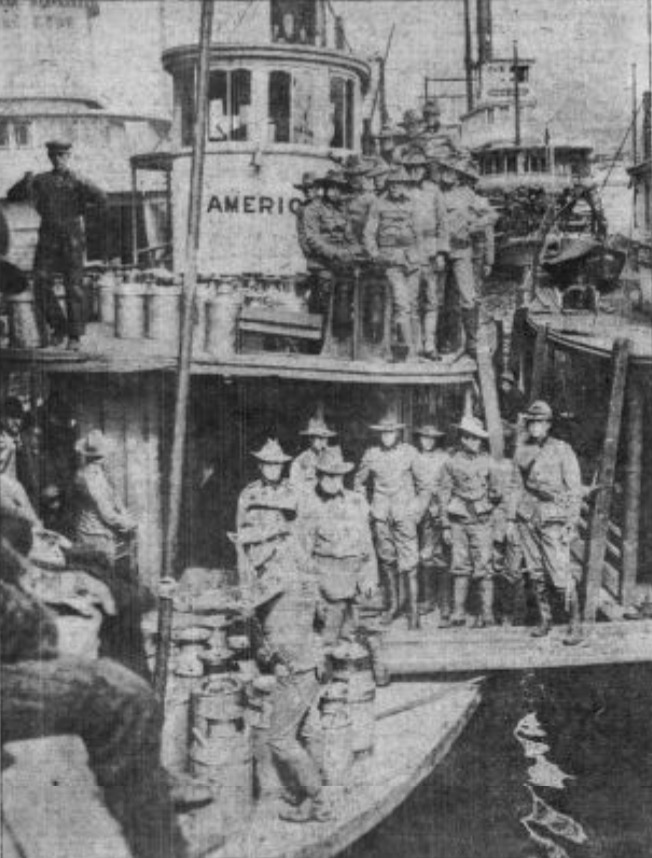
America embarking cadets from the Newill Military Academy, April 21, 1905.

A trial trip was taken on March 12, 1899, on the Portland-St. Helens route. America’s schedule in March 1899 was a daily route, leaving St. Helens at 7:30 a.m., arriving in Portland at 10:30 a.m. Returning the steamer departed Portland at 2:30 p.m., arriving at St. Helens at 6:00 p.m. Captain Good advertised the new steamer as carrying "nothing but passengers and fast freight." Fare was 50 cents. America made 25 to 30 landings along the route.

On September 14, 1904, most of the business district of St. Helens was destroyed by fire. America was at the dock at the time, and was able to keep a warehouse and a merchandise store from burning by playing the steamer's firehose on the buildings.

== Drowning of passenger during rescue ==
On March 8, 1904, 12-year-old Zoe Brown fell from the passenger deck of America through a broken railing. The railing had been broken two days before in a collision with a dock, and not repaired.

Sumner "Jack" Smith, aged 26, a passenger on America, leapt into the river to save the child. Smith, who was reported to have been a strong swimmer, was able to reach the child and hold her above water. A boat was launched from the steamer, and was able to reach Smith and the child. The child was brought into the boat, and saved, but Smith drowned before he could be taken aboard. Following a hearing conducted before steamboat inspectors Edwards and Fuller, Captain Good was found guilty of negligence in not having the railing repaired, and his license was suspended for 30 days.

== Fireman drowns ==
On August 1, 1905, William Brown, a fireman, fell overboard from America while the steamer was at the Washington Street dock in Portland, about thirty minutes before the boat was to depart for St. Helens. Brown had stepped backwards over the side of the vessel while sweeping the deck. At least twenty people at the dock and on the steamer saw Brown fall in the water, but no one did any to help him, such as throw out a line or a plank. The fireman drowned, and his body was recovered just about the time America was set to depart. Brown's body was laid on the dock, then taken to the morgue. Meanwhile, freight was being loaded on the steamer, passengers were embarking, and with a new fireman on board, the boat departed on time.

== Near destruction by fire ==
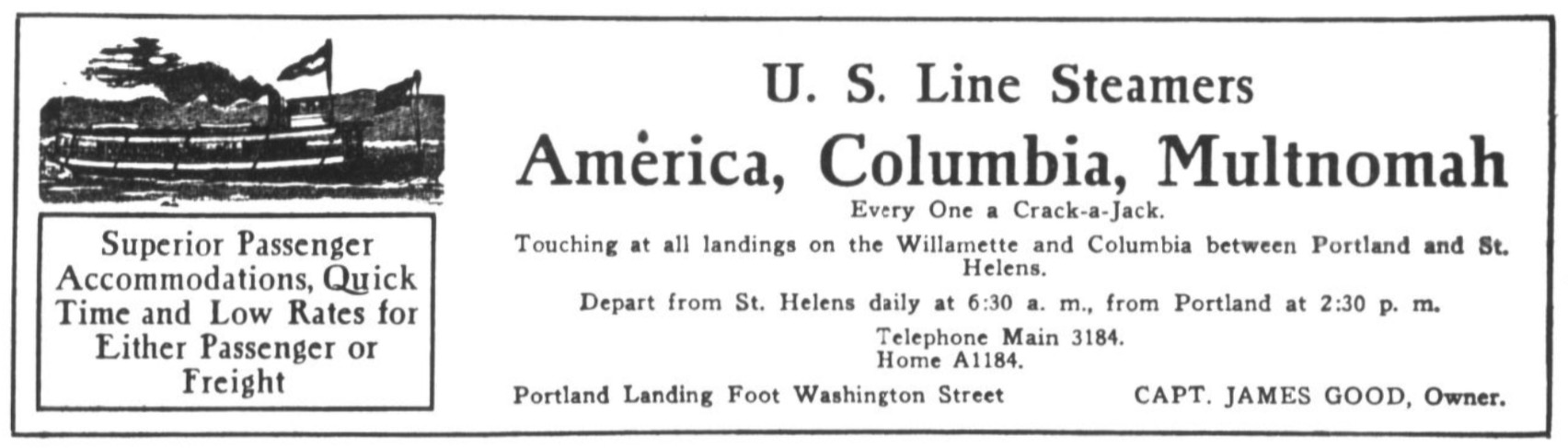
Advertisement for America and other steamers, placed September 8, 1907 in the Oregon Daily Journal.

On September 7, 1907, America caught fire and suffered serious damage. The fire started about 4:00 a.m. when the steamer was lying at the Muckle Bros. wharf in St. Helens. The fire was thought to have started from a gas explosion in the firebox. The fire spread from the boat to the wharf, and then to the Muckle Bros. warehouse, which was destroyed. America had an estimated value of $9,000, and was insured for $4,000.

The wreck was towed to Portland. On October 25, 1907, it was reported that Captain Good, owner of America, had decided to have the boat pulled out at Supple's yard in Portland, to be rebuilt. Reconstruction was expected to take two months. By January 1, 1908, Captain Good, doing business as the U.S. Line, was advertising service on America again.

== Legal problems ==
On January 14, 1908, it was reported that a libel action had been filed in the circuit court against America by Theodore Knudson and Carl L. Stoneburg of Theodore Knudson & Co. The claim was that Knudson and Stoneburg entered into a contract with James Good to repair America, that they had expended $5,165.78 worth of labor and materials, that Good had paid them only $2,700 and had refused to pay the balance.

== Disposition ==
In August 1911, it was announced America would be dismantled, with the engines to go to a new steamer, also named America. The new steamer was launched in 1912.
