= Cowlitz (sternwheeler) =

Shallow-draft sternwheeler built for service on the Cowlitz River

History
- Name: Cowlitz
- Owner: Columbia & Cowlitz Transportation Company; Smith Transportation Company; Shaver Transportation Company; Columbia River Navigation Company
- Route: Columbia, Cowlitz, and lower Willamette rivers.
- Builder: Portland Shipbuilding Company
- Completed: 1917
- Identification: U.S. 214769
- Fate: Sunk in Columbia River, near The Dalles, July 30, 1931

General characteristics
- Type: Riverine towboat
- Tonnage: 99 GRT; 72 registered.
- Length: As built 102.9 ft (31.4 m) over hull (exclusive of fantail)
- Beam: 26.6 ft 9 in (8.3 m) over hull (exclusive of guards
- Depth: 4.8 ft 0 in (1.46 m)
- Decks: 2 (main and passenger)
- Installed power: twin steam engines, horizontally mounted, each with bore of 14 in (360 mm) and stroke of 6 ft (180 cm); 390 ihp (290 kW)
- Propulsion: stern-wheel

Cowlitz was a shallow-draft sternwheeler built for service on the Cowlitz River in southwestern Washington State. The vessel also served on the Columbia River. Cowlitz was in service from 1917 until September 1931, when, not far from The Dalles, Oregon, it sank in the Columbia River in a storm.

== Construction ==
Cowlitz was built at Portland, Oregon in 1917. Cowlitz was constructed by the Portland Shipbuilding Company for Milton Smith (1874–1951) doing business as the Columbia & Cowlitz River Transportation Company.

During construction, there was a strike at the Portland Shipbuilding company 24 men walked off the job when the company manager, refused to reinstate an employee who had been recently discharged. There was talk that the men would also demand an increase of pay from $4 per day to $5 days per day. Marine carpenters were then in demand because of a boom in wooden shipping construction.

Work on the vessel was completed by March 8, 1917, and on that date the steamer was issued an inspection certificate.

== Dimensions and engineering ==
Cowlitz was 109.2 feet (33.3 m) long exclusive of the fantail, which was the extension over the stern on which the stern-wheel was mounted. The vessel's beam was 26.6 feet (8.1 m), exclusive of the protective timbers guards extending out from the hull at the level of the main deck. Cowlitz's depth of hold was 4.8 feet. The overall size was 99 gross register tons (GRT) and 72 registered tons. The twin horizontally mounted single-cylinder steam engines developed 350 indicated horsepower (260 kW). The official merchant vessel registry number was 214769. The cargo capacity was 100 tons.

Cowlitz was equipped with two horizontal non-condensing engines, each with a 14-inch (360 mm) bore and a 6-foot (1.8 m) stroke, producing 390 estimated horsepower.

== Reduction in measured tonnage ==
By 1919, the sides of the lower deck had been removed to bring the ship's measured size below 100 tons. This permitted a reduction in the required crew by one less officer (mate) position.

== Operations ==
Stern-wheel steamers Service (center), Cowlitz (center), and Nestor (right), tied up at a dock, probably at Rainier, Oregon, some time between 1917 and 1929.

In June 1917, the newly built Cowlitz took the place of another steamer owned by Milton Smith, the Nestor on the Cowlitz River run, while Nestor was taken to a shipyard in Oregon for a thorough overhaul. On December 2, 1921, the steamer La Center, en route from Kelso with a load of cattle for the Portland stockyards, capsized in a storm. Thirty-five of the 40 head of cattle on board were drowned. Cowlitz however, was able to rescue the crewman of La Center.

In early December 1922, the pilot of the Cowlitz, was arrested by the Portland police, and charged with complicity in a murder of a 15-year-old girl by his father, with the killing said to have occurred on his father's houseboat in the Willamette River. The specific charge against the pilot was that he had helped his father conceal the body.

On September 12, 1928, a crewman on Cowlitz, was injured while making fast a line from a log raft. The crewman brought an action against Smith Transportation Company, the owners of the Cowlitz, in the U.S. District Court, seeking $15,000 in damages. On April 16, 1929, Judge George M. Bourquin gave a directed verdict for Smith Transportation Company, ruling that no negligence had been established by Alfred and the only negligence that had been shown was that of the crewman himself.

== Rescue work at the Allen Street bridge disaster ==
Cowlitz rescued survivors when the Cowlitz River bridge at Kelso, Washington collapsed on January 3, 1923, in what became known as the Allen Street Bridge disaster. Cowlitz picked up nine survivors on the steamer's first trip, including a small boy, but three or four others drifted by clinging to wreckage, but the steamer was unable to reach them. According to one survivor, who had been driving an automobile across the bridge at the time of the collapse:

I thought I was done for … Less than a minute more would have finished me. I was ready to quit. Then the steamer Cowlitz was beside me, and someone through me a rope, and I was shivering on deck. I noticed that I had hurt my arm. Upstream there were men, women and children in the water. Some drifted by, riding on wreckage, or just managing to swim. The crew of the Cowlitz could not help them all. They could only take those that were nearest. Just beyond reach a man was struggling. They threw a life preserver to him and he tried to touch it. He tried and he couldn’t. I guess it was all the strength he had left, for he slipped under the water without a sound and was gone.

== Part of the Shaver fleet ==
Captain Milton Smith (1874–1951), long-term owner of Cowlitz.

In February 1930, Milton Smith's company, Smith Transportation, which had been incorporated in 1926, merged with the Shaver Transportation Company. The president of the new organization would be Captain Delmar Shaver and the vice-president would be Captain Milton Smith. The headquarters of the merged company would be in Portland, at the foot of Fessenden Street in St. Johns.

== Sale and transfer to Columbia Gorge service ==
Cowlitz depicted in The Oregonian, September 1930

In early September 1930, Cowlitz was purchased from the Shaver Transportation Company by the Columbia River Navigation Company. The new owners placed Cowlitz on a route on the Columbia River, running under J.W. Exon, as captain, between Portland, Hood River, White Salmon, and The Dalles. Exon had organized the Columbia River Navigation Company and was its president. The first trip on the route was made on September 8, 1930, with the boat departing from Supple's Dock in Portland, at the foot of Belmont Street, at 7:00 p.m.

Captain Exon's business plan was to charge rates lower than rail transport, and match truck rates. Reportedly the demand for steamer services was so great by September 1930 that it would probably be necessary for the line to purchase another steamboat in the near future. Freight was to be picked up, hauled to the dock by trucks, and delivered to the consignee when the boat reached a landing.

== Sinking ==
On July 30, 1931, Cowlitz departed The Dalles, Oregon at 11:40 am, with Captain Exon and 11 members of the crew. While proceeding down river from The Dalles, with a full load of 100 tons of wheat on board, Cowlitz encountered a 25-mile-per-hour (40 km/h) headwind and large waves. The wind from the west was described as the worst on the river in years. Water flooded the engine room.

Captain Exon tried to turn the boat towards shore, but then another wave hit, reportedly causing the cargo to shift. The steamer then capsized so suddenly that only two men were able to grab life preservers. About five miles (8.0 km) west of The Dalles, the boat sank in about 50 feet (15 m) of water. Only a few of the men could swim. The boat came to pieces, with the hull sinking almost immediately and the superstructure floating free. All the members of the crew were able to survive, by hanging on to the floating wreckage, although some were in the water for more than an hour. No one was drowned, largely because of the amount of wreckage, including spars, stove wood, oil drums and other loose articles, that the men could cling on to. The Rowena ferry launched a boat to rescue the men, and a motorist on the highway, who witnessed the capsize, found a telephone and placed calls to Rowena and The Dalles for assistance. Both the boat and the cargo were fully covered by insurance.
