= Bailey Gatzert (sternwheeler) =

American steamboat

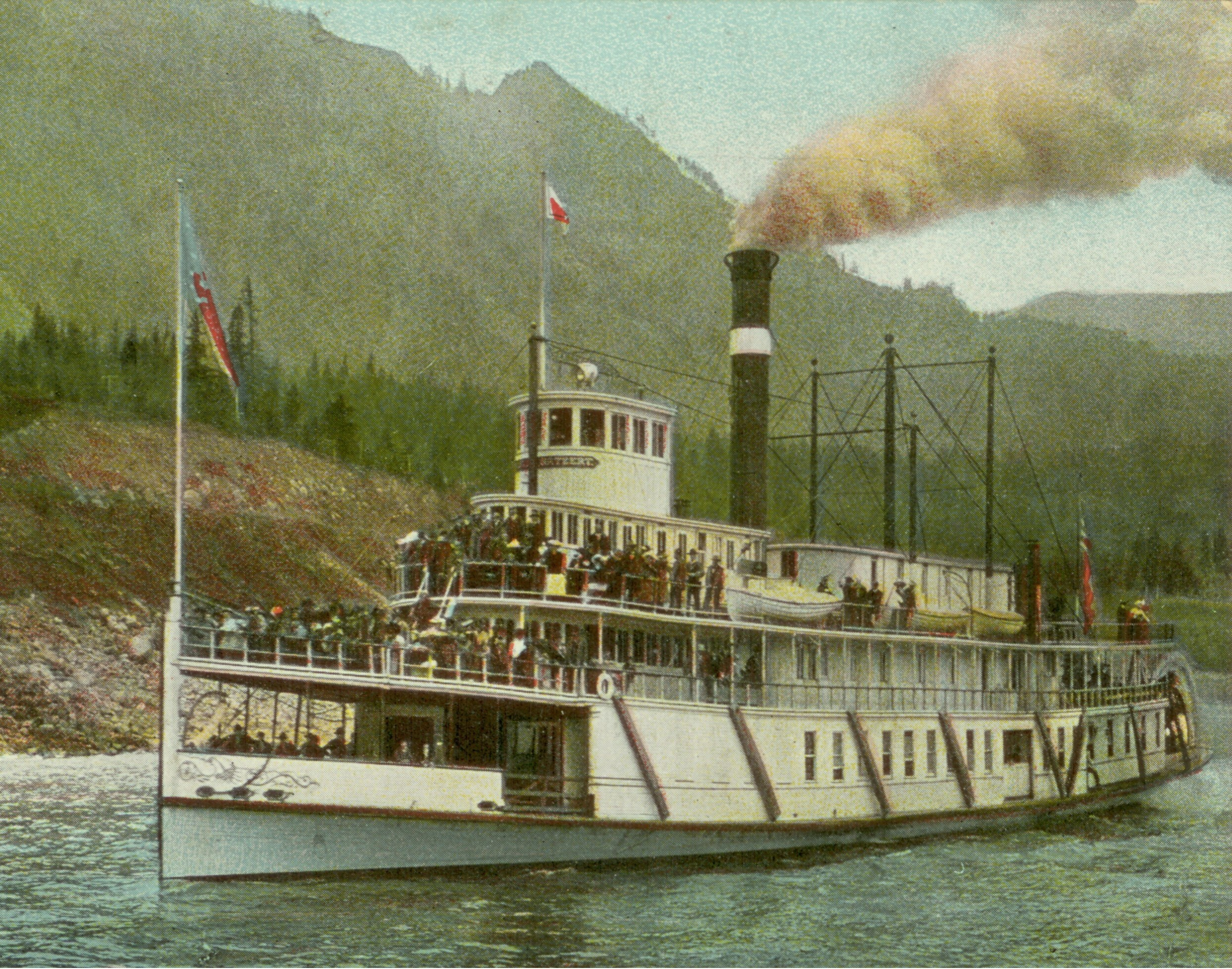
- Bailey Gatzert approaching Cascade Locks, circa 1910

History
- Name: Bailey Gatzert
- Route: Puget Sound (several routes), Columbia River
- Builder: J.J. Holland yard, Ballard, Washington
- Launched: 1890
- In service: 1890
- Out of service: 1925
- Fate: Dismantled
- Notes: Reconstructed and enlarged 1907, later converted to auto ferry

General characteristics
- Type: inland steamship
- Tonnage: 276
- Length: 177 ft (53.9 m), and after reconstruction, 191 ft (58.2 m)
- Beam: 32 ft (9.8 m)
- Depth: 8 ft (2 m) depth of hold
- Decks: three (freight, passenger, boat)
- Propulsion: twin horizontally mounted steam engines; sternwheel
- Speed: 18 knots (approx. 20 miles per hour)
- Capacity: Licensed in 1907 to regularly carry 350 passengers and 625 on excursions.

The Bailey Gatzert was a sternwheel steamboat that ran on the Columbia River and Puget Sound, in Washington state, US, from the 1890s to the 1920s. This vessel was considered one of the finest of its time. It was named after Bailey Gatzert, an early businessman and mayor of Seattle, who was one of the closest friends and business associates of John Leary – the person who financed the ship.

Bailey Gatzert probably carried more passengers than any other Columbia River steamer. It was considered to be one of the most beautiful river boats, mainly because its upper deck ran all the way out to the bow.

== Ownership and cost ==
Bailey Gatzert was built for John Leary (1837–1905). The steamer was reported to have cost $100,000 to construct.

According to another report, the Bailey Gatzert was built for the Seattle Steam Navigation & Transportation Company, which had been incorporated in Seattle on May 31, 1890, with a capital stock of $500,000, by John Leary, Jacob Furth, Edward Newfleder, Wm.R. Ballard, and Harry K. Struve (1866–1924).

== Construction ==
Bailey Gatzert was built in the shipyard of John J. Holland (1843–1893) at Ballard, Washington. The machinery for the steamer was manufactured by the James Rees Iron and Machine Works, in Pittsburgh, Pennsylvania. Holland was an experienced shipbuilder who had previously constructed the prominent steamers Wide West and R.R. Thompson.

The machinery was scheduled to be delivered to the Bailey Gatzert by July 15, 1890, but it did not arrive on time from the east. As of July 20, the Rees firm was reported to be working on the machinery "night and day." Work on the cabin structure of the steamer almost done by July 20, with the pilot house next to be built.

Work was still ongoing on August 11, 1890, when a carload of machinery, including the sternwheel shaft, cylinders, donkey-pumps, and part of the smokestack arrived over the Northern Pacific Railway. Work was expected to be finished by September 15, 1890. However, the boilers did not arrive at Ballard until October 4, after a five-week delay.

== Engineering and dimensions ==
Bailey Gatzert was driven by two twin horizontally mounted single-cylinder poppet valve steam engines, each with a 22-inch interior bore diameter and an 84-inch stroke on the piston rod. These engines could drive the steamer at a speed of over 20 miles per hour. The engines generated 1,300 horsepower, enough it was said at the time of its launch, to make Bailey Gatzert the fastest steamer on Puget Sound. According to an official source, the engines generated 1,150 nominal horsepower and 1,300 indicated horsepower. The sternwheel had 17 "buckets" (paddles), each of which was 18 feet long.

The boiler was a steel locomotive type, also manufactured by James Rees & Sons. The total heating surface was 3800 square feet. The firebox had a grate surface of 49 square feet. The underwater portion of the steamer's hull was coated with a copper-based bottom paint. As built no sleeping accommodations were installed, limiting the vessel to day trips. The vessel was originally a wood burner, and could consume up to three cords of wood an hour.

According to a newspaper report, Bailey Gatzert was 208 feet long overall, with a length of 180 feet measured over the keel. The beam (width) of the vessel was 32 feet. The official dimensions of the steamer as built were: 177.3 feet length over the hull, exclusive of the extension of the main deck, called the fantail, over the stern, on which the sternwheel was mounted, 32.3 foot beam (width) and 8:0 foot depth of hold. The official merchant vessel registry number was 3488.

== Launch and trial trip ==
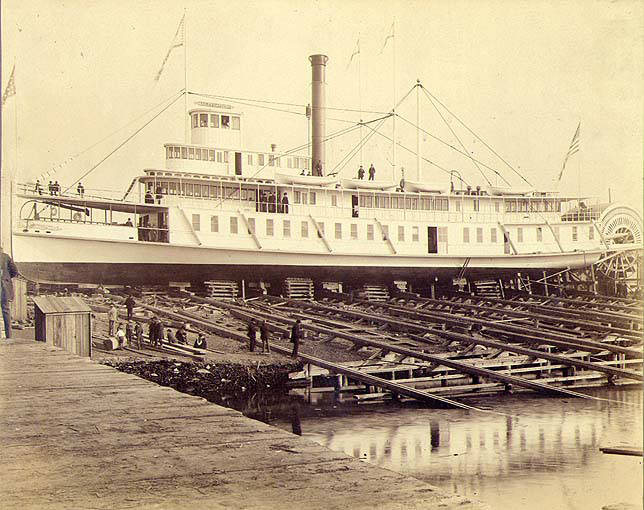
Bailey Gatzert on the shipways at the John J. Holland yard, in Ballard, Washington, probably just prior to launch on Saturday, November 22, 1890.

Bailey Gatzert was launched on Saturday, November 22, 1890, at 1:00 p.m. before 1,500 spectators. The launch was originally scheduled to occur at noon, but was delayed for an hour to allow the tide to come in.

The steamer had been built on a cradle sideways to the water's edge 100 yards away. With the ways 177 feet long to accommodate the steamer's hull, this was the longest sideways launching ever attempted on the Pacific Coast of the United States.

Four hundred people were on board as the boat slid down into the water after the builder, Capt. J.J. Holland gave the word and the workman knocked away the restraining blocks. As the steamer entered the water, Captain Holland's young son, Willie Holland, broke a bottle of champagne over its bow.

Bailey Gatzert had steam up before the launch and was operational when it entered the water. Capt. George Hill was in the pilot house and he ordered the engines to be started, and the vessel began its first trip, out towards the mouth of Salmon Bay and then south to Seattle. On board at the time were several prominent steamboat men, captains James W. Troupe, J.N. McAlpine, and Captain Clancy of the Union Pacific steamboat division. Some final work needed to be done after the launch, including fitting details and installation of the dynamo for the electric lights.

== Operations ==
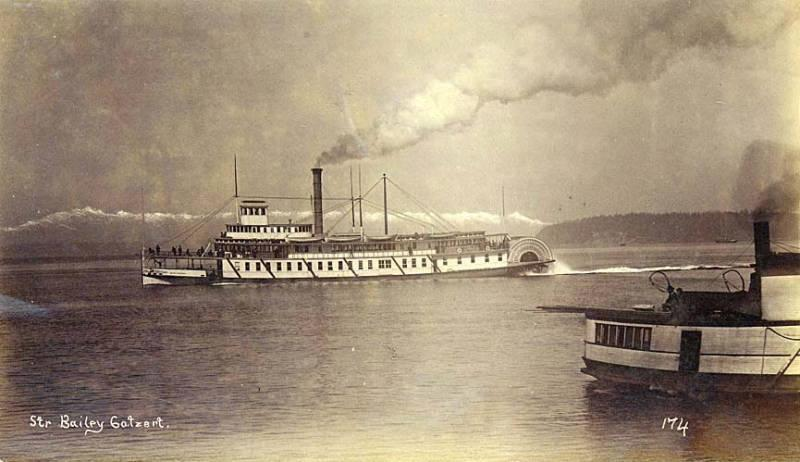
Bailey Gatzert at Seattle circa 1891, with the Olympic Mountains visible in the distance

On August 22, 1890, it was reported that Captain George Hill, previously of the steamer Henry Bailey, had accepted the position of captain of Bailey Gatzert, then still under construction.

Starting Saturday, December 13, 1890, Bailey Gatzert was running twice daily on the Seattle-Tacoma route, departing from Baker's Wharf, at the foot of Seneca street, at 8:00 a.m., and 3:00 p.m., and, on the return, departing Tacoma at 10:00 a.m. and 5:00 p.m.

Bailey Gatzert was damaged while docked in a windstorm that struck Seattle on December 25, 1890.

On January 19, 1891, Bailey Gatzert took an excursion of nearly 300 people to Olympia, Washington, making what was reported to have been the shortest running time then on record between the two cities, about three hours and 25 minutes. The steamer left Seattle at 9:12 a.m., and ran south along the west side of Vashon Island, through Colvos Passage, then known as the "West Passage". During this trip, the vessel stopped for about 15 minutes off Milton Point to repair the steam steering mechanism.

On January 28, 1891, Bailey Gatzert was taken off the Seattle-Tacoma run because the business on the route was insufficient to make the steamer profitable. The Gatzert had lost about $2,000 in the time it had been operating on the run. It was hoped that the steamer could be returned to the Seattle-Tacoma route sometime in April. Bailey Gatzert could not be used on an overnight or other long route because it had no sleeping accommodations.

Captains of the Gatzert in its first years on Puget Sound were Harry Struve, Henry Carter (1858–1930), John Jordison (b.1863), and others.

== New owners ==
Bailey Gatzert made only a few runs for its original owners before being sold to the Columbia River and Puget Sound Navigation Company (CR&PSN), which was also called the White Collar Line.

In early February 1891, the articles of incorporation of CR&PSN had been filed in Portland, Oregon. The capital stock was $500,000, and the incorporators were John Leary, of Seattle, Capt. Uriah Bonser "U.B." Scott (1827–1913) and Lamar Boudinot "L.B." Seeley (1851–1932), both of Portland, and Ernest Whitcomb Crichton (1850–1913), of Oswego, Oregon U.B. Scott was the president, John Leary, vice-president, L.B. Seeley, second vice-president, E.W. Crichton (or Creighton), secretary-treasurer. E.A. Seeley and Capt. Z.J. Hatch were directors, but Hatch's interest was soon bought out by the other principals in the firm. S.H. Brown was another founder of the company.

The new company was going to operate steamboats on Puget Sound and on the Columbia River, specifically Flyer, Bailey Gatzert, and Antelope.

By February 21, 1891, Bailey Gatzert was back on a route from Seattle to Tacoma and Olympia, in place of the slower propeller steamer Fleetwood, which was also owned by U.B. Scott. Bailey Gatzert was much faster than Fleetwood, and was scheduled to make the Seattle-Tacoma run in 1 hour 45 minutes.

== Racing against Greyhound ==
On April 21, 1891, Bailey Gatzert raced the sternwheeler Greyhound from Tacoma to Seattle and back. The distance on this route was 28 miles.

Greyhound was then a new vessel, built in 1890, with low cabin structure and a large stern-wheel, so much so that the Hound, as the steamer was called, was said to be "all wheel and whistle." On the morning of April 21, 1891, both the Gatzert and the Hound were at the dock in Tacoma, when about 10:30 a.m. rumors began to spread that there would be a race between the two vessels on the route back to Seattle. Hundreds of people crowded onto the docks to witness the event.

At 10:30 a.m. Greyhound, under Captain G.H. Parker, cast off lines and moved out into the water, waiting for the Gatzert, which at the same time blew the whistle indicating departure. However, just at that time a tiller block, part of the steering gear, broke on Gatzert, which required 45 minutes to fix. The Greyhound steamed around, waiting for the Gatzert.

Finally, with the steering gear repaired, Captain Z.J. Hatch on Gatzert gave the order to go ahead to the engine room, and both steamers left Tacoma at high speed, blowing huge amounts of black smoke from their stacks, with Gatzert in the lead. By the time they reached the turning point in the channel at Point Robinson, Bailey Gatzert was well ahead of Greyhound, and the race seemed over. Greyhound had used much of its freshwater supply in waiting for the Gatzert at Tacoma, and by the time Point Robinson was reached, Greyhound's chief engineer Claude Trump had to use salt water in the boilers, which further reduced Greyhound's steam pressure and speed.

By the time the Greyhound reached Alki Point, Bailey Gatzert was well ahead, but with more fuel feed into the firebox, Greyhound was able to close the gap, and by Duwamish Head, Greyhound was only 500 yards behind the Gatzert. At about this time, the steamers were recognized from the docks in Seattle, causing an excited ground to gather. During the remaining three miles across Elliott Bay, Greyhound continued to gain, but Bailey Gatzert was still first into the dock. However, on the return trip to Tacoma, where the steamers also raced, Greyhound beat the Gatzert by one and one-half minutes.

== Loss of a trophy ==
The Union Pacific at that time had recently completed the steamer T.J. Potter, which was operating on Puget Sound. When Captain Troup, who was the manager of the Union Pacific's maritime division, noticed one day that John Leary and J.J. Holland, to honor Bailey Gatzert's speedy time between Tacoma and Seattle, were installing a silver-plated statue of a greyhound in the Gatzert's pilot house. Troup bet Leary and Holland that if T.J. Potter could best the Gatzert in a race, that they would turn over the greyhound trophy to the Potter.

A few days later, after Troup had returned to Portland, he received a telegram from Archie Pease, captain of the Potter, who had been informed of the wager: "Passed the Gatzert this morning and led her into Seattle. Time 1:22½" Troup immediately replied: "Get the dog." Later that day, Pease sent a telegram back to Troup: "Got the dog. It now adorns the pilot house of the T.J. Potter."

== Transfer to the Columbia River ==
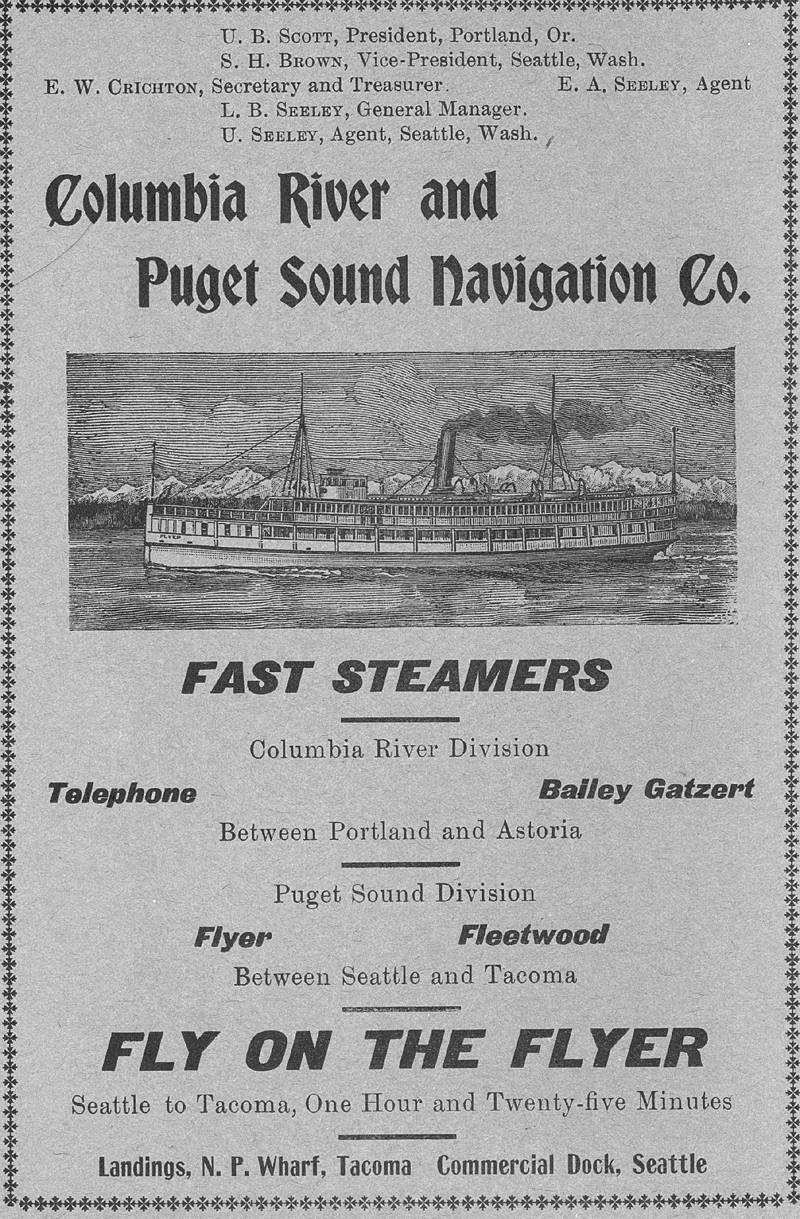
Advertisement for the steamers of the Columbia River and Puget Sound Navigation Company, with Bailey Gatzert and Telephone running on the Columbia River.

In 1892, Bailey Gatzert was transferred, under Capt. Gill Parker, to the Columbia River. Once on the Columbia, the steamer was used in excursions and as a spare boat until 1895, when it was extensively overhauled and then placed on the Portland-Astoria route. Captains in the early years on the Columbia were U.B. Scott, Frank B. Turner, Thomas Crang, and W.E. Larkins.

On October 14, 1892, Bailey Gatzert was at Neah Bay, presumably en route to the Columbia river.

In June 1893 it was reported that Bailey Gatzert would be put on the run from Portland to Clatsop Beach in the coming summer.

On July 1, 1893, Bailey Gatzert was reported to be running in the excursion business in the Columbia River Gorge.

== Proposed transfer to San Francisco ==
On July 19, 1893, it was reported that Bailey Gatzert had been purchased by parties from San Francisco, with the intent to use the steamer on the ferry run between that city and Oakland for the Davie line of ferries. Bailey Gatzert was intended to make a voyage south from the mouth of the Columbia River to San Francisco, which, if it had been accomplished, would have been one of the longest trips ever made by a sternwheeler on the Pacific coast. The only previous time this had been done was when the Annie Steward had come from San Francisco to be run in opposition to the Oregon Steam Navigation Company's Dixie Thompson.

The sale did not go through; the negotiations appear to have stumbled upon the point of whether the buyer or the seller should pay to have the vessel transferred to San Francisco.

== Rivalry on the Astoria route ==
In 1895, the chief competition for the Bailey Gatzert on the Astoria route were a pair of fast steamers owned by the Oregon Railway and Navigation Company, the T.J. Potter, which had been brought around from Puget Sound back to the Columbia River, and the R.R. Thompson. OR&N also brought to the Columbia River the old sidewheeler North Pacific to handle the traffic from Astoria to the seaside resorts near Ilwaco, Washington.

To meet this challenge, CR&PSN spent nearly $20,000 in remodeling Bailey Gatzert into "one of the finest sternwheel steamers afloat." They also chartered the sidewheeler Ocean Wave, which was operated as a through boat from Portland to Ilwaco. Bailey Gatzert alternated with the CR&PSN's elite sternwheeler Telephone, reputedly the fastest river steamer in the world, providing Astoria with the best river steamer service that it had ever had. New machinery was installed into the boat by engineer Charles H. Jennings (b.1851).

On Sunday, March 3, 1895, Bailey Gatzert was to make a trial trip at Portland, Oregon, with the crew on board only. However, this did not take place due to a cracked steam feed pipe, which had to be replaced. On March 4, 1895, A. McGillis, steward of the fast steamer Telephone was assigned to superintend the fitting out of the interior of the Bailey Gatzert. On March 11, 1895, Bailey Gatzert arrived at Astoria. Bailey Gatzert departed Portland at 7:00 a.m., carrying the officers of the steamer's owners, the Columbia River and Puget Sound Navigation Company, and a large number of other passengers.

An upper cabin deck, called a texas, had been constructed on the steamer. In the texas were fourteen staterooms, each with two single berths. These were said to be the best staterooms on the boat, because they were away from the noise of the lower decks and well-ventilated. The lower staterooms had two double berths in each. Two "exquisitely furnished" "'bridal chambers'" were located just off of the ladies cabin.

The steward, McGillis, and the purser, Donahue, had cabins on the main cabin deck Up in the forward part of the texas there were cabins for the officers, including Captain Crang, Pilot Larkins, and Chief Engineer Evans. The steamer was now equipped with electric lighting, as well as new steam-driven steering gear, reportedly superior to the hydraulic gear installed on Telephone. New cylinders had been fitted into the steam engines, and a system of electric engine room telegraph bells had been installed.

== Operations on the Columbia River ==
=== The Portland-Astoria run ===
In March 1895, Bailey Gatzert made daily runs (except Sunday) from Portland to Astoria, departing from the dock at the foot of Alder Street at 7:00 p.m., on the downriver run, and, on the return, departing from Astoria at 7:00 p.m. At Astoria, connections were made to Ilwaco, Washington via the steamer Ilwaco, which called at Astoria every night. Tickets of all other lines were good for the Gatzert.

The Bailey Gatzert had a unique four note musical steam whistle which had once been installed in the fast steamer Telephone. In March 1895 the steamer was having some difficulty with the whistle, so much so that it was said to have sounded "like the bellowing of a cow just recovering from a severe attack of the grippe." By March 28, however, the whistle had been restored to its traditional sound. Reportedly, attempts to build another steam whistle on the Telephone, with the same sound, all failed.

In May, 1895, Bailey Gatzert departed from Flavel's Wharf in Astoria, opposite to the Occident Hotel, daily at 7:00 p.m. for Portland, Sundays excepted. Fares one-way were $1.00, round trip, $1.50. The steamer's agency in Astoria was C.W. Stone.

In September 1895, the CR&PSN was running two steamers daily from Astoria to Portland. Telephone, the evening boat to Portland, departed Astoria at 7:00 p.m. daily except Sundays, and left Portland daily at 7:00 a.m. for Astoria.

Bailey Gatzert, the morning boat, left Astoria Tuesday, Wednesday, Thursday, Friday, and Saturday mornings at 6:45 a.m., and Sunday evening at 7:00 p.m., for Portland. The Gatzert departed Portland on the return Astoria daily at 8:00 p.m., except Saturday, when it left at 11:00 p.m., with no departure from Portland on Sunday.

Every Tuesday and Thursday, at 8:00 a.m., the Ocean Wave ran straight through from Portland to Ilwaco, Washington, where it met the narrow gauge trains of the Ilwaco Railway and Navigation Company, which made connections with the resorts and other stops on the North Beach of Pacific County, Washington. Ocean Wave departed Ilwaco for Portland on Wednesday and Friday mornings at 7:30, Sunday night at 5:00. E.A. Seeley was the company's general agent in Portland.

=== Unionization ===
In August 1897, the deck hands of a number of river steamers, including the Bailey Gatzert, formed a union and on Saturday, August 21, 1897, they went out on strike. The hands sought a raise in pay from $35 a month to $40 a month.

=== Railroad competition ===
The railroad from Portland to Astoria was completed on April 4, 1898, but the first train, carrying 700 people, did not arrive until May 16. Rail service was able to advertise travel from Portland to Astoria in three and one-half hours. The fast time of a steamer on the Portland-Astoria river route was that of Telephone, which on July 4, 1887, made the 105 mile trip in 4 hours and 34¾ minutes. Completion of the railroad cut down sharply on the demand for river steamer service between Portland and Astoria.

As of October 1899, fares had been reduced on the Gatzert's Portland-Astoria run, to 50 cents, with staterooms costing $1.25, and other berths less than one dollar. On December 3, 1900, the place of Bailey Gatzert on the Astoria run was taken by the steamer Hercules, while the Gatzert, having been in continuous service for almost two years, was withdrawn from service for an overhaul. Fairs on Hercules were just 25 cents for a trip to Astoria. The overhaul was complete on April 12, 1901, and the Gatzert was back on the Astoria run.

=== Portland–The Dalles route ===
Gatzert was not long on the Astoria route, and was reassigned to a run up the Columbia River Gorge on May 10, 1901, or before. Hercules again replaced Bailey Gatzert on the Astoria route. E. W. Crichton was the White Collar Line's agent in Portland, while A. J. Taylor was the company's agent in Astoria.

About $25,000 was spent remodeling Bailey Gatzert in preparation for its new route up the Columbia River. The old poppet-valve engines were replaced by the slide valve engines from the steamer Telephone. Auxiliary rudders were installed to improve steering in the swift waters of the Columbia Gorge. Hull and cabin work was done by veteran shipbuilder Joseph Pacquet. The officers on the steamer at that time were Captain Fred Sherman, pilot Sydney Scammon, mate John Schiller, chief engineer Ruben Smith, and Dan O'Neil, purser. Smith and O'Neil were two of the most experienced officers on the Columbia river, each having worked on the early steamer Columbia in the 1850s.

Bailey Gatzert passed Hood River on first regular trip on Tuesday, May 14, 1901, at 2:00. The steamer was advertised as making a roundtrip from Portland to The Dalles, departing Portland at 7:00 a.m. and leaving from The Dalles on the return trip at 5:00 p.m. In early July, 1901, running under the White Collar Line, the Gatzert was running between Portland and The Dalles daily except Sunday, when excursions were run. The steamer Tahoma was then running to Astoria on the Gatzert's old route. John M. Fillon was the line's agent in The Dalles. Prather & Barnes were the company's agents in Hood River.

During the summers of 1901 and 1902, the Gatzert was reported to have "handled immense crowds of tourists". Gatzert was the first steamer to be able to make a round trip from Portland to The Dalles in one day. In June 1902, Gatzert set a record time on the run from The Dalles to Portland while carrying an excursion of members of the A.O.U.W.

In 1903, the Columbia River & Puget Sound Navigation Company merged with The Dalles, Astoria & Portland Navigation Company, also known as the Regulator Line. This gave rise to "the most spectacular period of rivalry on the lower river" between Captain Scott's boats, the Gatzert and Telephone, the Oregon Railway and Navigation Company's Hassalo and T.J. Potter, and the independent steamer Charles R. Spencer, owned by Capt. Ernest W. Spencer. (1852–1930).

By the end of July 1903, the steamers of the Regulator Line were making a connection with the Columbia River & Northern Railway, at Lyle, Washington, which would then carry passengers and freight to Wahkeans, Daly, Centerville, Goldendale and all Klickitat Valley points. H.C. Campbell was the manager of the Regulator line at this time.

The Gatzert was taken off the Columbia Gorge route during the winter of 1903–1904. In February 1904, it was reported that the company was considering converting Bailey Gatzert into an oil-burner. In 1905 a new locomotive-type firebox boiler was installed.

=== Lewis and Clark Exposition ===
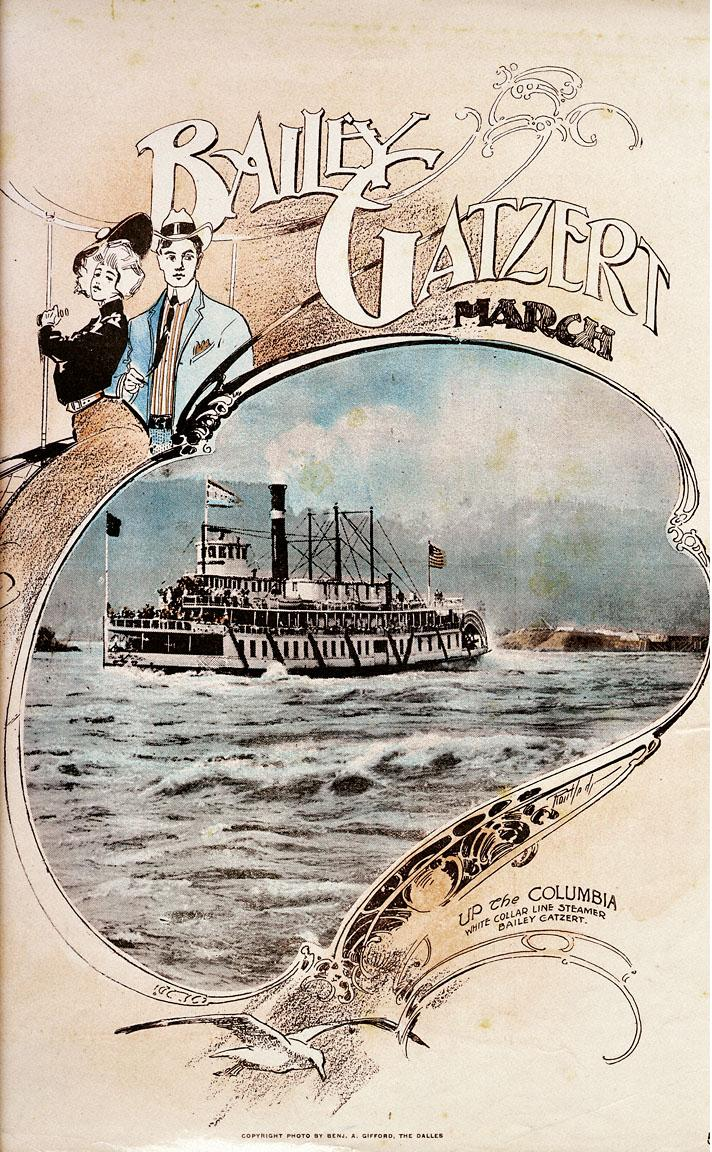
Cover sheet for the Bailey Gatzert March, 1905.

During the Lewis and Clark Exposition of 1905, Bailey Gatzert made two excursions a day to Cascades Locks, in the Columbia Gorge, departing Portland at 8:30 a.m. and at 5:30 p.m., with a fare of $1.50, including meals served on board. A special tune was written for the steamer at this time, the "Bailey Gatzert March".

== 1907 reconstruction ==
In 1907, Bailey Gatzert was rebuilt with a new and longer hull. Engines which had previously been in the Telephone were installed into the Gatzert. The boat was converted to an oil-burner from a wood-burner.

In early April 1907 work was reportedly being rushed on the Bailey Gatzert. The length was increased 15 feet, with the beam staying practically the same. The freight house would be new, but the cabins of the older boat would be reused. The aft cabins on the hurricane deck were to be removed, and the area converted into a promenade J.H. Johnson designed the new Gatzert, and supervised its construction. Marcus Talbot was the manager of the Regulator Line at the time of the reconstruction.

On Saturday, August 24, 1907, the new Gatzert was launched from the ways of the Portland Shipbuilding Company at 11:30 a.m. The launch was to have occurred earlier, on the first of July, but it was delayed by labor disputes and materials shortages. The new Gatzert was expected to receive a license to carry 350 passengers, with that number rising to 625 for excursions.

The post-reconstruction trial trip of the vessel was taken on September 5, 1907, from Portland to the Columbia Gorge, with a number of dignitaries invited on board. Reportedly the rebuilt Gatzert had 50% more power than the original boat.

== Renewed competition with other steamers ==
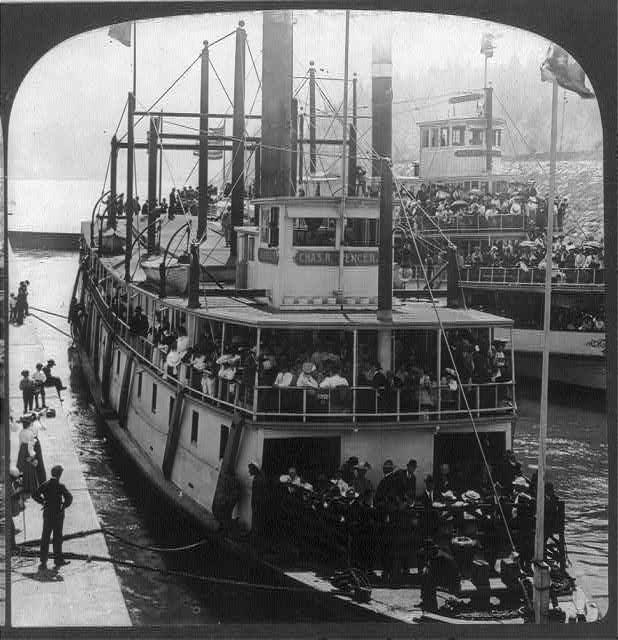
The steamers Charles R. Spencer, foreground, and Bailey Gatzert, background, both crowded with passengers, in the Cascades Locks, May 28, 1906 (from an old stereocard).

In the spring of 1908, both the Gatzert and its competitor, the Charles R. Spencer, began their summer operations on the same day, May 4, 1908, with talk of a pending rate war between the management of the two steamers, both of which had been recently rehabilitated and were reported to be in top mechanical shape. The steamers raced that day to Vancouver, Washington and then up the Columbia River Gorge to The Dalles. Preparations for the race had been going on quietly for week beforehand. The Spencer and the Gatzert were reported to have been at that time the fastest steamboats in the world.

Both steamers, with Fred Sherman in command of the Gatzert, and Ernest W. Spencer on the Spencer, left their docks on Portland at 7:00 a.m., passing downriver through the harbor at the double slow bell, with the Spencer leading. At 7:06 a.m. they passed through the Steel Bridge. To comply with a municipal ordinance restricting speed on the river, the boats took 13 minutes to reach the Portland Flour Mills, a distance they could cover in 4 minutes if moving at speed. At the flour mills, the race began in earnest. The Spencer held a lead of half a boat length down to Linnton, Oregon, where the Gatzert increased its speed and whistled a signal to the Spencer indicating its intent to pass.

But the Spencer held the right of way and turned closer to the Oregon shore when the boats reached the junction of the Willamette and the Columbia, increasing its lead to three boat lengths on the stretch into Vancouver, which Spencer reached first, covering the 17 mile distance from Portland to Vancouver in 65 minutes. Both boats embarked a few passengers at Vancouver, and the Gatzert, with a better position at the dock, was able to cast off first, and keep and maintain a lead of two boat-lengths to the Cascade Locks, transiting the locks before the Spencer.

Gatzert arrived at The Dalles at 2:32 p.m., with Spencer coming in 18 minutes later. Bailey Gatzert departed The Dalles at 2:50 p.m., even before the Spencer had arrived, returning to Portland, where the steamer tied up at 8:05 p.m., making the total running time for the round trip as 13 hours and 5 minutes. No freight was carried on either boat.

In May 1908, both the Regulator Line and its competitor, the independent steamer Charles R. Spencer, cut their passenger ticket prices to $1 per person one-way from Portland to either Astoria or The Dalles. Previously the rates had been $1.50, and Capt. Ernest W. Spencer, master of the steamer Spencer, was willing to see the rate cut to 50 cents.

The Gatzert was rebuilt in order to beat my boat, but I'll show them and the public that the Regulator Line and the whole Northern Pacific Railroad that owns it can't beat the Spencer. I've got some speed that I haven't used yet. And I've also got some fight in regard to cut rates. If those Gatzert fellows have started in for a scrap, I'm a man who likes to scrap. I've been in the steamboat business a long time and I think I've learned how.

== Proposed return to Astoria run ==
In mid-May 1908, there was talk that Bailey Gatzert might be placed on the run from Portland to Megler, Washington, where the Union Pacific Railroad had recently completed a big new dock to allow better river steamer connections, chiefly by the U.P.'s T.J.Potter, to be made between the narrow-gauge rail line running to Ilwaco and points on the Long Beach Peninsula. There was expected to be a sharp contest for the summer business on the Portland-Megler run. With automobile traffic little developed, and with no good roads to the resorts on the peninsula, then popular with Portland residents, steamer access was critical.

A new dock at Megler, possibly the largest on the Columbia, was built out far enough into the river that steamers could call there at any time without having to wait for a favorable high tide, as had been the case with the previous landing at Ilwaco. The Union Pacific however, which had previously cooperated with the Regulator line, permitting interchangeable tickets between the two companies, now refused to allow the Regulator boats, including the Gatzert, to use the Megler dock.

== High water on the Columbia ==
In June 1908, high water on the Columbia, reaching 37.1 feet above low water on June 18, 1908, forced closure of the Cascades Locks and suspension, temporarily, of river steamer service to The Dalles.

== Call for an end to steamboat racing ==
On Monday, June 22, 1908, the Gatzert and Spencer, both under full steam, raced past the British ship Crown of India. The swell created by the steamers nearly caused the ship to break free from its moorings. Captain Gilbert of the Crown of India made a complaint to the port engineer, J.B.C. Lockwood, who said that measures would have to be taken to prevent steamboat racing, as it was only a matter of time until a ship or the dry dock would be damaged. Gilbert's complaint was discussed at a special meeting of the Port of Portland held on the afternoon of Thursday, June 25, 1908.

On July 1, 1908, five steamers, Bailey Gatzert, Charles R. Spencer, Dalles City, Joseph Kellogg, and Capital City all departed Portland at 7:00 a.m., and nearly collided as they tried to pass through the draw of the Burnside Bridge.

On July 4, 1908, all steamers operating out of Portland were crowded to their limit. The full legal limit of 625 persons boarded Bailey Gatzert, after which customs officials ordered the gang planks drawn in, leaving on the dock over 1,000 who had wanted to board.

== Accidents and casualties ==
At 12:40 a.m. on Wednesday, October 30, 1895, in very dense fog, Bailey Gatzert collided with T.J. Potter, just downriver from Kalama, Washington, near Coffin Rock. There were no deaths. Damage to the Gatzert was $200, and damage to the Potter was $50.

On December 29, 1897, Bailey Gatzert was approaching Portland from Astoria and passing through the draw of the swinging railroad bridge. With 60 passengers on board, the steamer blew the whistle signal to open the bridge, and when the draw swung open, the vessel proceeded through on the east side of the bridge pier. Before the steamer was halfway through, the drawbridge swung back, smashing into the vessel's superstructure and jamming the steamer up against the bridge. It was late in the evening, and except for the crew, everyone on board was asleep. The bridge was opened again, and the steamer was able to proceed. Although some cabins were crushed, there were no fatalities and only two people were hurt, neither of them seriously. At the time, Bailey Gatzert was valued at $110,000.

Early in the morning of July 5, 1900, a large fire consumed about one-half of the business district in Rainier, Oregon. The Bailey Gatzert arrived at the town during the fire, and turned the steamer's firehose on the water front area, which was credited with saving the dock, warehouses, and other buildings in that vicinity.

On Friday, June 26, 1903, the cook of the Bailey Gatzert, a Chinese-American, was reported to have slipped from the gangplank of the steamer while docked at Portland, fell into the river, and drowned, within sight of 50 persons.

On November 1, 1907, at about 10:15 a.m. en route to The Dalles, at about Washougal, Washington, the Gatzert struck the upper end of Ough Reef, breaking some of the hull planking. The Gatzert was beached, a temporary patch put on the hole, and then returned to Portland, where the vessel was hauled out into drydock for repairs. No one was injured, there was no damage to the cargo, and the estimated cost of repair was $400. Steamboat inspectors conducted an investigation on November 4, 1907, and found that the pilot on watch, J.C. Hastings was at fault, suspending his license for 30 days for negligence and unskillfulness. On recovery of his license, Captain Hastings was assigned to be senior deck officer on the Regulator Line's chartered freight carrying steamer, Weown, then running under Capt. W.P. Short.

On November 6, 1907, at 8:00 a.m. in foggy conditions on the Willamette River, Bailey Gatzert collided with the dredge Portland, which was then at work on the river. There was no loss of life. The dredge was sunk, with an estimated damage of $10,000. A hole was torn in the bow of the Bailey Gatzert just above the water line. Damage to the steamer was estimated at $1,000. The Steamboat Inspection Service conducted an investigation from November 8, to December 3, which exonerated the master of the Gatzert from all blame.

== Last years on the Columbia River ==
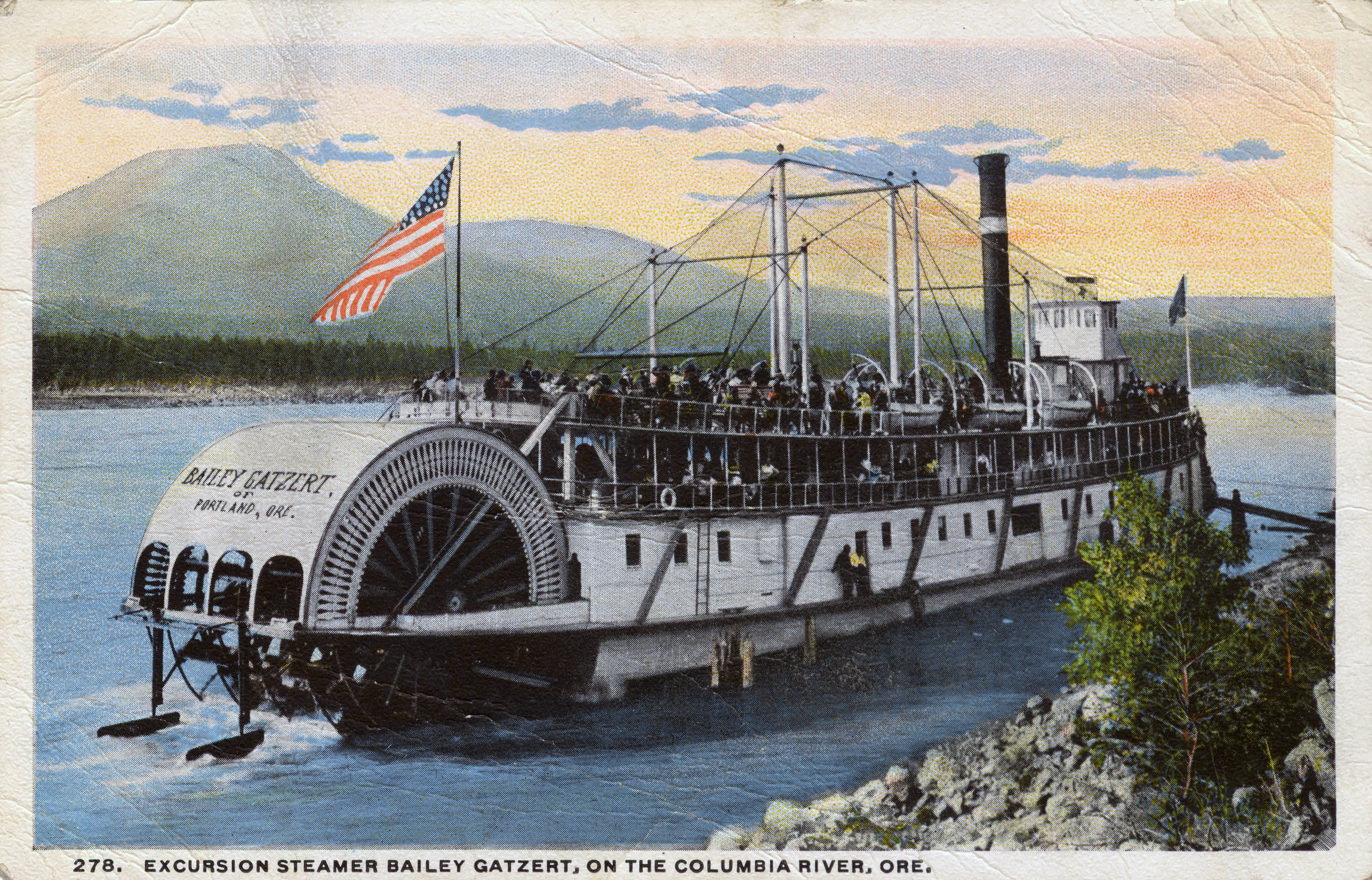
Postcard showing Bailey Gatzert at a landing on the Columbia River.

The decade beginning in 1911 was the last of the great steamboat era on the Columbia River. During this time, Bailey Gatzert ran mostly on excursions up the Columbia Gorge through the Cascade Locks and to The Dalles, as part of The Dalles, Portland and Astoria Navigation Company, also known as the Regulator Line. The Regulator Line was controlled by the Spokane, Portland and Seattle Railway, which was also known as the North Bank road.

In January 1911, Bailey Gatzert was out of operation for the winter.

In April 1911, a competitor of the Regulator Line, the Open River Transportation Company, running the sternwheeler J.N. Teal, cut its fare from Portland to The Dalles from $1.00 to 50 cents. In response, the Regulator Line stated that it would match superior service and speed, and moved to a faster schedule with its two boats, Gatzert and Dalles City.

By the summer of 1915, the major part of the passenger steamer service out of Portland was being provided by only four vessels: the Georgiana to Astoria, Bailey Gatzert on excursions to Columbia River Gorge, Grahamona to Oregon City, and, to St. Helens via Willamette Slough, the smaller propeller-driven steamer America

On the night of May 17, 1917, Bailey Gatzert, which had been out of service for some time, returned to the Portland-The Dalles Route. On June 20, 1917, when high water forced the closing of the Cascade Locks, the Gatzert, under veteran Captain Archie Geer (1859–1919), ran through the rapids with 125 passengers on board. This was the first time that passengers had been carried through the Cascades Rapids and the first time that the rapids had been run by any steamboat since June 26, 1893, when the D.S. Baker was brought through. The river was then at 32.1 feet above low water, the highest it had apparently ever been during a steamboat run. The lowest water over the rapids during a steamboat run, 13.2 feet, had been on June 15, 1889, when Wasco had been taken over by Capt. James W. Troup.

In June 1917, Bailey Gatzert was the only steamer making regular runs from Portland to The Dalles, and these runs were subject to interruption when high water closed the Cascades Locks.

=== Sympathy strike ===
On August 6, 1917, the Marine Transport Workers Industrial Union No. 700, which was affiliated with the Industrial Workers of the World, called for a strike of deckhands on steamers operating on the Columbia and Willamette Rivers, to show sympathy for lumber worker strikes then ongoing at mills and logging camps. Most of the deckhands of five steamers went out on strike. Of the eight deckhands on Bailey Gatzert, three or four non-union hands remained on duty.

=== Removed from service ===
At the end of December, 1917, the Gatzert was taken out of service for the winter. On February 26, 1918, the Regulator Line, owners of the Bailey Gatzert, announced through Drake C. O'Reilly, head of the corporation, that it would not be resuming service from Portland to The Dalles. The company cited increased labor costs, and the increased price of fuel oil, which had risen from 75 cents to $1.65 per barrel, as causes of its decision, which idled the steamers Gatzert and Dalles City, with the company having no plans for either vessel. This left the steamer Tahoma, under the People's Line, running from Portland to The Dalles three times a week.

== Return to Puget Sound ==
On April 10, 1918, the Gatzert was purchased by a shipping line known as The Navy Yard Route, an affiliate of the dominant Puget Sound Navigation Company, and placed on the run between Seattle and Bremerton, Washington. Well-known Seattle businessman Joshua Green (1869–1975) acted as the Navy Yard's representative in the sale. There was a heavy demand for passenger ferry service due to wartime activity at the navy yards at Bremerton.

En route to Seattle, Bailey Gatzert arrived at Astoria on April 14, 1918, at 1:00 a.m. Bailey Gatzert departed across the Columbia Bar at 6:40 a.m. on April 17, 1918, bound for Puget Sound in the tow of the steam tug Wallula.

In 1920, Bailey Gatzert was "sponsoned out" (widened), to work as an automobile ferry, and an automobile elevator was installed on the main deck forward of the pilot house. At this time, the captain of the vessel was Harry Anderson, later to be in charge of the Washington State Ferries system.

In November 1921, Bailey Gatzert was replaced on the Bremerton route by the converted steam ferry City of Bremerton (ex Whatcom ex Majestic). The four-toned whistle was also transferred to the City of Bremerton.

In 1923 the Gatzert's boiler was retubed. According to one source, Bailey Gatzert's last active service was in the summer of 1923, substituting for City of Bremerton while that ferry was being overhauled. According to another source, Bailey Gatzert was still in occasional use in October 1925. The boat's hull was then 194 feet long, and the overall length of the vessel was 225 feet. The stern-wheel was then 22 feet in diameter and it made 20 revolutions in a minute.

== Disposition ==
According to one source, the machinery in the Gatzert was stripped out in 1926 Another, contemporary, source, reports that the boat was floating at its moorings in May 1929, stripped of machinery and out of use.

In 1930, the hulk of the steamer was sold to the Lake Union Drydock and Machine Works, of Seattle, which built a four-story structure on the old hull, which was still sound, and used the vessel as a floating shipway and machine shop in Lake Union.

== Modern memory ==
The Gatzert's chime whistle and its name plate were preserved in the collections of the Museum of History and Industry, in Seattle, Washington.

The design of the Bailey Gatzert inspired several other sternwheelers, including the 1897 Arrow Lakes, British Columbia sternwheeler Rossland and, much later, the M/V Columbia Gorge, launched at Hood River, Oregon in 1983. Rossland, said to have been one of the most elegant steamboats ever built, was designed by Captain James W. Troup, the same man who had been on board Bailey Gatzert when it was launched in 1890.

In 1996, the Bailey Gatzert was honored by being depicted on a U.S. postage stamp. In 2013, the Gorge Winds Concert Band recorded "The Bailey Gatzert March", in an arrangement by Steve Hodges.
