= La Center (sternwheeler) =

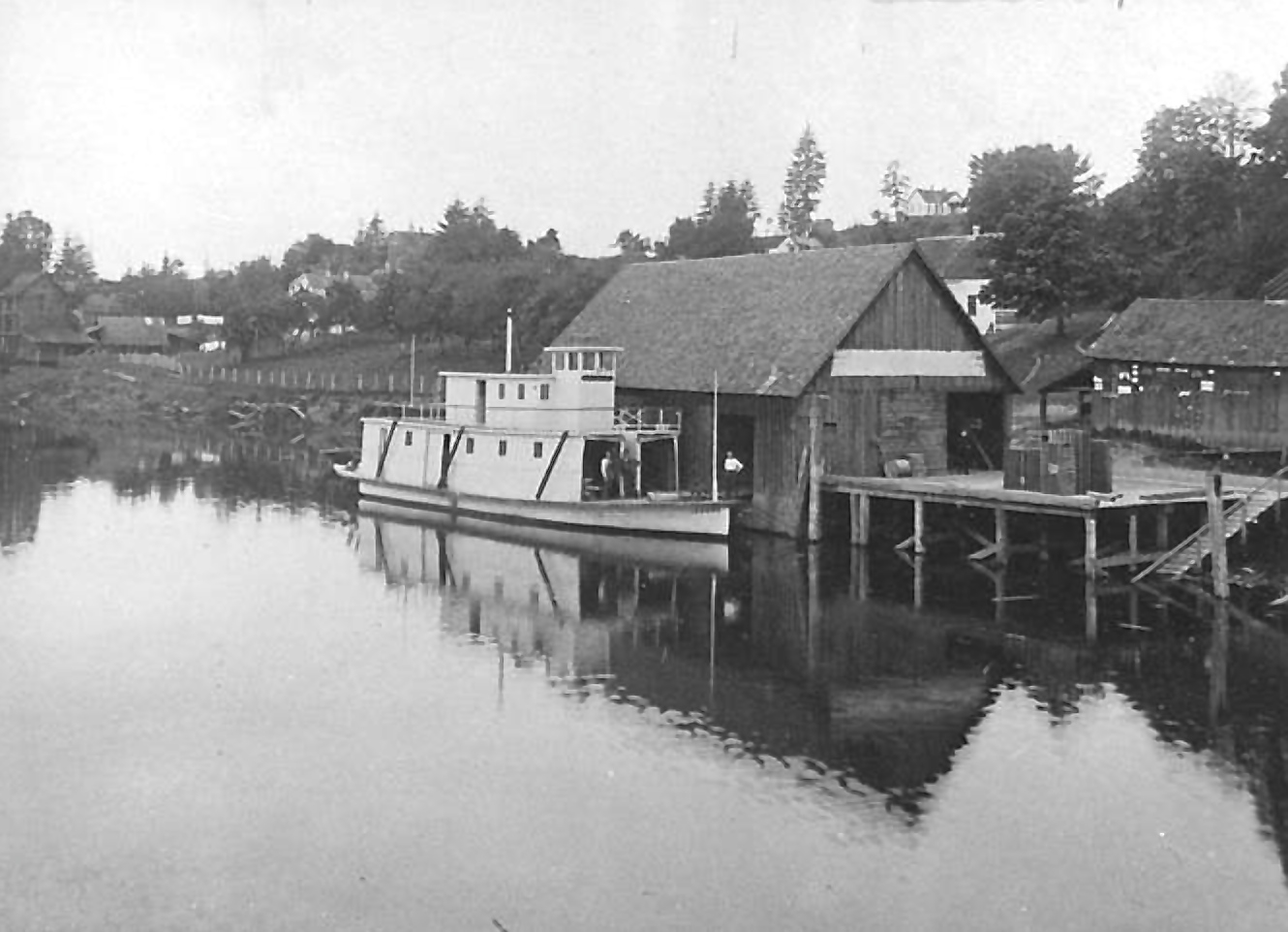
- La Center at Timmens Landing, (La Center, Washington, moored by freight warehouse, circa 1920.

History
- Name: La Center
- Owner: Brothers & Moe 1912-1916); Arthur C Heston (1916- )
- Route: Lewis, Lake, lower Columbia and lower Willamette rivers
- In service: 1912
- Out of service: 1931
- Identification: U.S. #209642
- Fate: Abandoned.

General characteristics
- Type: inland all-purpose
- Length: 65 ft (19.81 m) measured over hull
- Beam: 16 ft (4.88 m) exclusive of guards
- Draft: 12 in (304.8 mm)
- Depth: 3.1 ft (0.94 m) depth of hold
- Installed power: originally a gasoline engine, later replaced with twin steam engines, horizontally mounted, cylinder bore 5.5 in (139.7 mm) and stroke of 2.5 ft (0.76 m).
- Propulsion: sternwheel
- Capacity: 45 tons of freight

La Center was a small stern-wheel steamboat that operated from 1912 to 1931, mostly on the Lewis and Lake rivers in southwest Washington, on a route to and from Portland, Oregon along the lower Columbia and lower Willamette rivers.

La Center was small compared to other sternwheelers of the Columbia River. However, despite a number of accidents, including collisions and groundings, La Center earned a reputation as providing dependable transport for the Lewis River country to the Portland market.

La Center was somewhat unusual in that it was originally fitted with a gasoline engine, and then about a year after construction, the gasoline engine was replaced with second-hand steam engines.

== Construction ==
La Center was built at La Center, Washington for the Brothers & Moe concern, comprising Uriah Sidney Brothers, E.C. Brothers, and Peter I. Moe.

== Dimensions ==
La Center was 65 ft (19.81 m) long, exclusive of the extension of the main deck over the stern, called the fantail, on which the stern-wheel was mounted. The vessel had a beam of 16 ft (4.88 m) exclusive of the protective timbers along the top outside edge of the hull called guards, The depth of hold was 3.1 ft (0.94 m).

La Center had a draft of 12 in (304.8 mm) when loaded with its maximum capacity of 45 tons of freight.

The overall size of the vessel was 67 gross tons (a measure of volume and not weight) and 64 registered tons.

The official merchant vessel registry number was 209642.

== Machinery ==
La Center was driven by a sternwheel. La Center was originally powered with gasoline engines. In June 1913, La Center was converted to steam power. These were two twin steam engines, horizontally mounted, with cylinder bores of 5.5 in (139.7 mm) and stroke of 2.5 ft (0.76 m).

The gasoline engines from La Center were fitted into the Lewis River Navigation Company's sternwheeler Wallula (ex Uncle Sam). In turn, the steam engines installed into La Center came also from the Uncle Sam.

The Morning Oregonian described Uncle Sam as having "caused more comment than the arrival of any other river vessel which has come to Portland on account of her peculiar construction, which is not describable in nautical terms." Uncle Sam, which had been built at Corvallis, Oregon, had been granted a special permit to make a trial trip downriver to Portland to be inspected to receive a license to enter into the steamboat business.

However, steamboat inspectors Edwards and Fuller refused to grant Uncle Sam a certificate. The owners of Uncle Sam then reached an agreement with the owners of La Center to trade machinery, with La Center’s gasoline engine going to Uncle Sam, and Uncle Sam’s boiler, engines, and other gear going to La Center.

== Operations ==
Timmens Landing (La Center, WA), circa 1919. La Center is larger steamer on right, Etna appears to be the smaller steamer on the left.

La Center made its trial trip in Portland harbor on February 22, 1912, with Captain Brothers in command.

In July 1912, the Lewis River Transportation Company sold its interests in the east fork of the Lewis river, consisting of the small sternwheeler Spellei, a barge, and five acres of land, to Uriah S. Brothers, E.C. Brothers, and Peter Moe, who were at that time operating the newly built La Center from a dock at the foot of Washington Street in Portland, Oregon, to La Center, Washington.

According to another source, Uriah S. and E.C. Brothers, and Peter Moe reached an agreement with the Lewis River Transportation Company, who owned the launch Charm, whereby La Center would carry freight and Charm would carry passengers on the Lewis River route.

The Lewis River was a profitable route before the development of other means of transportation.

=== Collision with David Campbell ===
On May 24, 1913, La Center was taken to Joseph Supple's shipyard on the east side of Portland to have repairs done on its right-side guard and to have its gasoline engines shifted into position, the work being necessary to address the damage to La Center caused by the new fireboat David Campbell, when the Campbell collided with La Center when La Center was docked at the foot of Washington Street.

=== Proposed sale ===
On October 5, 1913, a steamboat line matching the description of La Center was offered for sale through T.W. Nordby, with an address at the Couch Building in Portland. According to this advertisement, the line had one steamer, two warehouses, five acres of ground, and earned $500 per month net of expenses. The asking price was $7,000.

=== Collision with Shaver ===
On the night of Friday, October 24, 1913, La Center collided with the sternwheeler Shaver on the Willamette River off St. Johns. La Center was running under the command of Captain Peter I. Moe. Shaver was being operated by Captain Berry.

Shaver, at 368 gross tons was a much larger vessel than La Center. According to a report in the Morning Oregonian, damages to shipments of prunes. beef, hogs and "general stuff" being carried on board La Center exceeded $1,000.

The initial news report of the accident was that it was caused by a confusion of whistle signals. Shaver had departed Portland soon after 11:00 p.m. headed downstream. La Center was coming upstream from the Lewis River. The towboat Alarm was coming upriver at the same time as La Center, with a log raft.

Shaver gave two whistle signals to Alarm, which Captain Brothers, on La Center, interpreted as being intended for La Center. Captain Brothers changed course, crossing Shaver’s bow, which crashed into the side of La Center, running through the guard timbers and about four feet into La Center’s hull.

La Center was beached near the St. Johns Shipbuilding Company. No one was injured in the collision.

On Monday, October 27, 1913, La Center was hauled out of the river at St. Johns for repairs. Captain Berry of Shaver had by then filed a report of the incident with U.S. steamboat inspectors Edwards and Fuller.

=== Bootlegging allegations ===
On November 7, 1914, Capt. Peter I. Moe, of La Center, was required to appear before customs officials in Portland, Oregon to explain allegations against him that bootlegging activity was being conducted in the town of La Center from a building on the waterfront.

Although this was before national Prohibition in the United States, the town of La Center had recently voted go "dry", that is, to outlaw liquor sales within the city limits. Moe, believing the report was directed at him, denied the allegations.

Moe was quoted in the Morning Oregonian as having said:

I have been told by the City Attorney and Marshal that they know nothing about any confiscation or collection of evidence. I want to say that the report is false. There has not been any liquor carried on the steamer La Center since the town of La Center went ‘dry’.

=== Ice problems 1914 ===
On December 19, 1914, La Center was reported to be frozen up on the Lewis River. The Lewis and Lake rivers were frozen over, and navigation from Portland to points on these rivers was suspended.

On January 25, 1915, ice in the Columbia river prevented La Center from making its usual trip to Portland.

=== Excursion operations in 1915 ===
On May 12, 1915, the La Center baseball team chartered La Center to go to St. Helens to pay a game against the St. Helens team. St. Helens won, 11–0.

Later that year, the Portland Motorboat Club, and their associated boats, were scheduled to take a three-day trip starting Saturday, July 3, 1915, from Portland down the Willamette and Columbia rivers to Paradise Point on the east fork of the Lewis River. La Center was chartered to carry excursionists who could not get a place on one of the motor boats.

=== Ice problems in 1916 ===
Ice impeded La Center again in January 1916. The steamer was unable to reach the east fork of the Lewis River, because of heavy ice in both the Columbia and the Lewis Rivers.

Freight for the town of La Center was being brought to Ridgefield, Washington by rail, and then carried overland by teams, wagons, and sleds. The steamer La Center could not go back on the run until the weather improved. This was reported to have been the first time in about four years that winter weather had tied up navigation on the Lewis River.

== Sale to Arthur C. Heston ==
In early April 1916, Uriah S. and E.C. Brothers sold their interest in La Center to Arthur C. Heston, who had been running the steamer before the sale. The steamer was then described as "a small packet plying daily between La Center and other Lewis River points and Portland.

== Low water 1916 ==
In the fall of 1916, the water in the Lewis and Lake rivers fell so low that boats risked grounding on sandbars, and log raft traffic was impeded. Rains in early November raised the river levels so that La Center could run again on its usual route on the east fork. La Center was also operating at the same time between Portland and Ridgefield, Washington on the Lake River, handling the freight work of the steamer Mimare which was then under reconstruction.

== Washed inland by flood ==
On December 19, 1917, it was reported that La Center had been carried ashore during a flood and grounded at Lamb's Landing, about three miles south of Woodland, Washington. The location of the grounding was a pasture between the east and the north forks of the Lewis River. La Center was still ashore on January 5, 1918. The boat was located high and dry 300 feet from the river after the flood receded.

By January 17, 1918, La Center had been placed back in the river, by having been jacked up and skids being placed under the hull.

== Return to Lewis River Transportation Company ==
In December 1918, La Center, then operating under Capt. Arthur C. Heston, was returned to the control of the Lewis River Transportation Company, of which Heston was secretary.

The company was then operating from the Ash Street dock in Portland. La Center was then carrying only freight.

Lewis River Transportation Company was owned and run by members of the Weir family, including, originally, Capt. William G. Weir (1834-1902), his son, Cassius "Cash" Weir (c1860-1942), and Cash's son, Earl Weir.

The Weirs owned a number of boats that operated on the Lewis River.

== Capsized in wind storm ==
On December 1, 1921, La Center capsized in a wind storm, drowning most of a herd of cattle that were then being transported by the steamer.

La Center had been proceeding from Kelso, Washington to the Portland stockyards with 40 head of cattle on board, when the steamer capsized downstream from Columbia City, Oregon, near Deer Island Of the herd, all but file head were drowned. the sternwheeler Metlako rescued the crew of La Center.

On Wednesday December 14, 1921, La Center was returned to service, having been raised the week before without much difficulty. La Center was then running on a tri-weekly route between La Center, Ridgefield, and Portland and way points on the Lewis, Lake, Columbia and Willamette rivers.

== Operation by W.H. Hembree ==
In 1925, La Center was operated by W.H. Hembree.

== Disposition ==
La Center was abandoned in 1931.
