= Charles R. Spencer =

Steamboat built in 1901

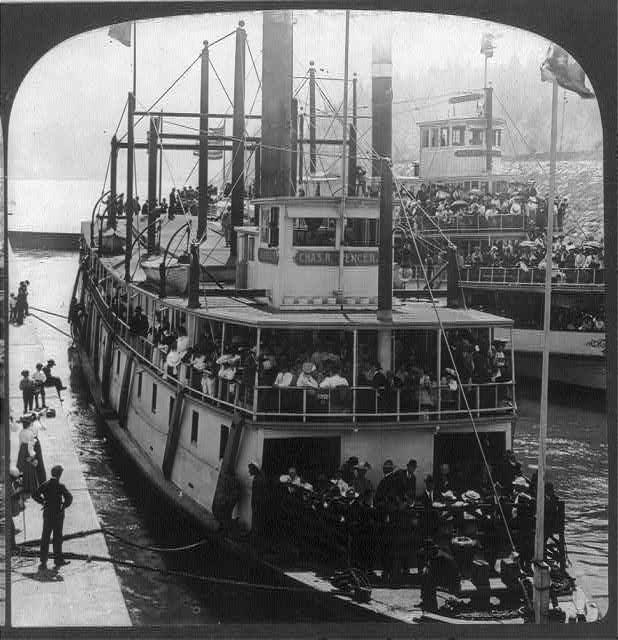
- Charles R. Spencer

History
- Name: Charles R. Spencer
- Port of registry: US # 127574
- Route: Columbia River
- Builder: Capt. E.W. Spencer, Portland, Oregon
- In service: 1901
- Notes: Renamed Monarch in 1911.

General characteristics
- Type: inland steamboat, shallow-draft express passenger
- Tonnage: 598 gross tons; 474 or 409 net tons
- Length: 184 ft (56 m)
- Beam: 21 ft (6 m)
- Depth: 6.0 ft (2 m) depth of hold.
- Installed power: twin steam engines, horizontally mounted, 20" bore by 96" stroke, 26.6 nhp
- Propulsion: sternwheel
- Speed: About 19 miles per hour (maximum)
- Notes: Later known as Monarch

Charles R. Spencer (generally called the Spencer) was a steamboat built in 1901 to run on the Willamette and Columbia rivers from Portland, to The Dalles, Oregon. This vessel was described as an "elegant passenger boat". After 1911 this vessel was rebuilt and renamed Monarch.

== Characteristics ==
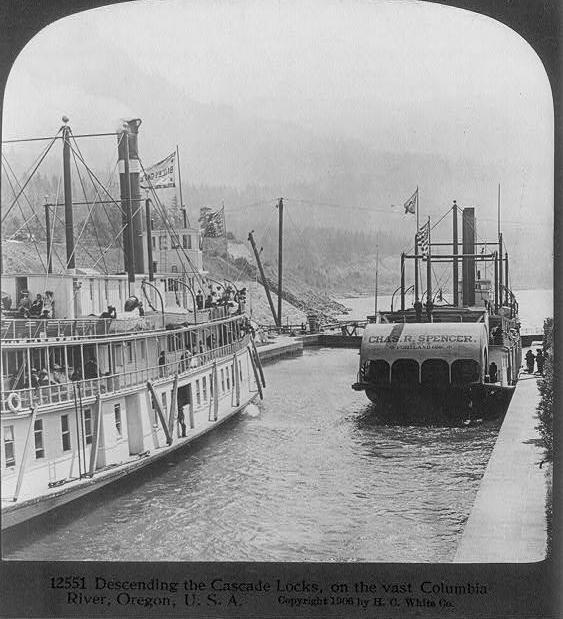
Charles R. Spencer and Bailey Gatzert descending Cascade Locks circa 1906.

The Spencer was considered one of the elite vessels of its time. It had a bright red smokestack and a steam whistle so loud that it was said to have "made rotten piles totter."

== Operations ==
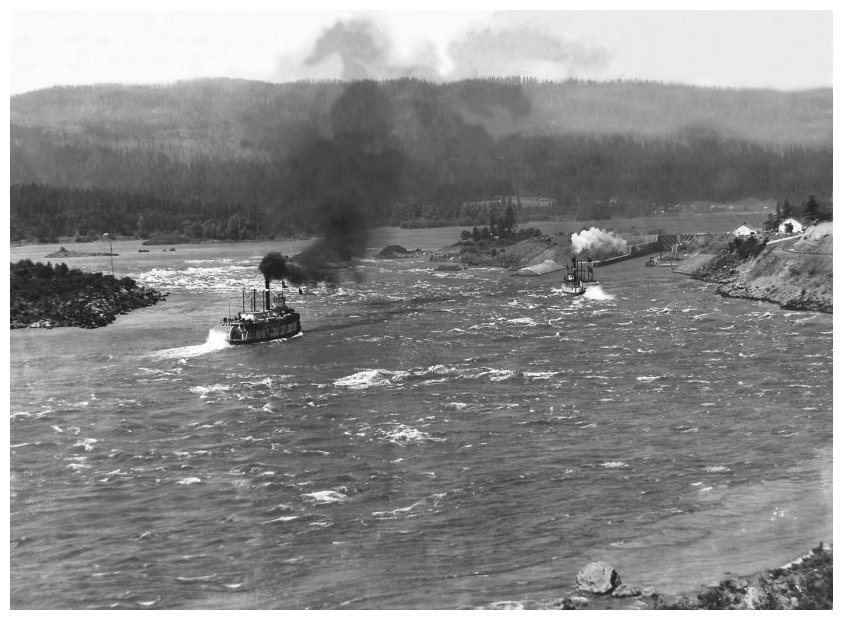
Bailey Gatzert (on left) and Charles R. Spencer (on right), eastbound on the Columbia River, approaching Cascades Locks.

E.W. Spencer operated Spencer as an independent enterprise. Although steamboat racing was technically illegal, operators of steamboats often tried to "do their best" when a rival steamboat was on the river. Spencer as a prestige boat was frequently raced against other top vessels of the day, including Bailey Gatzert and T.J. Potter. Races against the Bailey Gatzert happened almost every day when the two vessels ran against each other on the Portland-The Dalles route. It has been reported that at one time in 1906, when Spencer was running behind Bailey Gatzert, the captain of Spencer made up the time by running the Cascades Rapids (an extremely risky undertaking) while Bailey Gatzert was moving through the Cascade Locks .

On July 12, 1904, Spencer was racing the Oregon Railway and Navigation Company's Dalles City on the Columbia about 15 miles upstream from Hood River. The winds were high, and blowing east against the steamers as they moved downstream, and the waves were choppy. The Spencer's main steam pipe broke, which forced the pilot to steer for the river bank to beach the vessel. Spencer hit rocks 25 feet from shore, and sank. There were no casualties among those aboard. Spencer was later refloated and repaired. In 1905, Captain Spencer continued to be in sharp competition for the passenger traffic on the routes from Portland to Astoria and to The Dalles. His competitors included the Oregon Railway and Navigation Company, and also Captain U.B. Scott, owner of Telephone, possibly the fastest vessel on the river.

== Collision with Dalles City ==
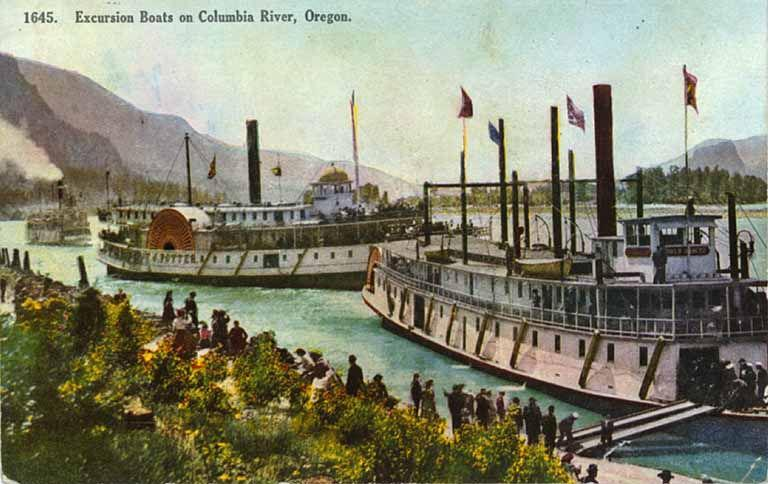
This photograph is from an old colorized postcard. The view is towards the west, and shows T.J. Potter pulling away from a landing, probably just before entering the Cascade Locks. Another steamer, a sternwheeler, is in the foreground, this is possibly the Charles Spencer. Coming up to the landing from the west another steamer can be seen, which from the vessel's apparent configuration and the white collar on her funnel, appears to be the Bailey Gatzert. The large crowds on all the steamers are readily visible; this is an excellent depiction of the high point of steamboat operations on the river.

On May 31, 1905, a collision during one of these races between Dalles City and the Spencer generated substantial litigation. Dalles City was struck by the Charles R. Spencer while the Spencer was trying to overtake Dalles City. As a result, Dalles City suffered serious and disabling mechanical damage. The opinion of the court describes the fierce commercial competition which was the occasion for the race on that date:

The boats were plying between Portland and The Dalles, and belonged to opposition lines which were aggressively competing for the passenger business of the two terminal cities and intermediate points along the Willamette and Columbia rivers. The first to arrive at any place along the route where passengers were received secured the larger part of the business, and, both boats being scheduled to leave Portland at the same hour, speed became an important consideration. The Charles R. Spencer was the larger, more powerful, and swifter craft, and, with equal opportunity, could outstrip her rival. Upon the morning in question, they left the Portland clocks at about 7 o'clock, the Dalles City passing out through the drawbridges a few hundred feet ahead of the Charles R. Spencer. A struggle at once began, the Charles R. Spencer seeking by her superior speed to pass her competitor, and the Dalles City to maintain the advantage that she had secured in making the start. The Dalles City was apparently under a full head of Steam, and moved at the rate of 17 or 18 miles an hour. The Charles R. Spencer, necessarily following practically the same course, pushed close up in her wake, and two or three times essayed to pass, but without avail. Here arises the first substantial conflict in the testimony. Upon behalf of the Charles R. Spencer it is charged that her failures to pass were due to the "jockeying" maneuvers of the Dalles City in swinging across her course from time to time, and thus crowding her out.

In November 1905, the Spencer, Dalles City, and Telephone all cast off lines at once in Portland, and headed downriver for Astoria. As each vessel raced down the Willamette at high speed, they threw up a wake which rocked and damaged large ships moored alongside piers, which resulted in the captains of the steamboats each being fined $50, a considerable sum for the time.

== Freight work ==
In September 1906, Spencer began transporting wheat from inland Oregon and Washington in cooperation with the Open River Navigation Company. The boats of the Open River company would pick up the wheat on points on the river above Celilo, bring the wheat down to Celilo, where it would be loaded on the portage railway that ran along the river to a point above the Dalles, where the wheat would be loaded onto the Spencer to be brought down to tidewater at Portland, transiting the Cascade Locks en route. Another source states that Spencer was taken over by the Open River company.

== Later career ==
The rising automobile business took away Spencer's main routes, and in 1911 the vessel was rebuilt and renamed Monarch.

Spencer was transferred to California in 1914. One of Spencer's early captains was Edgar E. Bateman (1856–1949).
