= Libel (admiralty law) =

First pleading of the complainant

A libel, in admiralty law, is the first pleading of the complainant.

== Process ==
It is filed in the office of the clerk of the court to commence the action. It is in the form of a petition addressed to the judge of the court by name, setting forth the nature and facts of the claim and containing a prayer that process issue in the proper manner. If the action is against an individual, a citation will issue directing the person to appear and answer; if against a vessel, a writ issues to an officer of the court directing the officer to attach it, which is considered sufficient notice to the owners. The libel must be verified by the libellant, as the complainant is called, or the complainant's agent if the complainant is without the jurisdiction.

== Etymology ==
The term comes from the old French libel, libelle, libeau, corresponding to French: libelle, from Latin: libellus, diminutive of Latin: liber, book, inner bark of a tree. The name was borrowed from the Roman law where a pleading known as the libellus conventionis was employed to commence an action. The word libel continued to designate the first pleading in an action under the civil law. It corresponds to a complaint or declaration in other actions.
