= Portland Shipbuilding Company =

Defunct shipyard in Portland, Oregon, U.S.

Coordinates: 45.4776°N 122.6705°W

The Portland Shipbuilding Company was a shipyard in Portland, Oregon, United States. It was founded in the late 19th century and constructed paddle steamers during its early history. During World War II, the shipyard produced wooden barges for the U.S. Army and Navy. The company continued more limited operations following the war until its facilities were destroyed in a 1964 flood.

== History ==
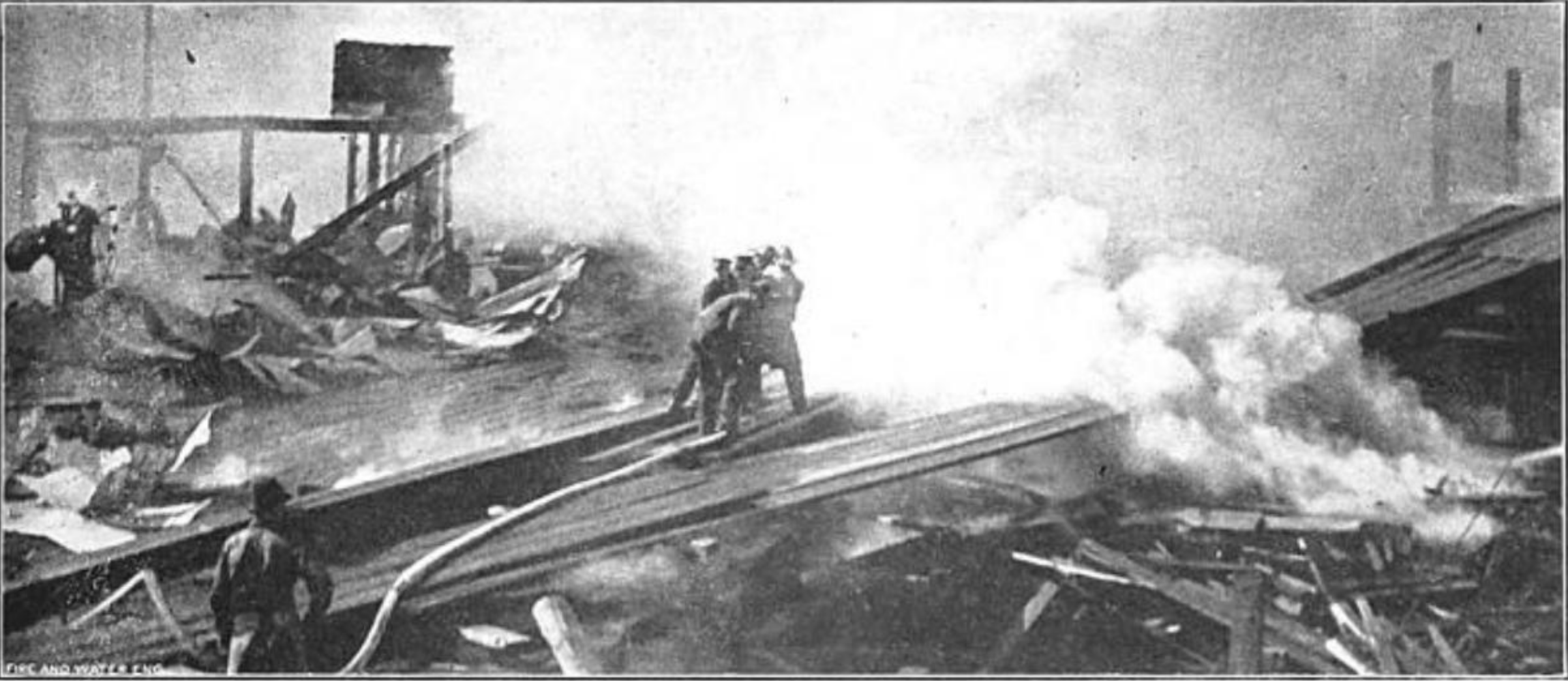
Firefighters combating a blaze at the shipyard in 1924

The Oregon Daily Journal records that the company was orgnized in 1898 by Charles M. Nelson, a shipbuilder originally from Norway. The company first appears in the Polk Directory for Portland, Oregon, in 1899/1900. Early directory entries list the shipyard as being located in an area north of the present-day Ross Island Bridge. The company moved to a site at the foot of SW Nebraska Street in 1918.

The Portland Shipbuilding Company constructed paddle steamers for much of its early history. In 1924, the shipyard suffered a fire that was caused by sparks from its blacksmith shop. The fire destroyed a barge and heavily damaged the sternwheeler Sarah Dixon, which were both in for repairs.

During World War II, the shipyard built several types of wooden barges for the U.S. Army and Navy. After the war, the company continued limited repair operations until the Christmas flood of 1964 destroyed much of its facilities. The City of Portland purchased the company's 7-acre (2.8 ha) site in February 1969 in order to expand Willamette Park, a public park immediately to the south.

== Notable vessels ==
=== Constructed ===
- Pomona (completed 1898)
- Jessie Harkins (completed 1903)
- Cowlitz (completed 1917)

=== Rebuilt ===
- Sarah Dixon (rebuilt 1906)
- Bailey Gatzert (rebuilt 1907)
