= Manzanillo, Panama =

Manzanillo, Panama may refer to

- Manzanillo Bay, a bay on the Atlantic coast of Panama, near the eastern entrance to the Panama Canal
- Manzanillo Island, a small island in that bay which made up Colón before its expansion following the demise of the Canal Zone
- Manzanillo International Terminal, a port terminal on that bay

See also:

- Manzanillo (disambiguation)
