= Manzanillo =

Manzanillo or manzanillo (Spanish for "little apple", literally) may refer to:

- Manzanillo, Colima, a city in Mexico
  - Manzanillo Municipality, Colima, the surrounding municipality
- Manzanillo, Cuba, a city in the province of Granma
- Manzanillo Port, a port in the province of Monte Cristi, Dominican Republic
- Manzanillo, Valladolid, a municipality in the province of Valladolid, Spain
- Manzanillo Bay, a bay on the Atlantic coast of Panama, near the eastern entrance to the Panama Canal
  - Manzanillo Island, a small island in that bay
  - Manzanillo International Terminal, a port terminal on that bay
- Manzanillo, Limón, a fishing village in the south-east of Costa Rica, on the Caribbean Sea coast
- Manzanillo (olive) (Olea europaea 'Manzanillo', also known as the "olive of Seville") the most common variety of Spanish olive, a medium-sized green to purple-black olive cultivar grown especially in and around Seville, Andalusia; also, the Manzanillo olive tree as a whole, rather than just its fruit; often misspelled Manzanilla
- Manzanillo (sternwheeler), a steamboat in the U.S. state of Oregon in the late 19th century

== See also ==
- Manzanilla (disambiguation)
