= Pamit =

Pamit may refer to:

- Dimiat, a variety of grape
- SS Pamit, a Greek cargo ship in service 1959-62
- Pamit Inc., a privately held corporation registered in Nova Scotia, Canada
- Pamit Cards, an online greeting card store.
- UN/LOCODE:PAMIT, a location code for Manzanillo International Terminal in Panama.

== Songs ==
- "Pamit”, a song by Tulus from her 2016 album, Monokrom
