= Sarah Dixon (sternwheeler) =

Steamboat operated on Oregon rivers

- Sarah Dixon (on right) and G.W. Shaver (on left), at Washington Street dock, Portland, Oregon, 1897.

History
- Name: Sarah Dixon
- Owner: People’s Freighting Co.1892-1895; Shaver Transportation Co.(1895–1934)
- Operator: Open River Transportation Co. (1908 charter)
- Route: Columbia and lower Willamette rivers.
- Builder: Johnson & Olsen (1892 hull), Charles Bureau (1892 cabins); Portland Shipbuilding Co. (1906 reconstruction)
- Cost: $35,000 or $45,000
- Launched: February 3, 1892
- Maiden voyage: April 3, 1892
- In service: 1892
- Out of service: 1934
- Identification: US registry #116470 (1894-1906); #203009 (1906-1934)
- Fate: Converted to floating machine shop in 1934, later abandoned circa 1950.

General characteristics
- Type: inland multiple use
- Tonnage: 369 gt; 278 rt (1892–1906); 368 gt; 334 rt (1906–1934)
- Length: 145 ft (44 m) (1892–1906); 161 ft (49 m) (1906–1934)
- Beam: 26 ft (8 m) (1892–1906); 29.5 ft (9 m) (1906–1934)
- Draft: 26 ft (8 m) (1892–1906)
- Depth: 6.5 ft (2 m) (1892–1906); 7.2 ft (2 m) (1906–1934)
- Installed power: twin horizontally mounted high-pressure single-cylinder steam engines. 400 horsepower (1906)
- Propulsion: sternwheel
- Speed: 17 to 18 miles per hour (estimated maximum)
- Capacity: 200 passengers officially, carried as many as 300 on occasion.
- Crew: 8 to 12 or more

Sarah Dixon was a wooden sternwheel-driven steamboat operated by the Shaver Transportation Company on the Columbia and lower Willamette rivers from 1892 to 1926. Originally Sarah Dixon was built as a mixed use passenger and freight vessel, and was considered a prestige vessel for the time.

Later, in 1906, Sarah Dixon was converted to become primarily a towing vessel. Sarah Dixon sustained a serious explosion in 1912, which killed the captain and the first mate. The steamboat was reconstructed, and served until 1926 when it was destroyed by fire while hauled out on a shipway for an additional reconstruction.

After the 1926 reconstruction, Sarah Dixon remained in service, primarily as a towing and freighting vessel, until 1934, when its machinery was removed and the vessel was converted to a floating machine shop.

The unpowered Sarah Dixon functioned in this capacity until 1949, when its wooden hull was becoming too weak to be relied upon. Sometime in 1950 or later, it was taken from Portland up the Columbia River to Paterson, Washington, where it eventually sank on its own.

== Design and construction ==
Sarah Dixon was built in 1892 at Portland, Oregon for the People's Freighting Company, which in 1895 was incorporated as the Shaver Transportation Company. G.W. Evans (b.1856) supervised construction.

As built, the dimensions of the vessel were 145 feet (44 m) long, 26-foot (7.9 m) beam, 6.5-foot (2.0 m) depth of hold, 369 gross and 278 registered tons. The hull was built by Johnson & Olsen at Smith's mill.

The cabins were built by Capt. Charles Bureau (1840-1936) The texas and the pilot house were reported to resemble those of the fast steamer Telephone.

The vessel cost about $35,000 to construct. Another report gives the cost to complete the steamer as $45,000.

The steamboat was named after Sarah Dixon Shaver (1832–1910) wife of George Washington Shaver (1832–1900), the founder of a business which eventually became Shaver Transportation Company.

When built, Sarah Dixon was expected to be one of the finest vessels on the river. The paint work was done by Loomis Paint Company, the furniture was supplied by the Oregon Furniture Company, and the carpets were furnished by Meier & Frank.

Sarah Dixon was reported to have a large cargo capacity and to have been licensed, in 1892, to carry 200 passengers.

== Engineering ==
The stern-wheel was driven by twin high-pressure single-cylinder steam engines manufactured by Iowa Iron Works of Dubuque, Iowa. The cylinder of each engine had a bore of 14 inches (360 mm) diameter and stroke of 84 inches (2,100 mm).

The boiler was built by James Monk, a Portland boilermaker. It was built from steel one-half inch thick and could carry 165 pounds pressure of steam.

As built, Sarah Dixon burned wood to heat its boiler, and relied on wood yards along its route to furnish the fuel. During floods, such as occurred in June 1894, it was difficult to get wood from the wood yards, which hampered the operation of the Sarah Dixon.

The electric light plant was based on the Crouch (a local inventor) system, and was installed by M.G. Morgan. Frank Turner installed the steam steering mechanism.

The official steamboat registry number of the vessel as built was 116470.

== Launch ==
Sarah Dixon was launched at 10:30 a.m. on Wednesday, February 3, 1892, at Portland. At the time of the launch, the boat was expected to be ready to enter into service on March 1, 1892. By February 26, however, the date of anticipated completion had been rolled back to March 15.

The vessel was equipped with electric lighting (then a novel feature on Columbia river boats), and steam-powered steering gear and hoisting machinery. The passenger accommodations were considered to be superior. Overall, Sarah Dixon when it was built was considered to be one of the more prestigious vessels to operate on the Columbia river system.

In 1892 it was reported that the steamer once worked up, could be expected to make 17 to 18 miles per hour.

== Operations ==
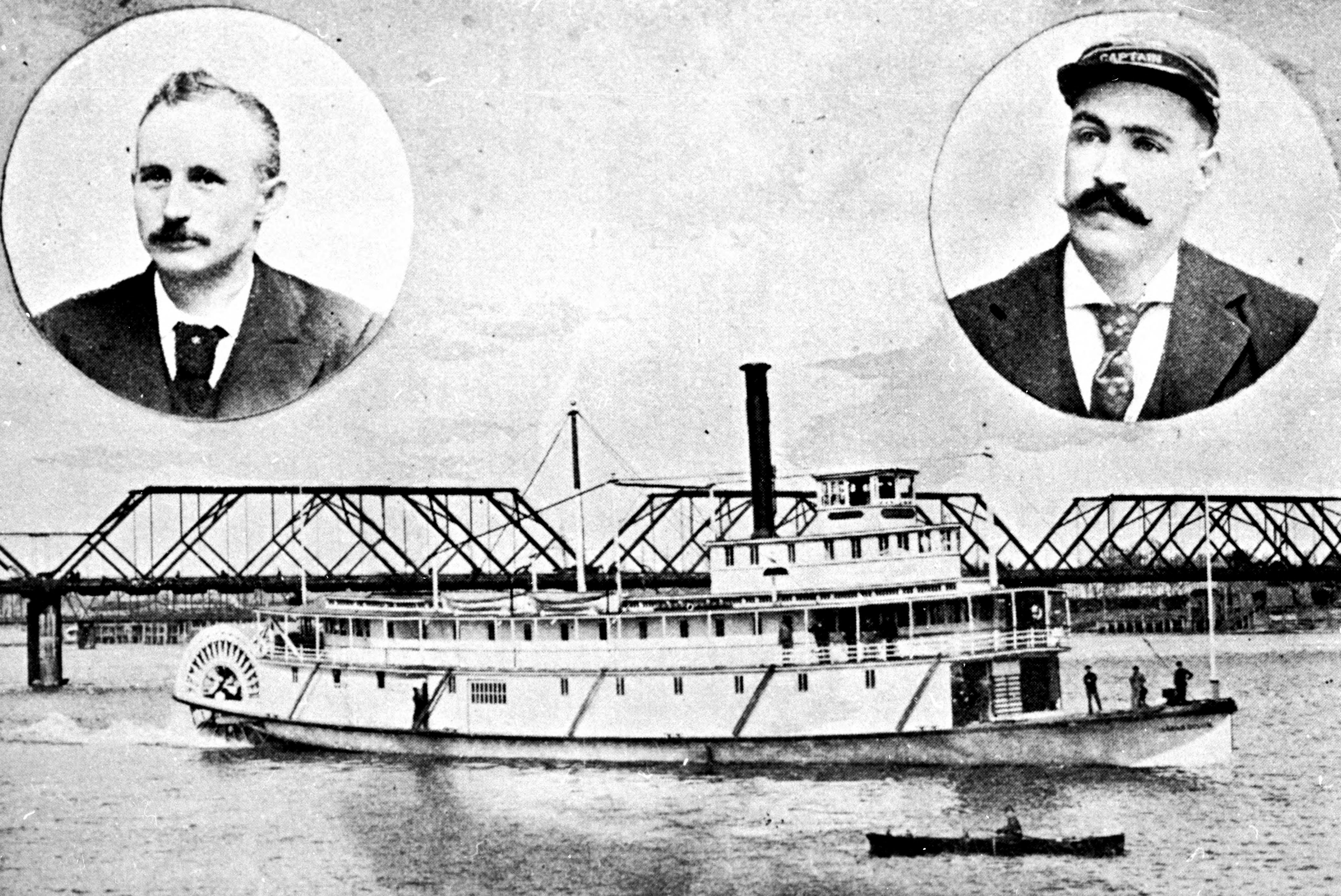
Sarah Dixon as built in 1892, also showing Henry Pape (or Pope) (1852–1907), known as “Poppy” chief engineer, on left, and George McClellan Shaver (1865–1950), captain, on right.

=== Trial trip ===
Sarah Dixon made its trial trip on Sunday evening, April 3, 1892, running from Portland to Willow Bar. The steamer departed the Alder Street dock in Portland at 5:00 p.m. with 180 invited guests on board.

Sarah Dixon made the run downriver from Portland to the mouth of the Willamette River, a distance of twelve miles, in 47.5 minutes against a strong head wind. On the return up river, the steamer, running against the tide, covered the same distance in 50 minutes.

The Shavers included among their invited guests on the trial trip J.R. Beegle, the editor of the newspaper St. Helens Mist, who a few days later, wrote an effusive review of the new steamer: "The Sarah Dixon is as neat and handsome a vessel as ever rode the Willamette or Columbia. She is in all respects a model passenger boat, and none on these waters is more handsomely furnished."

The initial officers of Sarah Dixon were: George McClellan Shaver, captain; C.W. Edmunds, chief engineer; Delmar "Del" Shaver, mate; H.C. Johnson, purser; Lincoln "Link" Shaver (d.1922), second engineer; William Deeds, steward.

=== Portland-Clatskanie route ===
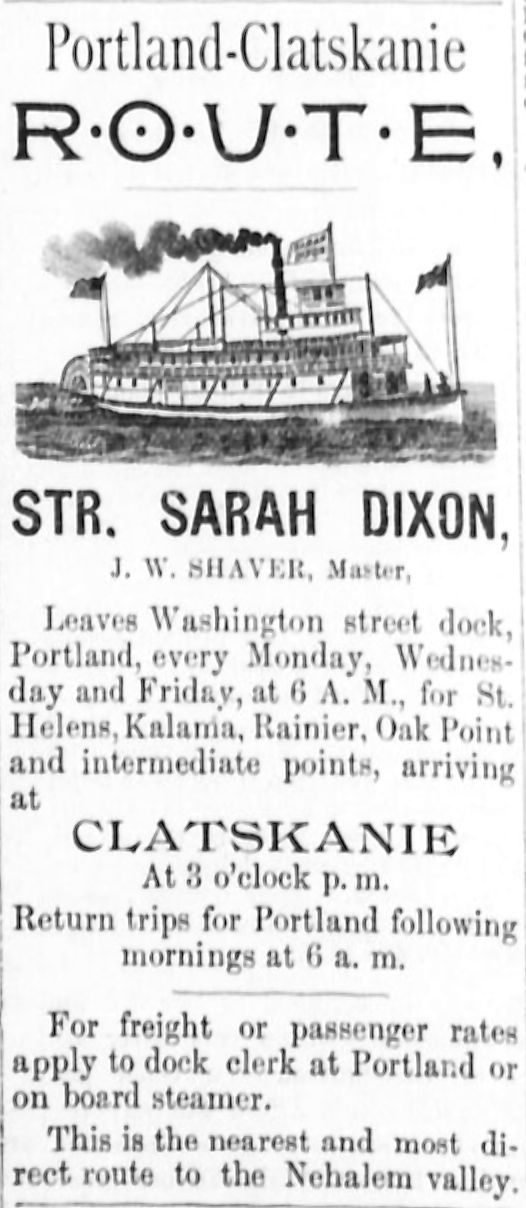
Advertisement for Sarah Dixon on Clatskanie route, April 28, 1893.

Following construction, Sarah Dixon was placed on a route running from down the Willamette and Columbia rivers to Clatskanie, Oregon.

Clatskanie was located about 3 miles up the shallow Clatskanie Creek. Absent tidal effects, the creek was only about 18 inches deep.

Only on high tide could Sarah Dixon, which drew 4 feet of water, reach the town. Constant reference to tide tables was necessary when docked at the town, and if the steamer did not depart on time, it could be grounded in the mud flats, as happened at least once, on the morning of October 22, 1904.

On Wednesday, April 13, 1892, Sarah Dixon made its first trip to Clatskanie, Oregon. Capt. George W. Shaver was at the wheel. As of April 22, 1892, Sarah Dixon was running on the Clatskanie route in place of the G.W. Shaver.

In 1893, Sarah Dixon advertised schedule was: departing Portland every Monday, Wednesday, and Friday at 6:00 a.m. bound for St. Helens, Kalama, Rainer, Oak Point and intermediate points, arriving in Clatskanie at 3:00 p.m. On Tuesdays, Thursdays, and Saturdays, Sarah Dixon would return to Portland, departing Clatskanie at 6:00 a.m. This was advertised as the "nearest and most direct route to the Nehalem valley." J.W. Shaver was master of Sarah Dixon at this time.

Sarah Dixon also ran to Skamokawa in the summer of 1893.

In 1894 the Clatskanie route was extended to Astoria, Oregon. George M. Shaver (1865–1950) was placed in command, with Henry Pape as chief engineer. The fare was $2 for the round trip from Portland to Astoria. Astoria Shipping Company was the steamer's agent in Astoria.

=== Rate war with Iralda ===
Also in 1894, in late April, a rate war occurred on the Clatskanie route between the Shavers, with their steamer Sarah Dixon, and W.E. Newsome, with his steamer, the propeller-driven steamer Iralda. There had been at least one previous rate war between the Shavers and Newsome, about six or eight months previously.

Newsome made a bid to control the trade by reducing the fare on his Portland to Oak Point route to 25 cents each way, and the same amount for transport between way landings. The Shaver brothers, who were already losing $35 a day on the Clatskanie route, matched the Newsome fare cut, and adjusted their schedules, so that Sarah Dixon would arrive in Portland one hour ahead of Iralda.

=== Anti-competitive agreement with T.J. Potter ===
The Potter's owners, Oregon Railway and Navigation Company (OR&N), struck an anti-competitive deal with Shaver Transportation, whereby the Shaver boats, including the Sarah Dixon, would stay off the Portland-Astoria route in return for a monthly subsidy from OR&N. In late November 1894 Sarah Dixon discontinued trips (at least to Astoria) on Fridays. Rates would also be reduced: round trip Portland-Astoria $2.00; one-way $1.25; upper berths, 50 cents; lower berths, 75 cents; meals, 25 cents.

== Further operations ==
=== Racing ===
In the 1890s, Sarah Dixon was one of the fastest steamboats on the Columbia river. Several times Sarah Dixon was able to beat T.J. Potter, a fast steamer, on the Portland-Astoria run.

On Sunday, August 5, 1894, five steamboats raced up the Columbia River from Astoria. They departed Astoria in a group, with Lurline in the lead, followed by Ocean Wave, Telephone, Sarah Dixon, and T.J. Potter. Every boat was crowded to its fullest. The Potter reached Portland first, followed by Lurline, Telephone, Ocean Wave, and, lastly, Sarah Dixon.

=== Cargo carriage ===
Vessels like Sarah Dixon were used to carry passengers as well as cargo. All types of cargo would be taken on. For example, in February 1895 Sarah Dixon obtained a contract to transport 900,000 board feet of lumber from Astoria to Portland at $2.25 per thousand feet. The steamer could carry about 25,000 feet of lumber each trip.

Livestock was also transported on the steamer. For example, in April 1898, Sarah Dixon was in operation on the Columbia, picking up 95 head of cattle at Washougal on April 20, 1898, and carrying them to the stock yards at The Dalles. The cattle had been bought by French & Co., and were to be taken to the Gilliam County range.

Another form of cargo transport was the towage of log rafts. As of February 1896, Sarah Dixon was employed in towing saw logs. According to the editor of the Oregon Mist, a St. Helens newspaper, who was aways a booster for the boat, “[i] is too bad to wear out such a good boat in that business, but the Dixon is a good towboat just the same.”

=== Portland-Cascades route ===
In November 1895, Sarah Dixon was placed on a new route, the run from Portland to the Cascades, to take the place of the sternwheeler Dalles City which was then undergoing repairs. Sarah Dixon was operated on this route under charter to The Dalles, Portland, and Astoria Navigation Company. Strong winds blowing from the east made navigation upriver difficult at least for Sarah Dixon on this route on at least two occasions.

In October 1897, the Shaver concern bought the sternwheeler No Wonder to replace Dixon in the log towing business, with the reported objective of putting Dixon back on the run to The Dalles, then newly accessible to Portland steamers through the recently completed Cascade Locks and Canal. Sarah Dixon was anticipated to be running on the route either in competition or connection with the Regulator Line.

In November 1897, plans were being made to run Sarah Dixon on the Portland-The Dalles route for the White Star line under captain George W. Shaver.

Sarah Dixon was then undergoing an extensive renovation at the Johnson & Olsen shipyard in Portland. New electric lighting was installed, as well as electric headlights, driven by a 150 candlepower dynamo. No definite route had yet been decided on for the renovated steamer, and the initial plan was to hold the Dixon in reserve for the Clatskanie route should anything befall the G.W. Shaver, which was then on that run for Shaver Transportation Company.

=== Portland-La Center route ===
On November 30, 1898, Sarah Dixon was taken off the Portland-The Dalles route and was to be replaced by the Inland Flyer alternating with the Dalles City.

Sarah Dixon was then reassigned to the Portland-La Center run to replace Mascot, which had recently sunk, until the latter vessel could be raised and repaired.

In June 1899, Shaver Transportation Company had two boats which were considered capable of handling work on the route Portland-The Dalles, and there was talk that one or both of them could be placed on the route in opposition to the Regulator Line. These were Sarah Dixon and Geo. W. Shaver. The Sarah Dixon was described as “speedy and in every way adequate for upper river business” whereas “the Shaver is not so fast nor so easily handled.”

=== Excursion work ===
Over the years, Sarah Dixon carried numerous excursion parties to various locations, such as the Improved Order of Red Men to Multnomah Falls, scheduled for July 31, 1892

It was common in the 1890s for sternwheelers on excursions to lash alongside an unpowered barge to carry additional passengers, and this was planned for he excursion, scheduled for Saturday, July 30, 1892, to Martin's Bluff carrying the Knights of Pythias. Brass bands were frequently hired to provide entertainment to the excursionists.

In another example, on Tuesday, June 27, 1899, Sarah Dixon carried an excursion of about 300 people, members of the Trinity Sunday school, from Portland to St. Helens and bank.

In a later example of excursion work, long after the vessel had been converted to towing operations only, on Saturday, June 6, 1925, Capt. Delmar Shaver, as a graduation gift, took the Alameda school classmates of his daughters, Ellen and Doris, permitted Sarah Dixon to be used on a trip from Portland down the Willamette river and up the Columbia.

== Collisions and accidents ==
=== Collision with Harvest Queen ===
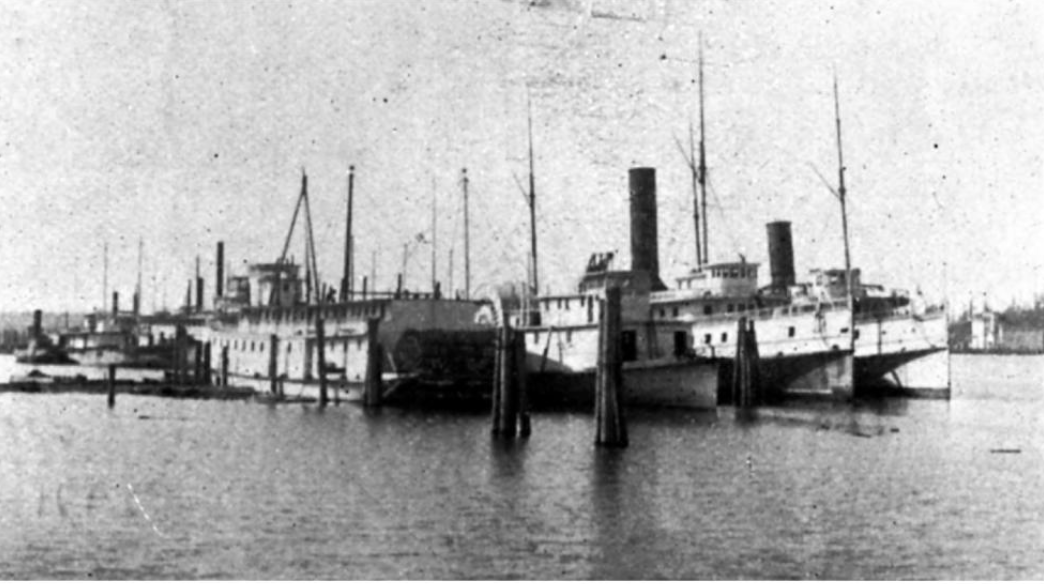
The steamboat boneyard in Portland, Oregon in 1892. Steamboats were taken here to be repaired, await assignment to new routes, or to be dismantled.

On Tuesday night, October 2, 1894, while Sarah Dixon was coming upriver from Astoria and lying at Rainier to take on wood, the sternwheeler Harvest Queen attempted to land alongside, but in so doing crashed into and nearly wrecked Sarah Dixon. Sarah Dixon was struck on the left side opposite the boiler and several feet of the guard and the cabin structure were carried away. A few days later, on October 5, Sarah Dixon was reported to be in the Portland boneyard for repairs.

=== Collision with Lurline ===
On November 9, 1894, Sarah Dixon, under Capt. George M. Shaver, collided with the Lurline under Capt. James T. Gray, in a thick fog near Kalama, Washington.

Damage to both vessels was minor, $50 worth to Lurline and $150 to Sarah Dixon. Even so, following a hearing on December 10, both captains, who were prominent steamboat men, were found to be at fault for violating the navigation rules, and their licenses were suspended for seven days. Even so, the Shaver Transportation Company, brought legal action against Jacob Kamm, owner of Lurline, seeking damages of $2,000 for damage to Sarah Dixon and lost time for the steamer.

=== Collision with Governor Newell ===
On night of Sunday, May 2, 1897, Sarah Dixon collided with the sternwheeler Governor Newell while passing through the draw of Burnside Bridge at Portland. The Dixon lost part of its protective side timber, called the guard, and part of its cabin structure. The Newell, which was towing a barge laden with wood at the time, was not damaged.

=== Collision at Eighteen Mile Island ===
On Sunday, August 14, 1898, as Sarah Dixon was proceeding east from Hood River, a 26-foot (7.9 m) sailing fishing boat with three men on board crossed the path of the steamer. The collision occurred on the Columbia River near Eighteen Mile Island, about 4 miles (6.4 km) upstream from the present town of Hood River, Oregon.

The sailboat was proceeding west, down the river. The men on board were returning from The Dalles, where they had purchased a new wagon and harness, to White Salmon.

The wind was blowing from the west, at about 25 miles per hour up the river, and so the sailboat had to tack back and forth across the river to make progress against the wind.

The Dixon whistled to alert the fishing boat to turn aside to avoid a collision. Instead the smaller boat hit the side of the steamer, and sank. Of the three men on board, two were saved, but the third man, Harper (or Parker) Hansen, aged 18, was drowned.

In a subsequent contested court case, the finding was that the captain of the Sarah Dixon was not at fault, because the sailing vessel had turned unexpectedly, causing an unavoidable collision with the steamer. Allegations were made at trial that the men on the sailing vessel had been under the influence of liquor.

=== Sunk at Mount Coffin ===
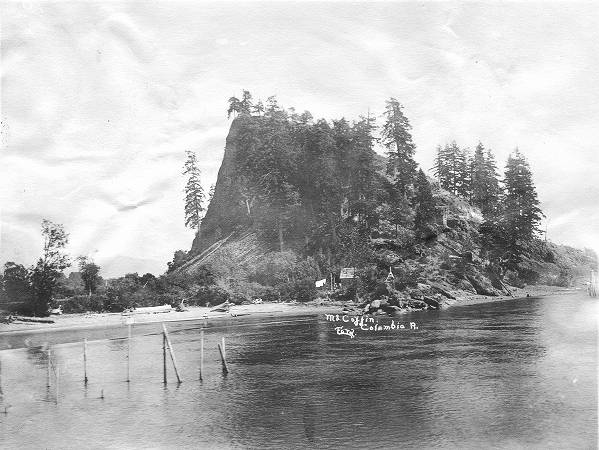
Mount Coffin in 1900, scene of the sinking of Sarah Dixon on December 19, 1900.

At 10:00 p.m. on Tuesday, December 18, 1900, Sarah Dixon departed Portland bound for Stella, Washington to pick up a tow of boom sticks. At about 5:00 a.m. the next day, while proceeding downriver on the Columbia, Sarah Dixon struck the jetty opposite to Mount Coffin (near present-day Longview, Washington), sustaining a large hole in the bow.

In less than five minutes the hull had filled and the boat had settled in the water, which was 15 feet deep. Part of the Sarah Dixon rested upon the jetty. There were no deaths, but damage was estimated at $1,000.

The company's steamer Geo. W. Shaver was dispatched to the scene with barges to raise the Dixon, and it was anticipated that this task would not be too difficult, with the bow of the Dixon still above the water on the jetty.

=== Collision with Annie Larsen ===
On the morning of December 14, 1904, Sarah Dixon was struck by the lumber schooner Annie Larsen when the Dixon was lying at the Shaver dock at the foot of Washington Street alongside another Shaver sternwheeler, M.F. Henderson, which lay between Dixon and the dock. Just before the collision, Annie Larsen had come through the draw of the Morrison Bridge, with the tug Norman towing it on the right side, and the sternwheeler Ocklahama pushing on Larsen’s stern.

No one was injured on Sarah Dixon, but the boat itself was sustained serious damage, both from the direct crash by the Larsen and from being jammed into the Henderson. The outside cylinder timbers were smashed, a stern-wheel crank arm (called a “pitman”) was broken, the guards were badly damaged, as was the cabin structure. Witnesses to the event said it looked like the Dixon would be cut in two.

The sound of the crash could be heard for blocks along the waterfront. Captain James W. “Jim” Shaver (1859–1922) estimated the damage as $1000 to Dixon. Neither Annie Larsen nor M.F. Henderson was damaged.

=== Problems with ice ===
In early January 1909, Sarah Dixon and Dalles City became ice-bound in the upper canal of the Cascades locks. Both steamers were reported to be in a safe location and sufficiently stocked with fuel and supplies to endure a long stint in the ice. The steamers remained locked in the ice until January 21, 1909.

In 1909, Sarah Dixon and the Regulator were immobilized for six weeks in the lock chamber in the Cascades Locks when the Columbia River froze.

=== Grounded on the Lake River ===
On January 1, 1918, Sarah Dixon ran aground in the Lake River during a freshet in a meadow owned by Frank Thorne. Seven steamers pulling at once were unable to free the Sarah Dixon, with the grounding becoming all the worse as the flood waters receded. According to the Morning Oregonian, “‘all of Shaver’s steamers and all of Shaver’s men’ were unable to get her into deep water again.”

In mid-January, Capt. James “Jim” Shaver went to the scene of the grounding with house moving equipment to refloat the Dixon. A barge load of men and equipment was dispatched on January 17, 1918, in the tow of the sternwheeler Wauna. With the aid of J.H. Johnston, an accomplished Portland shipbuilder, Sarah Dixon was finally refloated, undamaged, some six weeks later, in mid-February.

== First transit of the Cascade Locks ==
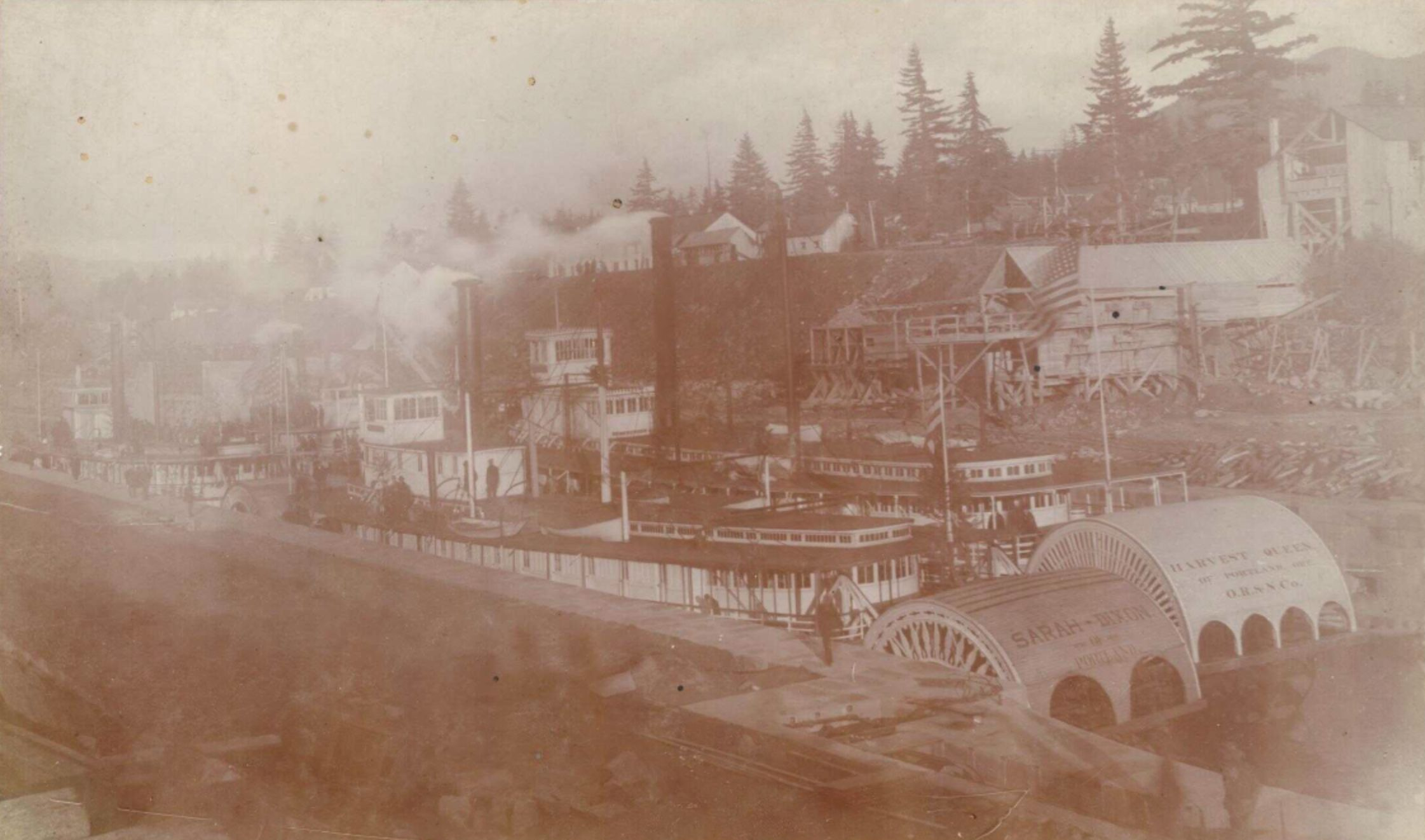
Sarah Dixon (left) and Harvest Queen (right) in the newly opened Cascade Locks, November 1896.

On November 5, 1896, Sarah Dixon was the first sternwheeler to pass through the newly completed Cascade Locks and Canal at the opening ceremony for the works.

The Regulator, owned by the Dalles, Portland, and Astoria Navigation Company (DP&ANC, also known as the Regulator Line) was also present at the opening of the locks, and the two vessels raced to The Dalles, with Sarah Dixon coming in one-half hour ahead of Regulator. The steamers left the locks at 4:30 p.m. and arrived in The Dalles at 7:45.

In addition to the two Shaver brothers who were on board as co-captains, another highly experienced steamboat man, Capt. Fred H. Sherman (1858–1954), who from 1901 to 1913 was to command the famous sternwheeler Bailey Gatzert, was serving as pilot (second in command).

The Regulator Line later offered Shaver Transportation, and Shaver accepted, a subsidy of $250 per month to refrain from competing with them on the run to The Dalles. As a result, Shaver Transportation returned Sarah Dixon to the Portland-Clatskanie route.

== 1906 reconstruction ==
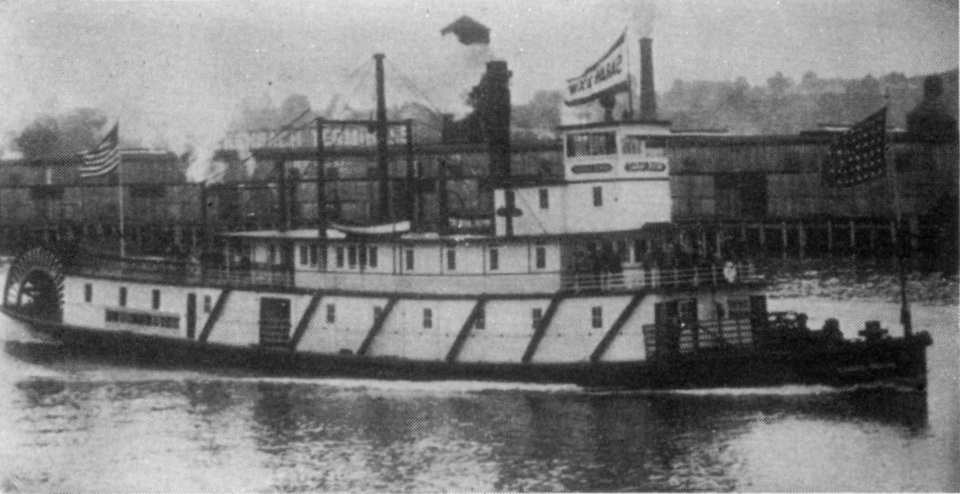
Sarah Dixon with shortened upper cabins following 1906 reconstruction.

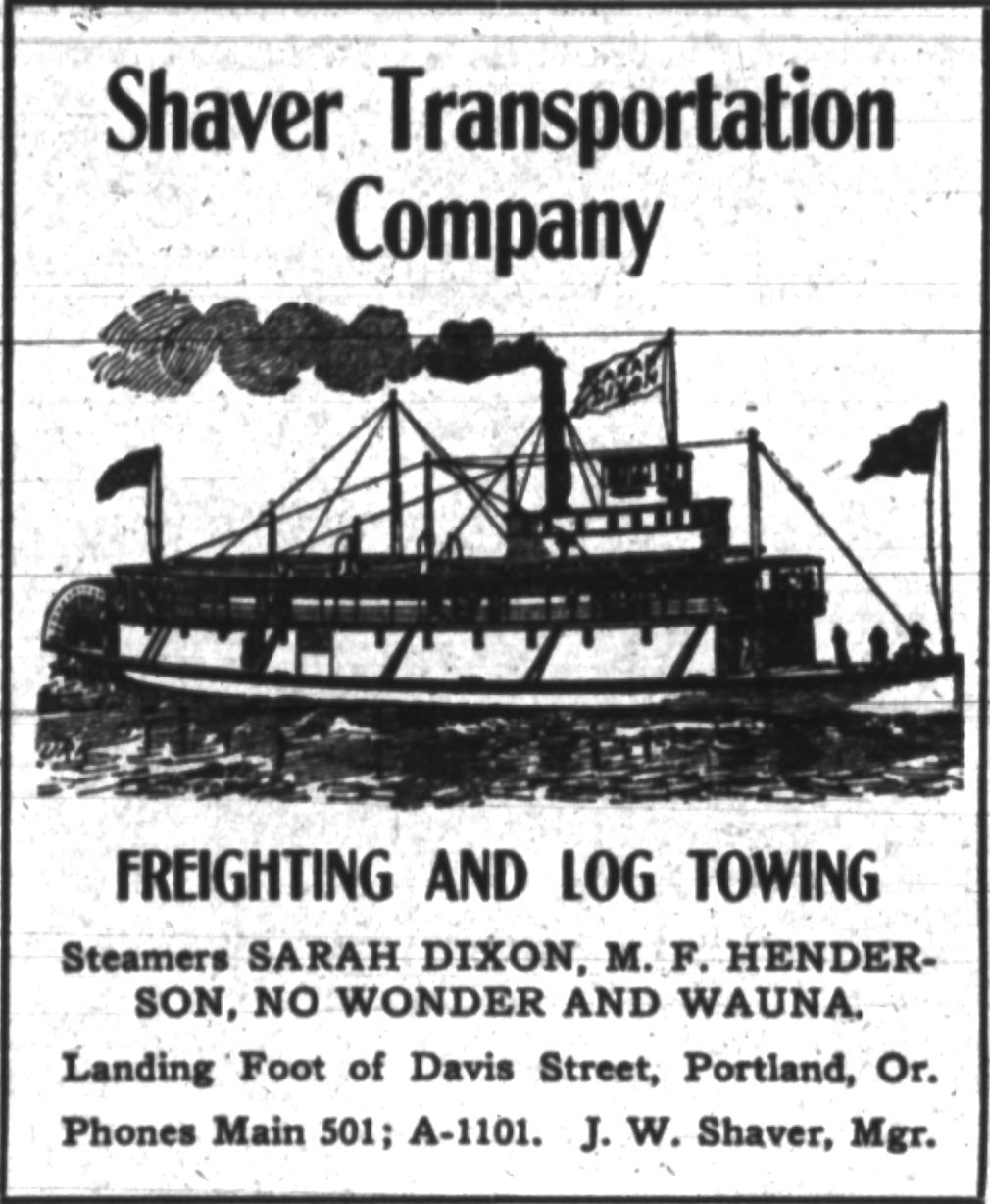
Advertisement for steamers of Shaver Transportation Co., placed September 8, 1907. No passenger service is offered.

On December 21, 1905, Shaver Transportation Co. entered into a contract with Portland Shipbuilding Co. to reconstruct Sarah Dixon. The new hull would be 160 feet long, 15 feet longer than the original. The beam would be increased by two feet, widening the new vessel out to 28 feet. All the upper works would be correspondingly enlarged and overall the boat would be almost a new vessel.

The boat would be converted to an oil-burner and equipped to work in the log towing trade.

The decision to rebuild the Dixon may have been motivated by a trip that Capt. James W. “Jim” Shaver made to Puget Sound to investigate purchasing a steamboat, but was unable to find one suitable for operation on the Willamette and Columbia rivers.

Work on the new hull began, and was still ongoing on February 10, 1906. The old boat was scheduled to be hauled out on the ways on the afternoon of April 4, 1906 to have its machinery removed and installed in the new boat.

The new Sarah Dixon was launched, without ceremony of any kind, on the afternoon of May 26, 1906. The old hull was converted to an unpowered barge, named Sarah.

The dimensions of the rebuilt vessel were 161 feet (49 m) long, 29.5-foot (9.0 m) beam, 7.2-foot (2.2 m) depth of hold, 368 gross tons, and 334 registered tons. The new registry number was 203009.

By July 5, 1906, the new Sarah Dixon was operating in the log towing service, which was dangerous work for its crew.

In February 1907, it was reported that California interests were negotiating for purchase of the Sarah Dixon.

In April 1908, Sarah Dixon was removed from service to have a new boiler installed. The new boiler was built at the Portland Boiler Works. A new stern-wheel was installed at the same time, and these two changes were expected to considerably increase the boat's speed and power. The engines now generated 400 horsepower.

In October 1910, the old boiler, which could still carry 160 pounds pressure, was installed into No Wonder, replacing that steamer's boiler, which could only raise steam to 100 pounds pressure.

== Benson raft towage ==
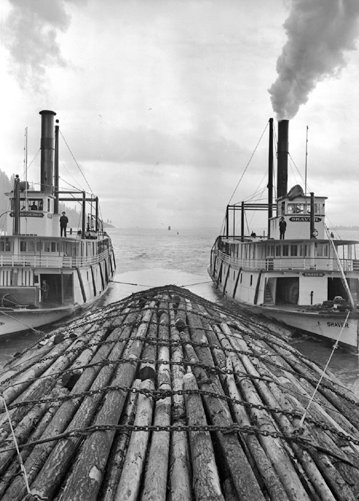
Two Shaver Transportation Co. steamers (Henderson, left, and Shaver, right) pushing a Benson raft on the Columbia River, 1908.

In early August 1908, Sarah Dixon and M.F. Henderson took down a huge ocean-going raft of logs, called a Benson raft down the Columbia river to Astoria, where the raft awaited towing south to San Diego. Dixon and Henderson made another transport of a Benson raft less than two weeks later. Sarah Dixon continued work in towing the Benson rafts as late as 1918.

== Charter to Open River Company ==
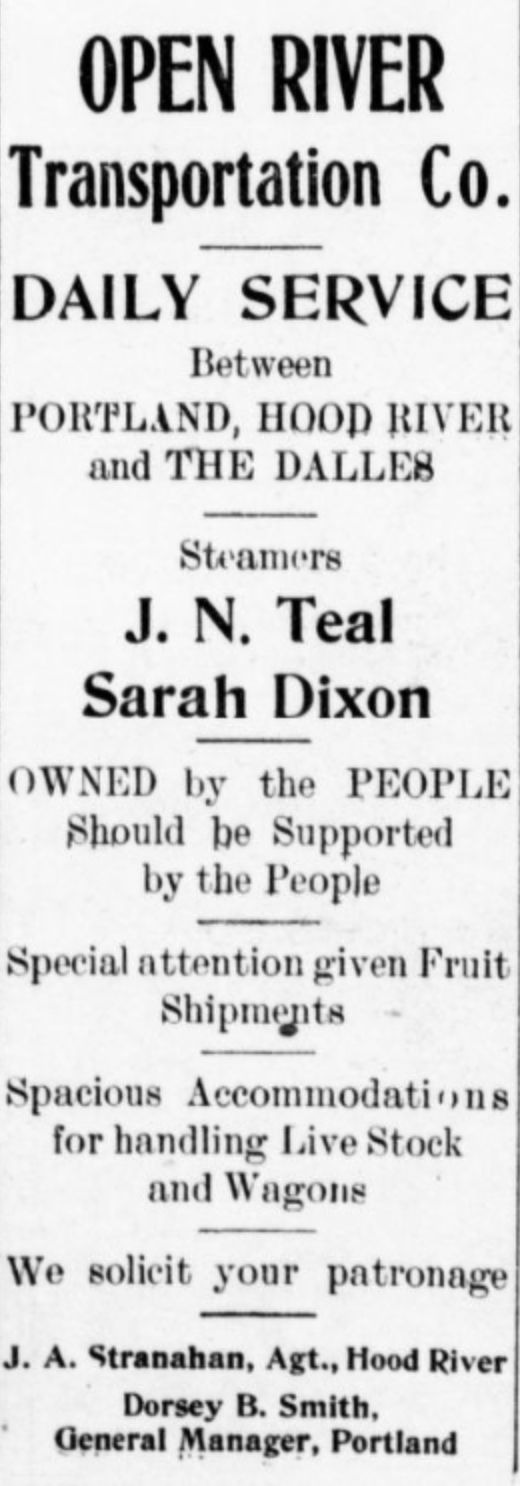
Advertisement for Open River Navigation Co. placed November 26, 1908.

In later September 1908, Shaver Transportation chartered Sarah Dixon to the Open River Transportation Company, for use in passenger and freight service on the Portland-The Dalles run, and further up the Columbia, if possible.

The Open River Company intended to establish a daily service on this route, with J.N. Teal running Mondays, Wednesdays, and Fridays and Sarah Dixon on Tuesdays, Thursdays and Saturdays, both departing Portland at 7:00 p.m. Wheat shipments had been accumulating at Celilo greater than could be carried by J.N. Teal alone.

Close to 1500 sacks of wheat a day were being brought to the upper end of the portage railroad around the Celilo Rapids. The Dixon would be commanded by Capt. W.P. Short, with H.C. Allen as purser. The engineer's crew would be provided by Shaver Transportation Co.

== Construction of Hawthorne Bridge ==
On the afternoon of November 27, 1910, Sarah Dixon and Shaver pushed barges carrying the lift section of the Hawthorne Bridge into place. The lift section weighed 840 tons and was 262 feet long. It was constructed on scows moored on the east side of the Willamette River north of the new bridge.

== 1912 explosion ==
=== Boiler explodes ===
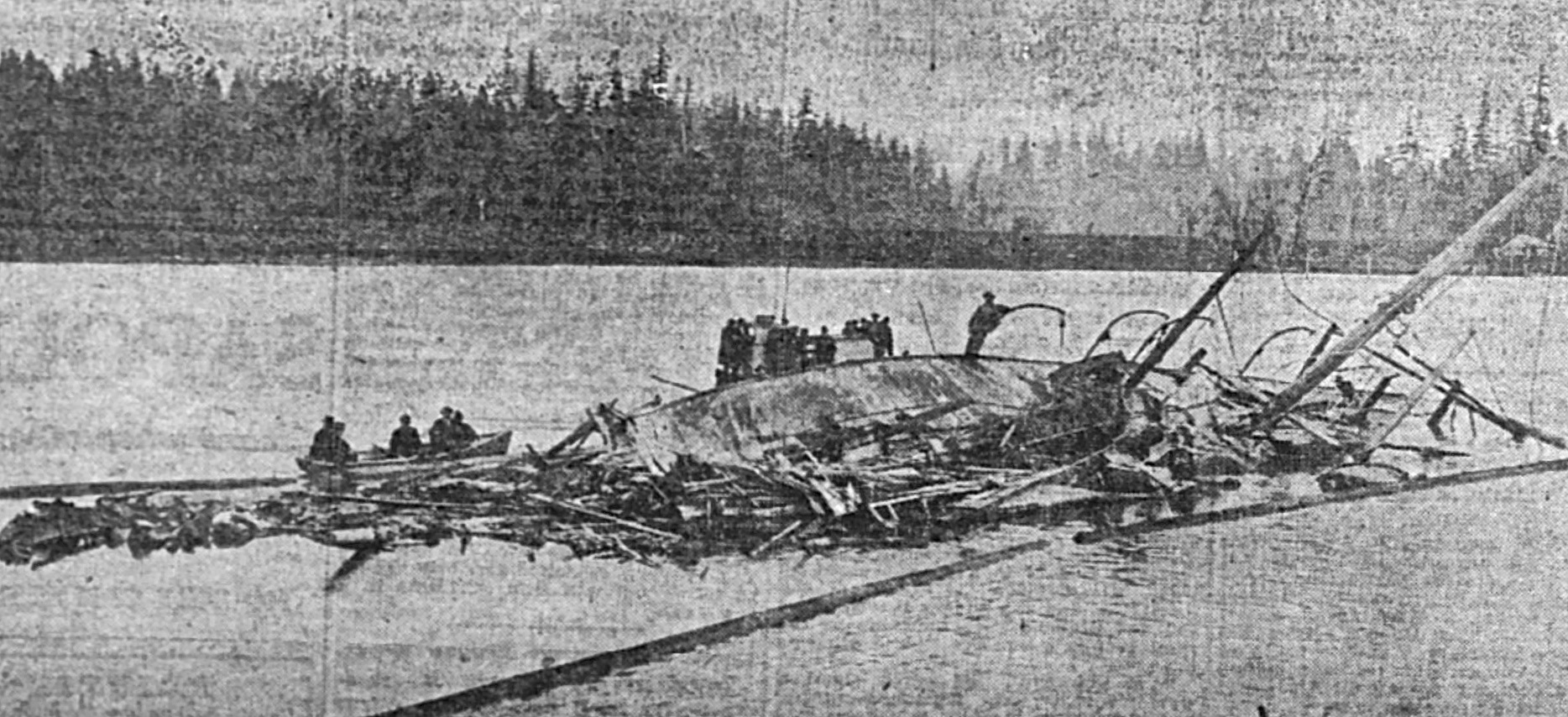
Sarah Dixon after the explosion, sunk in the Columbia River, January 19, 1912.

At 11:15 p.m. on Thursday, January 18, 1912, the boiler exploded on Sarah Dixon. Killed in the explosion were Capt. Fred R. Steenson, aged 32; First Mate Arthur Monical, aged 29; and Fireman Silas Knowles. Arthur Minocal had a brother, Walter Minocal, who also worked for Shaver Transportation Co, as captain of New Wonder.

Nine other persons escaped from the wreck in a boat under the command of Pilot D. Conway. The survivors, some of whom were injured, rowed four miles (6 km) downriver to Kalama, Washington, to get help and medical treatment.

On June 3, 1912, the body of Capt. Fred Steenson was found 20 miles downstream from the scene of the explosion.

The steamer was opposite Martin's Island (near Kalama, Washington) when the explosion occurred. According to one of the survivor's, watchman C.G. Ousley (or Owsley), the Dixon had left Portland in the afternoon headed for Beaver Slough, with no unusual incidents along the way. The captain and mate were both in the pilot house at the time of the explosion.

The chief engineer, Chester L. Lewis, was on duty in the engine room at the time of the explosion and only escaped death by fortune. According to the chief engineer, he had been on duty since 6:00 p.m., and the machinery had been operating normally. Steam was being carried at 205 to 210 pounds pressure, and the fuel in use was the steamer's standard, purchased from the Union Oil Company.

=== Salvage operations ===
When news of the explosion reached Portland, Capt. Del Shaver immediately ordered the sternwheeler Wauna to the wreck scene. At 10:00 the next day (Friday, January 19), the gasoline launch Echo was ordered to proceed to the scene with supplies and equipment.

At the time of the explosion, Sarah Dixon was valued at about $30,000. Although initially the vessel appeared to be a total loss, the company later determined it could be rebuilt into a towing vessel.

Work to raise Sarah Dixon began on January 21, 1912, with barges being placed along each side of the hull, and cables slipped under the wreck to lift it. By the next day, January 22, reports were that by noon, four chains had been placed under the hull, with two more to be installed. Once the chains had been installed, timbers would be laid across the hull from one barge to the other, and then raised by jack screws. There were 35 men at work raising the steamer.

On January 23, the body of Silas Knowles, the fireman, was recovered from the wreck. The fireman's left arm had been severed and all his clothing burned off except for his shoes.

On January 28, 1912, suspended in chains between two barges, the wreck of Sarah Dixon was brought back through Portland to the South Portland Shipyards. It took 14 hours to tow the wreck up the river from where it had come to rest just below Kalama. Two Shaver boats accomplished the tow, with Wauna in the lead and No Wonder at the stern pushing and steering.

=== License proceedings against engineers ===
Steamboat inspectors Fuller and E.S. Edwards began investigating whether low water in the boiler had caused the explosion. It was thought that perhaps the fireman Knowles, who was last seen looking at the water gauge, was doing so because he had suspected the water was too low.

In early February 1912, the steamboat inspection services brought charges of negligence against Chief Engineer Chester Lewis, with trial to occur on Wednesday, February 7. Lewis had been chief engineer on the Dixon since August 3, 1907. Following the trial, Lewis was found guilty of carelessness and his license was revoked.

After the trial, charges were also brought against assistant engineer Stephen J. Meaney. Testimony was taken in the case against Meaney on February 21, 1912. The result of the hearing was that Meaney's license was suspended for thirty days.

=== Claims against Shaver Transportation ===
On February 19, 1912, pursuant to an appointment by the federal district court, Capt. Albert Crowe, marine surveyor for the San Francisco Board of Underwriters, and Charles M. Nelson, manager of the Portland Shipbuilding Company, inspected the wreck of the Sarah Dixon. When the appraiser's report came back to the court, on March 19, 1912, it valued the Sarah Dixon, after the explosion, at $8,340, but less the cost of salvage, which was estimated at $4,345.69, the net value of the vessel was $3,994.31

A.L. Monical, William Steenson (father of Captain Steenson), and A.P. Knowles (father of Silas Knowles), had presented claims against Sarah Dixon, and they were notified of the appraiser's valuation. By law, the claims of the relatives could not exceed the value of the wreck.

In early October 1912 all claims against Sarah Dixon were settled in U.S. District Court with the approval of Judge Bean. The total settlement was $3,000, with A.P. Knowles receiving $750, William Steenson, $1,250, and Capt. Walter Monical, administrator of the estate of his brother, Arthur Monical, $1,000. $750 of the $3000 needed to settle the claims came from Shaver Transportation Company, and the rest came from the Dixon’s insurers.

=== Reconstruction ===
In mid-March 1912, the boiler and water tank of Sarah Dixon had been located downriver from Kalama, and Shaver Transportation Company was dispatching, on March 14, diver Fritz de Rock to aid in the recovery of these items. The hull of Sarah Dixon was rebuilt, and was relaunched on May 13, 1912.

By July 1912, work on the reconstruction of Sarah Dixon had begun, and was then expected to take seven months to complete. On June 4, 1913, reconstruction and a trial run having been completed, the rebuilt Sarah Dixon left Portland on its first commercial trip, to the Lake River to pick up a log raft.

== Fire at shipyard ==
Sarah Dixon on the ways following near destruction in 1924 dockyard fire.

In June 1924, Sarah Dixon was hauled out at the Portland Shipbuilding Yard, at the foot of Nebraska Street, to undergo repairs and maintenance. About 3:00 p.m. on Saturday, June 21, 1924, a fire broke out and spread through the shipyard, destroying the cabin structure and part of the hull of Sarah Dixon, as well as a barge and three small houses near the shipyard.

Capt. Homer D. Shaver, secretary of the Shaver Transportation Company, estimated the damage to Sarah Dixon as $50,000 to $60,000, depending on the extent of harm to the machinery. The damage was covered by insurance.

By the end of 1924, Sarah Dixon had been repaired and the cabins rebuilt, and was back in operation with the rest of the Shaver fleet.

== Disposition ==
Sarah Dixon, on left, in 1940, unpowered and functioning as a floating workshop. Other steamers of the Shaver flotilla are also shown in this photograph.

Sarah Dixon is reported to have been in working service, carrying grain on the Columbia River, as late as February 1934.

When the ship was removed from service, the engines were removed and the vessel was converted into a floating machine shop at the Shaver company docks.

According to the 1934-1935 Merchant Vessel's registry, Sarah Dixon was considered abandoned “due to age or deterioration”. However, Sarah Dixon was in use, reportedly as a barge on August 30, 1937, when a cook who worked on the Cascades, another Shaver boat, fell while crossing the Dixon over to Cascades, leading to a lawsuit against Shaver Transportation Company for $15,000 in damages.

Sarah Dixon functioned as a floating machine shop until March 1949. By that time, the wooden hull of the Dixon was getting soft and the Shaver firm was concerned that it might sink on its own, with all the valuable shop machinery, so the firm arranged to purchase a war surplus amphibious assault ship, called a landing ship medium or LSM, and was then in the process of shifting the machine ship over to the steel-hulled LSM.

The Shaver moorage was then at 3850 NW Front Avenue, in Portland. Homer T. Shaver, grandson of Sarah Dixon, was then the general manager of the company.

The unpowered hulk appears to have been afloat as late as November 1950, when the Battleship Oregon Naval Post applied to the Portland Commission of Public Docks to moor the hulk at the foot of southwest Jefferson street for use as a clubhouse. According to another report, the hulk was towed up the Columbia River to Paterson, Washington, where it was left until the seams in the planking opened up and the boat sank.
