= No Wonder (sternwheeler) =

Steamboat built in 1889

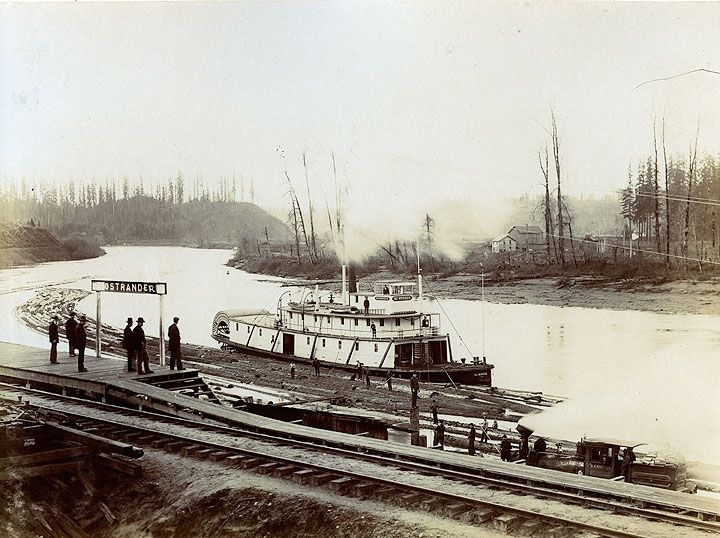
- Steamer No Wonder at Ostrander, Washington.

History
- Route: Willamette. Columbia, and Cowlitz rivers
- In service: 1889
- Out of service: 1930
- Identification: U.S. # 130458
- Fate: Abandoned

General characteristics
- Class & type: riverine all-purpose
- Tonnage: 269.66 gross tons; 235.30 registered tons
- Length: 135.3 ft (41.2 m) over hull (exclusive of fantail)
- Beam: 27.8 ft (8.5 m) over hull (exclusive of guards)
- Depth: 5.6 ft 6 in (1.86 m)
- Installed power: twin steam engines, horizontally mounted, each with bore of 16 in (406.4 mm) and stroke of 84 ft (25.60 m), 17 nominal horsepower
- Propulsion: stern-wheel
- Crew: Thirteen (13).

No Wonder was a stern-wheel driven steamboat that operated on the Willamette, Columbia and Cowlitz rivers from 1889 to 1930. No Wonder was originally built in 1877 as Wonder, which was dismantled in 1888, with components being shifted over to a new hull, which when launched in late 1889 was called No Wonder.

No Wonder served almost entirely in the logging and towing trade until it was abandoned in 1930. No Wonder was sometimes referred to as the Wonder during its operational career.

== Construction ==
No Wonder was built in East Portland, Oregon, in 1889, just above the landing of the Jefferson Street ferry. The original owner was the Willamette Steam Mills & Lumbering Company. Construction was supervised by Capt. Frank B. Turner (b.1859). David Stephenson (b.1835), a native of Saint John, New Brunswick, was the actual builder.

=== Design ===
No Wonder was built as a replacement boat by Captain Turner for the steamer Wonder. Wonder had been built in 1877 by George Washington Weidler (commonly known as "Old Man Weidler") as the first log-towing steamer on the Willamette River.

Components of Wonder were salvaged and installed on the new hull, which was named No Wonder. The new steamer was fitted with special equipment for handling log tows.

=== Nomenclature ===
The joke circulating about the old Wonder was that it had received that have because everyone was wondering where Captain Turner had obtained the money to build the boat. The name No Wonder was chosen apparently as a response.

=== Engineering ===
No Wonder was driven by a stern-wheel, which was turned by twin steam engines, horizontally mounted, each with bore of 16 in (406.4 mm) and stroke of 84 ft (25.60 m), generating 17 nominal horsepower.

No Wonder was equipped with steam steering gear, an invention which Captain Turner had patented in 1888. No Wonder was reported to be the best equipped logging towboat on the Columbia River. The boiler, as of 1910, was reported to carry 100 pounds of steam pressure. As built, No Wonder had a wood-fired boiler.

No Wonder required a crew of 13 to run the boat.

=== Dimensions ===
No Wonder was 135.3 ft (41.2 m) over hull (exclusive of fantail), with a beam of 27.8 ft (8.5 m) over hull (exclusive of guards) and depth of hold of 5.6 ft 6 in (1.86 m). The overall size of the vessel was 269.66 gross tons and 235.30 registered tons. The official merchant vessel registry number was 130458.

== Operations under original owners ==
In April 1890, one J. Ordway was reported to be the principal owner of No Wonder. Capt Frank Turner remained in charge of No Wonder until 1893, with W.H. Marshall (b.1853) as chief engineer. After 1893, and up to at least 1895, Capt. Charles Spinner (b.1849) was in command.

=== Logging work ===
In February 1890, a flood washed away 4,000,000 board feet of logs belong to the Willamette Steam Mills. About 3,000,000 board feet of these logs were recovered. In two days in late February, No Wonder, under Captain Turner, working as far downriver as Clifton, recovered 1,900 logs, paying one dollar apiece for them.

On June 29, 1890, No Wonder, under Capt. James Whitcomb, master, departed up the Columbia River with a tow of logs from the Lewis and Clark River, comprising over one-half million board feet of lumber.

=== Mate injury ===
On February 20, 1890, the mate of No Wonder, Kane Olney, was seriously injured in a towing accident. The accident occurred on the Columbia River, about a mile upriver from Cathlamet, Washington. Captain Turner was in command at that time. The steamer was using its donkey steam engine to haul logs out of the water onto the bank. The mate was out of boat on the bank when one of the irons used to secure the pulling chain to the logs snapped loose from the log, striking the mate in the left temple, breaking his skull and exposing his brain.

Olney was taken on board No Wonder, and the steamer proceeded downstream as fast as possible, reaching Astoria two hours later, where the mate was taken to the hospital. As of midnight, he was still alive, but it was reported that "two spoonfuls of the brain matter exuded" from his skull. Olney survived however, and lived to command other river steamers before his death in September 1936.

=== Complaint ===
On April 24, 1890, F.B. Jones, owner of the sternwheeler Maria, filed an affidavit with the U.S. Steamboat Inspector's office, alleging that the day before, No Wonder, while towing logs on the Columbia River, had crowded the Maria, also towing logs, into a dangerous position from which it took three hours time to extricate the steamer.

== Operations with Shaver Transportation Company ==
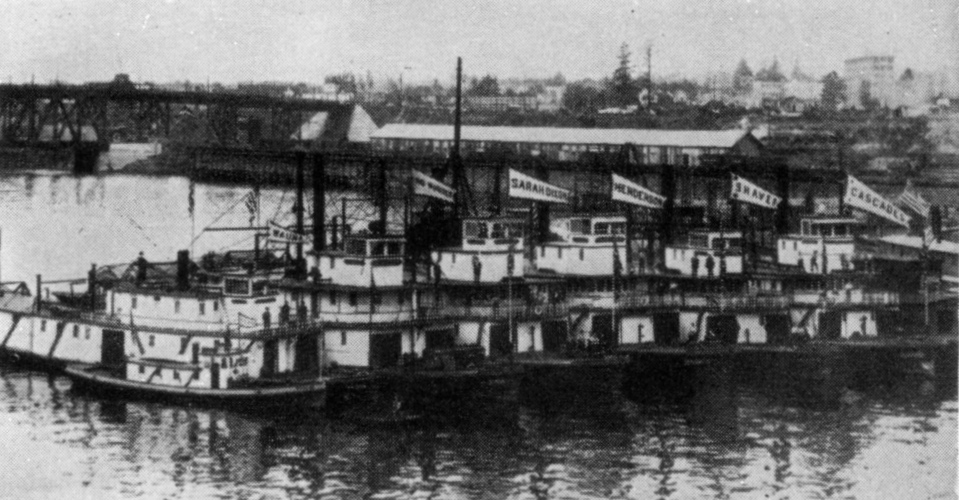
Shaver Transportation fleet, circa 1900. Steamers from left to right: Wauna, No Wonder, Sarah Dixon, Henderson, and Cascades.

In October 1897, No Wonder was sold to the Shaver Transportation Company. No Wonder had been lying idle since the Willamette Steam Mills had burned. Shaver Transportation intended for No Wonder to take the place of Sarah Dixon. Sarah Dixon had been built primarily for passenger work, but was being employed as a towboat by Shaver.

With the acquisition of No Wonder, Shaver intended to return the Sarah Dixon to passenger work on the run from Portland to The Dalles, Oregon, but only after a haul-out and some extensive repairs.

=== Struck snag and sunk ===
On October 11, 1902, on the Cowlitz River, No Wonder ran upon a snag while towing a raft of cottonwood logs. This tore a hole in the hull about 6 to 8 inches wide and 6 to 8 feet long. The captain immediately cast off the tow, and headed to the opposite side of the Columbia River, where he beached the vessel at Rainier, Oregon. On the night of Saturday, October 11, 1902, Captain Shaver departed Portland on the Sarah Dixon to investigate the damage. He was expected to return on Sunday, gather up a salvage crew and equipment, and return on the Dixon that Monday.

=== Collision with T.J. Potter ===
On the afternoon of Tuesday, January 26, 1909, No Wonder sank as a result of a collision with the large side-wheel steamer T.J. Potter. The incident occurred near the mouth of the Willamette River, near Gillihan, in a thick fog. Running under Capt. Fred Stimson, No Wonder was towing a raft of boom logs, and, upon approaching the Potter, gave two blasts of the steam whistle. Stimson heard no reply from the Potter. The two steamers collided, and the hull of No Wonder, which sustained heavy damage in the forward part, began to fill with water. Captain Stimson immediately headed No Wonder in towards the river bank, where he grounded the vessel, after which the crew of 13 escaped unharmed. The after part of No Wonder sank below the surface of the water.

The collision was investigated on February 1, 1909, by the U.S. Steamboat Inspection Service. There was no damage to the T.J. Potter. Damage to No Wonder was estimated at $300. As a result of the investigation, the license of Harry Haslam, acting pilot on the Potter, was suspended for 30 days. Captain Stimson, of No Wonder, was exonerated.

=== Reconstruction ===
In October 1910, the boiler of the Dixon, which generated steam at 160 pounds pressure (or 200 pounds according to another source) was installed into No Wonder, replacing the old boiler, which produced only 100 pounds of steam pressure. (The Dixon received a new boiler.)

At the same time, the hull of the No Wonder was substantially rebuilt from amidships back to the stern, where new cylinder timbers were installed. The stern-wheel had to be lifted out of place for this work to be done.

On the morning of December 10, 1910, No Wonder was back in the water following reconstruction. That day, crewmen heard the cries of an inebriated man, who had fallen off the dock at the foot of Everett Street into the Willamette River. Frank Watts and Burle Campbell launched a rowboat from No Wonder, and found Norman clinging to a piling, where they were able to rescue him.

=== Grounding in the Columbia Gorge ===
On Wednesday, October 25, 1911, No Wonder went aground on the middle Columbia river at Prindle's Landing, near Cape Horn, where the steamer had stopped to pick up a log tow. The Shaver stern-wheeler Wauna was initially sent to the scene to assist No Wonder, and later, on Saturday, October 28, Capt. "Dell" Shaver went himself with Sarah Dixon to assist Wauna. The wind was blowing hard from the east, which seemed to be pushing the water away from the area where No Wonder was stranded, making it harder to refloat the vessel. A report was that the east wind was blowing so hard that it was almost impossible to stand on the forward deck of Wauna approaching Cape Horn.

Wauna was able to extricate No Wonder that Saturday night, by backing towards the stranded boat, while spinning the stern-wheel at full speed, and thereby making a channel deep enough for No Wonder to pass through.

== Later years ==
From September 1916 to April 1917, No Wonder was out of service (except for two days) due to a decline in the need for transport of logs.

=== Charter to Hosfords ===
In 1917, the Hosford Transportation Company needed another steamer to handle a surfeit of logs, so they chartered No Wonder from Shaver Transportation. In early November 1917 the Hosfords returned No Wonder to Shaver Transportation.

=== Loss of a watchman ===
Watchman D.W. Fairclaugh went missing from No Wonder in on the night of Tuesday, December 7, 1920. The steamer was then in the vicinity of St. Helens, Oregon. Fairclaugh had been feeling ill, and been placed in his bunk by the crew. The next morning his bunk was empty and he was not found on the boat. The surmise was that he had fallen overboard during the night and drowned. Fairclaugh was 55 years old and a resident of Portland, Oregon.

On the afternoon of December 18, 1920, a body was found by the Coast Guard crew on the sand spit near Fort Canby. The body was believed to be that of Fairclaugh.

== Disposition ==
No Wonder was abandoned, either in 1930 or 1933.
