= George Washington Shaver =

American businessman

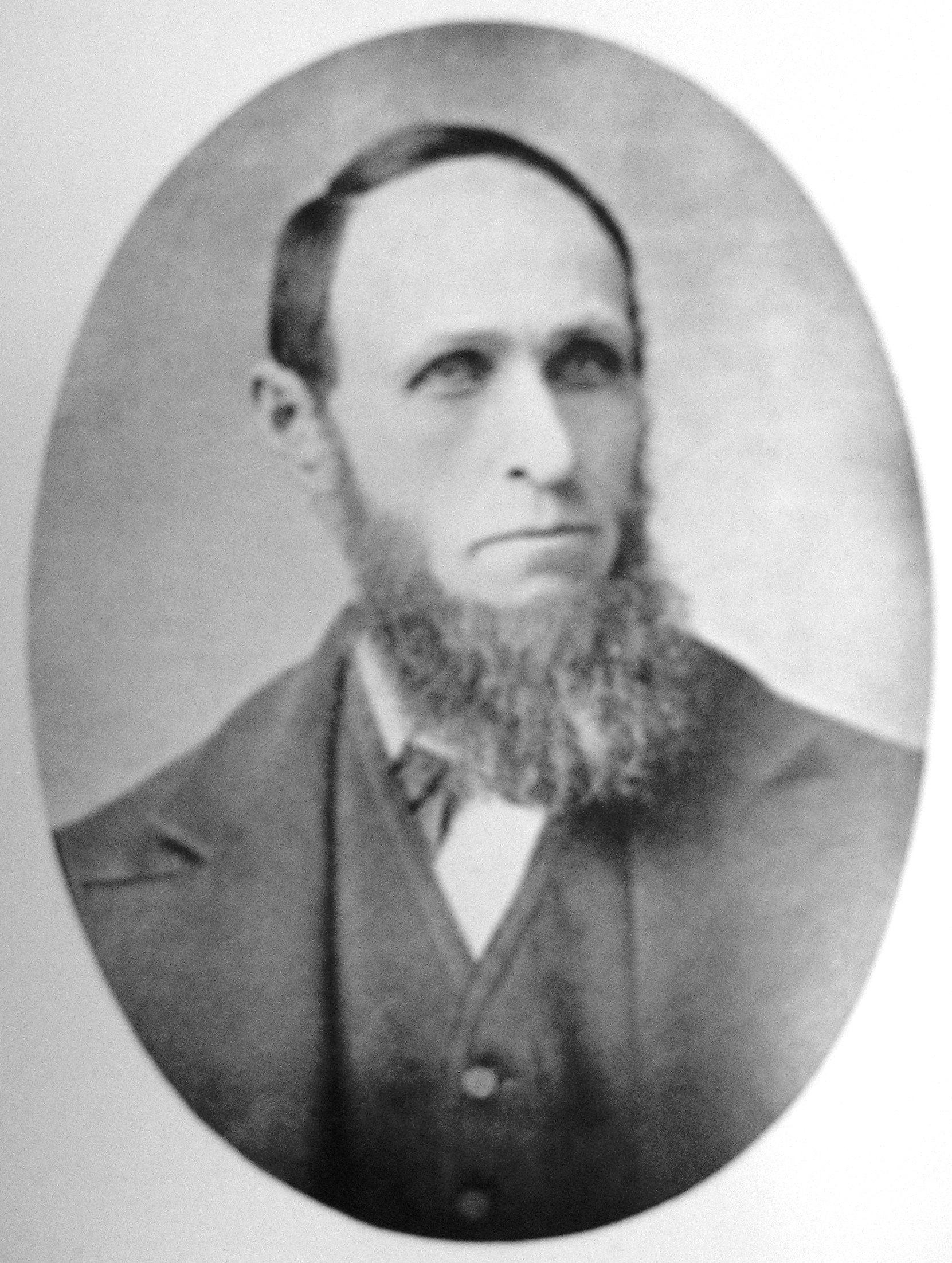
- Born: March 2, 1832; Campbell County, Kentucky, US
- Died: October 26, 1900 (aged 68); Portland, Oregon, US
- Occupation: Businessman
- Known for: Founder of Shaver Transportation Company
- Spouse: Sarah Dixon (1836–1910)

George Washington Shaver (March 2, 1832 – October 26, 1900) was an Oregon pioneer, and, with his sons, a founder of Shaver Transportation Company. He is typically referred to as George W. Shaver or G.W. Shaver.

== Early life ==
George Washington Shaver was born in Campbell County, Kentucky on March 2, 1832.

George W. Shaver arrived in Oregon 1850. Shaver had first gone overland to California for the 1849 gold rush. Shaver settled briefly in Waldo, Oregon, in Josephine County, where he tried gold mining again. This did not prove successful, so he relocated to Portland, Oregon, arriving there on February 2, 1854.

About this time he was married to Sarah Dixon (1836–1910), whose parents, James and Susan Dixon, were residents of Roseburg. The Dixons had originally come from Kentucky.

Following the marriage, Shaver resided with his wife on a farm in Marion County, Oregon. They had four children together when they lived on the farm. After relocating to Portland in 1860 they had six more children. They lived in what is now known as the Irvington addition in Portland.

The Shaver residence in Portland was located between Crosby and Larrabee Streets and Cherry and Broadway. It was still in existence in 1910.

== Business career ==
Shaver entered the business of supplying wood to steamers for use as fuel, including both riverine and ocean-going vessels. This resulted in the clearing of large timber tracts.

In 1880, Shaver, with his son Capt. James W. Shaver, H.L. Corbett (later a U.S. Senator), and Capt. Charles Bureau, became a partner in the People's Freighting Company and also in the small stern-wheel river steamer Manzanillo, which ran on the Columbia River between Portland and Clatskanie, Oregon.

In 1884 the Shaver family bought out all the non-family shareholders in the firm. They built two new steamboats. First was the G.W. Shaver, named after George Washington Shaver, and the Sarah Dixon, named after his wife.

Shaver Transportation Company was incorporated in 1893 and took over all the assets of the People's Freighting Company. The stockholders were George W. Shaver and his sons, Captains James W. "Jim" Shaver (1859–1922) and George McClellan Shaver (d. January 11, 1950). Shaver had another son, Capt. Lincoln "Link" Shaver (d.1922). Capt. Delmer "Del" Shaver was another son.

George Washington Shaver was the president of Shaver Transportation Company, while his son James M. Shaver was secretary and treasurer.

Jim and Lincoln Shaver were killed in 1922, in a collision between an automobile and an electric train.

In May 1886, the Democratic Party of Multnomah County, Oregon nominated George W. Shaver for the position of county commissioner.

== Children ==
Children of George W. Shaver and Sarah Dixon included:

- John Riley Shaver (1854–1906), married to Martha J. King (1856–1923).
- James W. "Jim" Shaver.
- George McClellan Shaver (1865–1950), married to Maude Keenan (1872–1855).
- Delmar "Dell" Shaver.
- Lincoln "Link" Shaver (1861–1922), married to Bertha Kettler (1867–1946).
- Mary Alice Shaver, married to H. Wittenberg.
- Susan Elizabeth Shaver (1869–1957), married to Albert Heintz.
- Pearl M. Shaver, married to George W. Hoyt.

== Death ==
George Washington Shaver died on October 26, 1900. His body was buried in Riverview Cemetery.
