= Manzanillo (sternwheeler) =

19th century steamboat in Oregon, USA

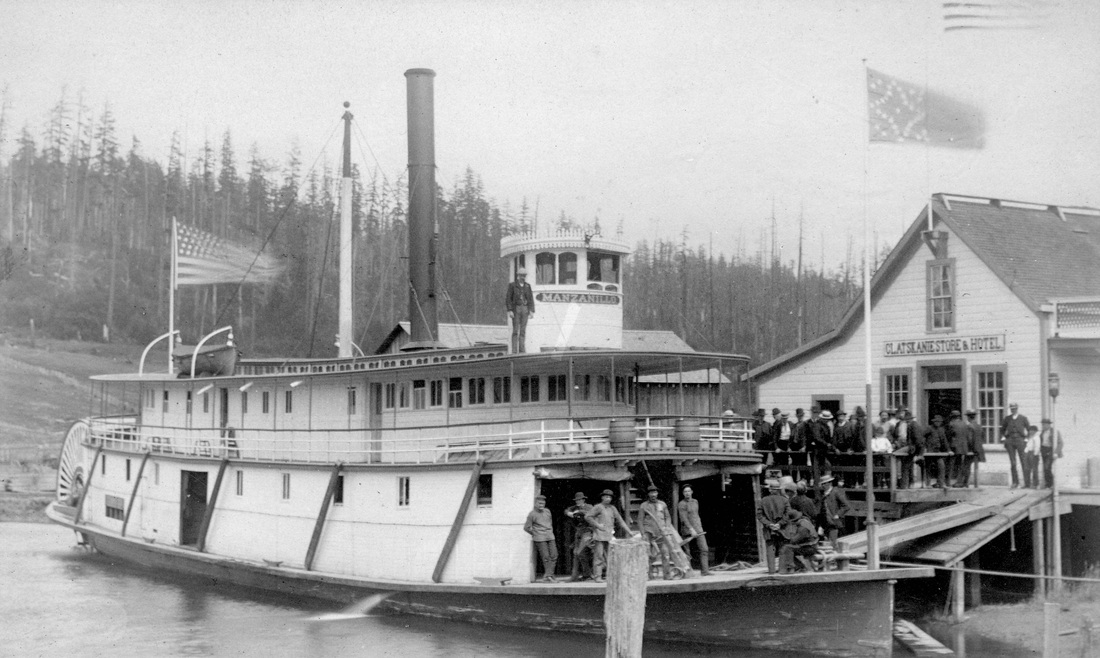
- Manzanillo at Clatskanie, Oregon circa 1885.

History
- Name: Manzanillo (or Manzanilla)
- Owner: People’s Freighting Co.; Shaver Transportation Co.; Waud & Jones
- Route: Columbia and Willamette rivers
- In service: 1881
- Out of service: 1893
- Identification: US #91373
- Fate: Dismantled

General characteristics
- Length: 110 ft (33.53 m)
- Beam: 22 ft (6.71 m)
- Depth: 4 ft (1.22 m) depth of hold
- Installed power: twin steam engines, horizontally-mounted, single cylinder, 12 inch bore and 60 inch stroke
- Propulsion: stern-wheel

Manzanillo was a stern-wheel driven steamboat built at Portland, Oregon in 1881. Manzanillo was first run on the Columbia River route from Portland to Clatskanie, Oregon and way points along the river. The initial owner of the boat was the People's Freighting Company, but the Shaver family soon acquired control of the vessel, which became the first vessel of what is now Shaver Transportation Company.

Manzanillo also served on the upper Willamette River, the lower Willamette (between Portland and Oregon City). The boat was also reported to have been employed on the Lake River. The Shavers sold Manzanillo in 1892. The new owners ran Manzanillo for a short time, then dismantled it and reused the engines on a new steamer they built.

== Construction ==
Manzanillo was built in 1881 at Portland, Oregon by Capt. Charles Bureau (1840–1936). Manzanillo was described as "one of the fastest and neatest of the small steamers on the Columbia."

Manzanillo was 110 ft (33.53 m) long, 22 ft (6.71 m) beam, and 4 ft (1.22 m) depth of hold. The overall size of the vessel was 217.23 gross tons and 129.87 registered tons. The official merchant vessel registry number was 91373.

The twin single cylinder engines generated nominal 9.6 horsepower. Each cylinder had a bore of 12 inches and a stroke of 60 inches.

== Career ==
=== Clatskanie service ===
Charles Bureau operated Manzanillo on the route from Portland to Clatskanie, Oregon, with Henry "Poppy" Pape (1852–1907) as chief engineer.

In July 1885, Manzanillo was owned by the People's Freighting Company, of which Charles Bureau was president and A.S. Foster was secretary and treasurer. Owners of the Pacific Freighting Company were James W. Shaver (1859–1922), Henry W. Corbett, Captain Foster, and Captain Bureau.

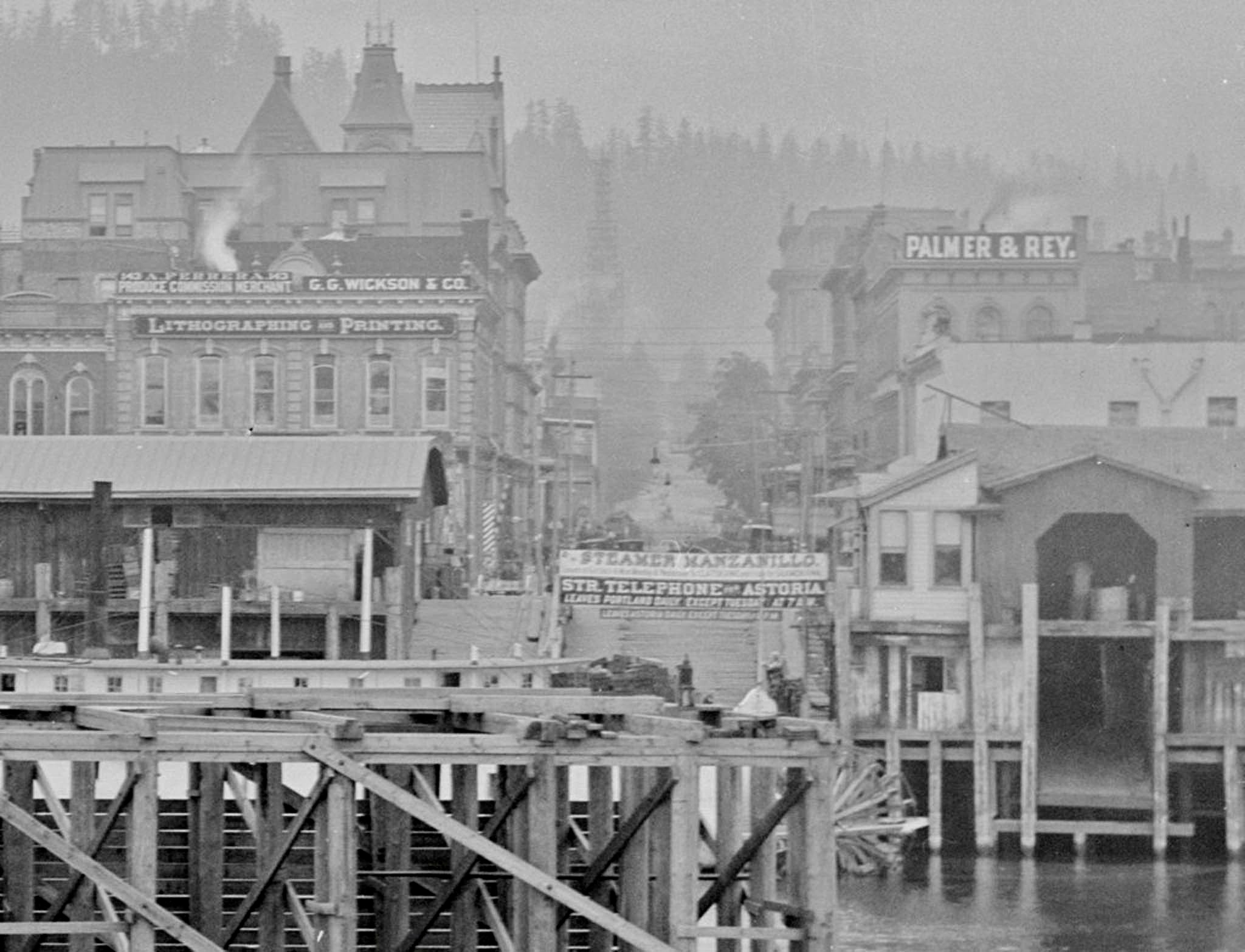
Morrison Street Dock, circa 1890, showing advertisement for service by the steamer Manzanillo.

In July 1885 Manzanillo departed from the Morrison Street wharf in Portland every other morning at 6:00 a.m. except Sunday, running for Skamokawa, W.T. on Mondays and Fridays, and on Wednesdays for Clatskanie, Oregon and way landings, returning to Portland on Tuesdays, Thursdays, and Fridays.

Bureau sold Manzanillo to George McClellan Shaver and Jim Shaver. Jim Shaver worked on Manzanillo as purser and then as mate, bought one-third of the steamers, and then brought his father George W. Shaver (1832–1900) and brother George M. Shaver (1865–1950) in to buy the entire boat.

Manzanillo became the first vessel in what was to become the Shaver fleet.

=== Upper Willamette service ===
In January 1891 Manzanillo was operating on the Upper Willamette River, making two or three trips a week. In March 1891, Manzanillo became disabled, apparently with damage to its stern-wheel and machinery.

By March 12, 1891, Manzanillo had been prepared sufficiently to bring it downriver for repair. Manzanillo was back in operation on the Willamette again by March 22, 1891.

=== Return to Clatskanie and Lewis River service ===
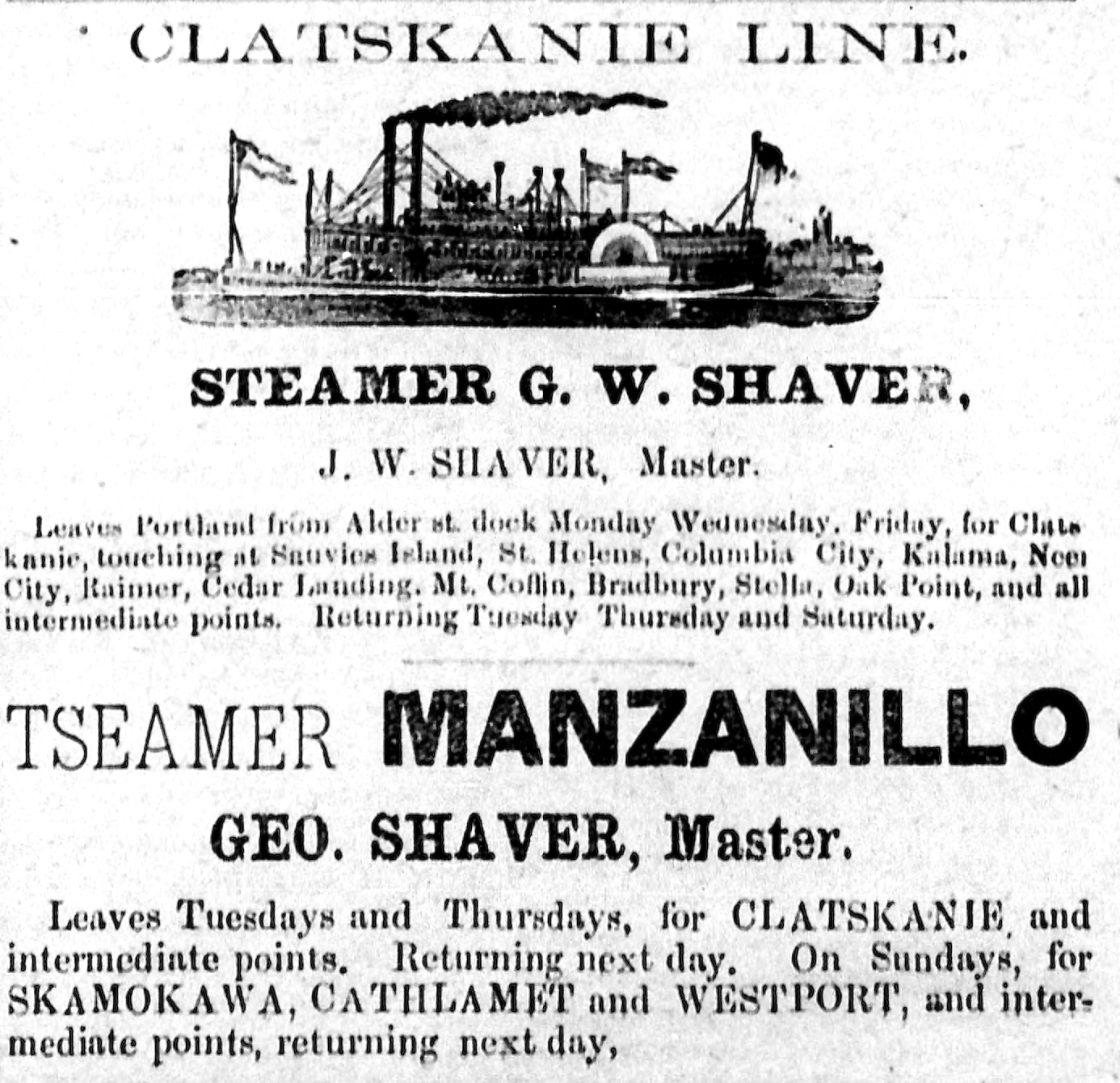
Advertisement for service to Clatskanie by Manzanillo, placed August 21, 1891.

On March 27, 1891, it was reported that Manzanillo had been sold and would be taken off the upper Willamette River and sent back to the Portland and Lewis River route. No purchaser was specified in the report, however in August 1891 the Shaver brothers began advertising service on the Manzanillo, running again from Portland to Clatskanie, Skamokawa, Cathlamet and Westport.

=== Oregon City route ===
In the later part of 1891, Manzanillo was running on the Willamette River on the Portland-Oregon City route, until it was relieved by the Altona on January 1, 1892.

=== Return to upper Willamette ===
In October 1892, Manzanillo was back on the upper Willamette river, carrying grain, flour, hops and merchandise.

In 1892, the Shavers sold Manzanillo to captains Orrin S. Waud (b.1854) and F.B. Jones (b.1838), who operated the boat for a short time. In 1893

== Disposition ==
Waud and Jones arranged to have the machinery and cabin structure transferred to a new steamer they were building, the Eugene. in 1906, these engines later came to be installed in the towboat Pronto, built that year.

The Shavers replaced Manzanillo, which had become too small to carry the trade on the Clatskanie route, with a new steamer, Geo. W. Shaver.
