= Manzanilla =

Manzanilla (Spanish for "little apple" literally) may refer to:

== Plants and their products ==
- Manzanilla (wine), a variety of fino sherry
  - Denominación de Origen Manzanilla-Sanlúcar de Barrameda, a Spanish wine region
- Manzanilla, Spanish term for "chamomile" (any variety) or the plant's flowers, or chamomile tea
- Manzanilla, a common name for Malvaviscus arboreus (wax mallow, Turk's cap) and its fruit
- Manzanilla de la muerte (Spanish: "little apple of death"), manchineel in English (Hippomane mancinella), a tree with apple-like but poisonous fruit
- Manzanilla olive (Olea europaea), a common variety of Spanish olive cultivar

== Geography ==
- Manzanilla, Spain, municipality in Huelva province, Spain
- Manzanilla, Trinidad and Tobago, town in east coastal Trinidad, with surrounding North Manzanilla, Upper Manzanilla, Lower Manzanilla and Manzanilla Beach
- La Manzanilla, a town in Jalisco, Mexico
- La Manzanilla de La Paz, a town and municipality in Jalisco, Mexico

== See also ==
- Manzanillo (disambiguation)
