= Shaver Transportation Company =

American freight transportation company

Coordinates: 45.5582°N 122.7304°W

The Shaver Transportation Company is an inland water freight transportation company based in Portland, Oregon, United States. The company was founded in 1880 and played a major role in the development of freight transport in the Portland area and along the Columbia.

== Early history and founders ==
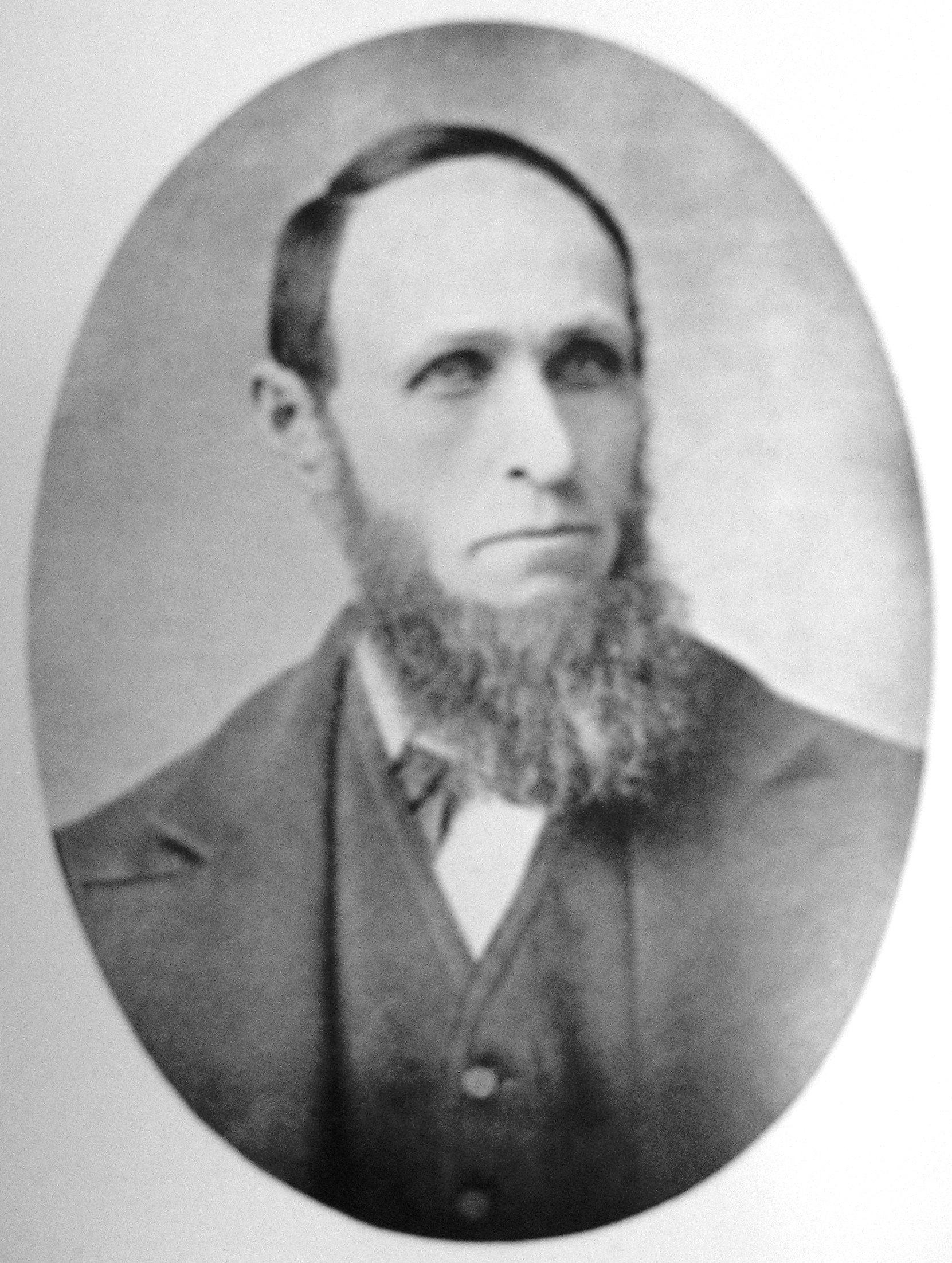
George W. Shaver (1832–1900)

In the 1860s and 1870s, the Oregon Steam Navigation Company (OSN) had obtained monopoly power over riverboat navigation on the Columbia River system. This was before the extensive construction of railroads in Oregon and what was then the Washington Territory, so the only way that goods could be shipped to market was by way of the rivers. Many companies arose to compete with the OSN, and one of the few survivors was the Shaver Transportation Company. Founders of the company included steamboat captains James W. Shaver and George M. Shaver.

Shaver Transportation was begun by James W. Shaver, whose family were pioneers in Portland, Oregon. They owned a woodyard business which supplied firewood for trains, powered then by steam locomotives. They also supplied wood from a dock for steamboats. In 1880, James W. Shaver went into the steamboat business with two partners, Henry W. Corbett and A.S. Foster, both prominent members of the early business establishment in Portland, Oregon. They bought out Captain Edward Bureau and began doing business as the People's Freighting Company. Their first vessel was the steamboat Manzanillo, which they put on the route down the Willamette and Columbia rivers from Portland to Clatskanie, Oregon.

== Insignia ==
Shaver Transportation Company was known as the "Red Collar Line."

== Early steamboat operations ==
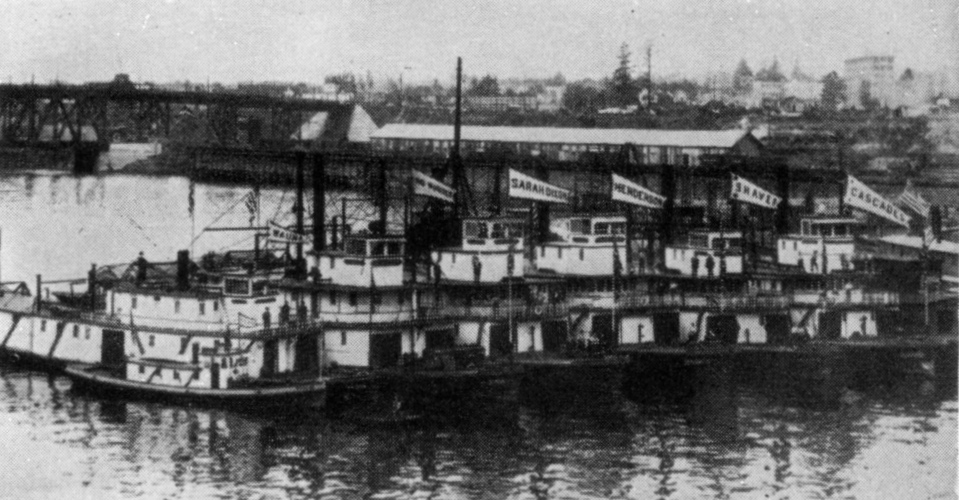
Shaver Transportation fleet, circa 1900

The next two steamboats owned by the company after the Manzanillo were the Sarah Dixon (named after the mother of company founder James W. Shaver) and G.W. Shaver, named after George Washington Shaver, the father of James W. Shaver. The Sarah Dixon had a reputation as a luxury boat, and in the early 1890s, she was placed on the profitable run on the lower Columbia River from Portland to Astoria, Oregon. On that run she competed with the T. J. Potter, another luxury boat owned by the Oregon Railway and Navigation Company (ORNC). This competition was resolved in about 1896, when Shaver Transportation took its boats off the Portland/Astoria run in return for a monthly subsidy from ORNC.

In 1897, Shaver Transportation bought their fourth boat, the No Wonder, which had been built in 1877 by another founder of Portland, by George Washington Weidler, for log-towing purposes, and named the Wonder. (Weidler rebuilt Wonder in 1889 and named her No Wonder, hence her name.) Shaver Transportation used No Wonder for log-towing and as a training school for pilots until 1933, when No Wonder was dismantled. 56 years of use was an exceptional length of time for a wooden-hulled boat.

In 1908, the company built the sternwheelers Shaver and a new Dixon as replacements for the old G.W. Shaver and Sarah Dixon. Typical for steamboats built in those days, the Shaver included previously used mechanical components from other steamboats. In the Shaver's case, these included steam valves that had served in at least two prior steamboats going back to 1857. Once built, Shaver was used as a tow and work boat.

Another long-lived Shaver boat was the Henderson, which was launched in 1901, sunk and rebuilt in 1912, rebuilt and re-engined in 1929, and sunk and raised again in 1950. Henderson was used in important towing work such as when for example, in the 1940s she was dispatched with four other towing vessels to pull the Standard Oil tanker "F.S. Follis" off from where the tanker had grounded near the mouth of the Willamette River. The end only came for the wooden-hulled Henderson in 1956 near Astoria, when she was damaged beyond her economic value in a collision with her tow.

== Design innovations ==
Shaver steamboats were all sternwheelers, which gave advantages on the Columbia River. They did not require fixed docks for landings, and they were more powerful and easier to steer than sidewheelers. Traditionally, most steamboats on the Columbia River system were sternwheelers. Shaver Transportation broke away from this pattern in 1926 when Shaver was rebuilt as a twin-screw diesel boat. Shaver served in this configuration for about twenty years. One notable tow job was of the USS Constitution when that vessel was taken on tour to the West Coast, including Portland, in 1934.

Another important tow job engaged in by Shaver and four other vessels was pulling the Standard Oil Tanker F.S. Follis off where the tanker had grounded near the mouth of the Willamette River. The plans for the rebuilt Shaver were later used by the Marietta Iron Works (in Marietta, Ohio) to build a vessel which became the pattern for later towboats on the Ohio and Mississippi rivers.

== Reflection of influence in Portland street names ==
Many streets in Portland were named after steamboats, steamboat captains or company owners. One example is Hassalo street, named after a famous sternwheeler. Another is Corbett, named after one of the first partners in the Shaver Transportation Company.

Shaver itself is another example, it is named for George Washington Shaver. Both Shaver and Hassalo streets are located near the east side neighborhood of Portland known as Irvington, which in turn was named after steamboat captain William Irving, who as it turns out was married to Elizabeth Dixon, the sister of Sarah Dixon and wife of G.W. Shaver.

== Role in film production ==
Henderson played the part of River Queen in the film Bend of the River in 1952, which was filmed in Oregon and on the Columbia River, and starred James Stewart. To promote this film, Henderson re-enacted a steamboat race on January 24, 1952, with one of the few remaining steamers left on the Columbia River, the steel-hulled sternwheeler Portland, built in 1947.

== See also ==
- Steamboats of the Columbia River
