= Regulator (sternwheeler) =

Sternwheel-driven steamboat in United States

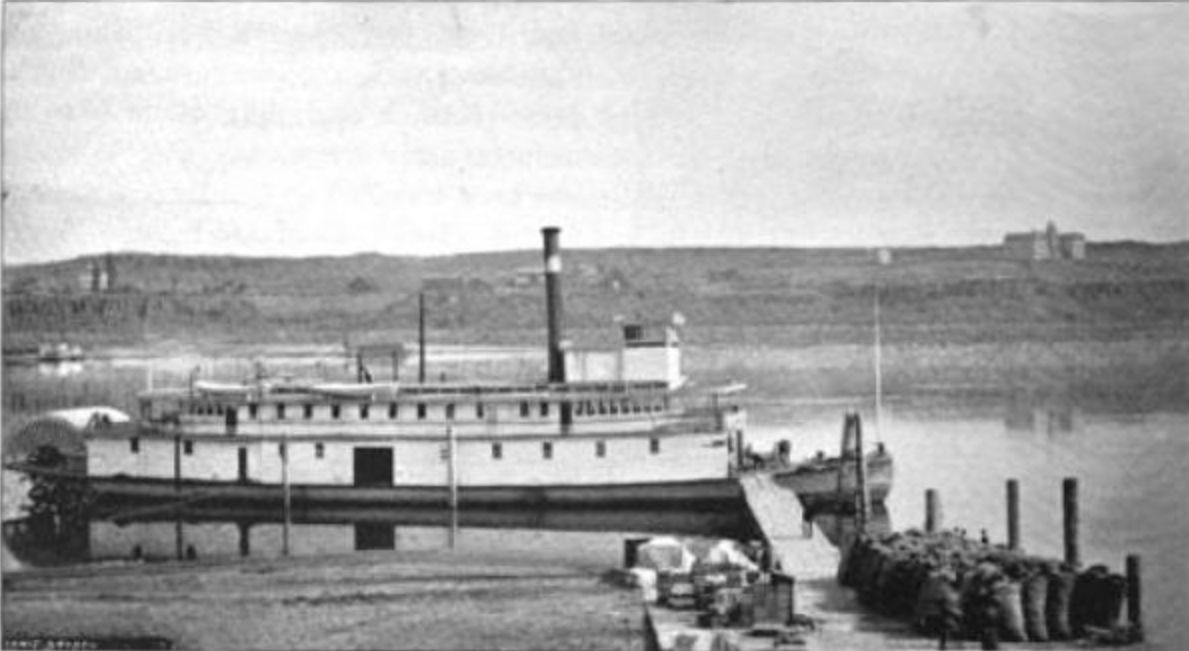
- Regulator at the dock at the foot of Court Street, The Dalles, Oregon, circa 1892

History
- Name: Regulator
- Owner: Dalles, Portland, and Astoria Nav. Co.
- Route: Columbia River
- Builder: Louis Paquet
- Cost: $30,000
- Completed: 1891
- Out of service: 1906
- Identification: U.S. 110935
- Fate: Destroyed by explosion and fire

General characteristics
- Type: Riverine all-purpose
- Length: 152 ft (46.3 m) over hull (exclusive of fantail)
- Beam: 28 ft 9 in (8.8 m) over hull (exclusive of guards
- Depth: 6.5 ft 0 in (1.98 m)
- Decks: two (main and passenger)
- Installed power: twin steam engines, horizontally mounted, each with bore of 16 in (406.4 mm) and stroke of 7 ft (2.13 m); 300 to 350 total indicated HP.
- Propulsion: stern-wheel
- Speed: Maximum reported: 18.5 miles per hour.

Regulator was a sternwheel-driven steamboat built in 1891 which operated on the Columbia River until 1906, when it was destroyed by explosion which killed two of its crew, while on the ways undergoing an overhaul at St. Johns, Oregon.

== Construction ==
=== Plans for the new vessel ===
Regulator was built by Louis Paquet, an experienced shipbuilder of Portland, Oregon.

The boat was contracted for by the Dalles, Portland and Astoria Navigation Company, popularly known as the Regulator Line, or by its abbreviation, DP&AN. This company had been organized to provide steamboat service from The Dalles to the lower Columbia river, by a combination of steamboats and a newly built, state-funded portage railway around the main obstruction on the route, the Cascades Rapids.

The first annual meeting of DP&AN subscribers was held on Saturday, April 4, 1891, at 2:00 p.m. at the Board of Trade, in The Dalles, Oregon. DP&AN had appointed a committee to examine the costs and other details of constructing a steamboat to run on the Columbia River between The Dalles and Cascade Locks, to make a connection with the portage railway around Cascades Rapids.

In mid-March, 1891, the DP&AN committee returned to The Dalles, having made arrangements with four shipbuilders to submit, to the company's first annual meeting, to be held on April 4, sealed bids for a steamboat that would be 160 feet long, 30 foot beam, and 7 foot depth of hold, capable of a speed of 17 to 18 knots. The bids were to give estimates of everything connected with the vessel except the furniture.

At the April 4 annual meeting, the committee reported that they had awarded the contract to build the vessel to Paquet & Smith, for the price of $25,000, with directions to construct a sternwheeler at any point between Cascades Locks and The Dalles, to be finished by August 1, 1891. The boat was required to be capable of speed of 15 miles per hour. Hugh Glenn was appointed to be superintendent of the construction of the vessel.

=== Construction at The Dalles ===
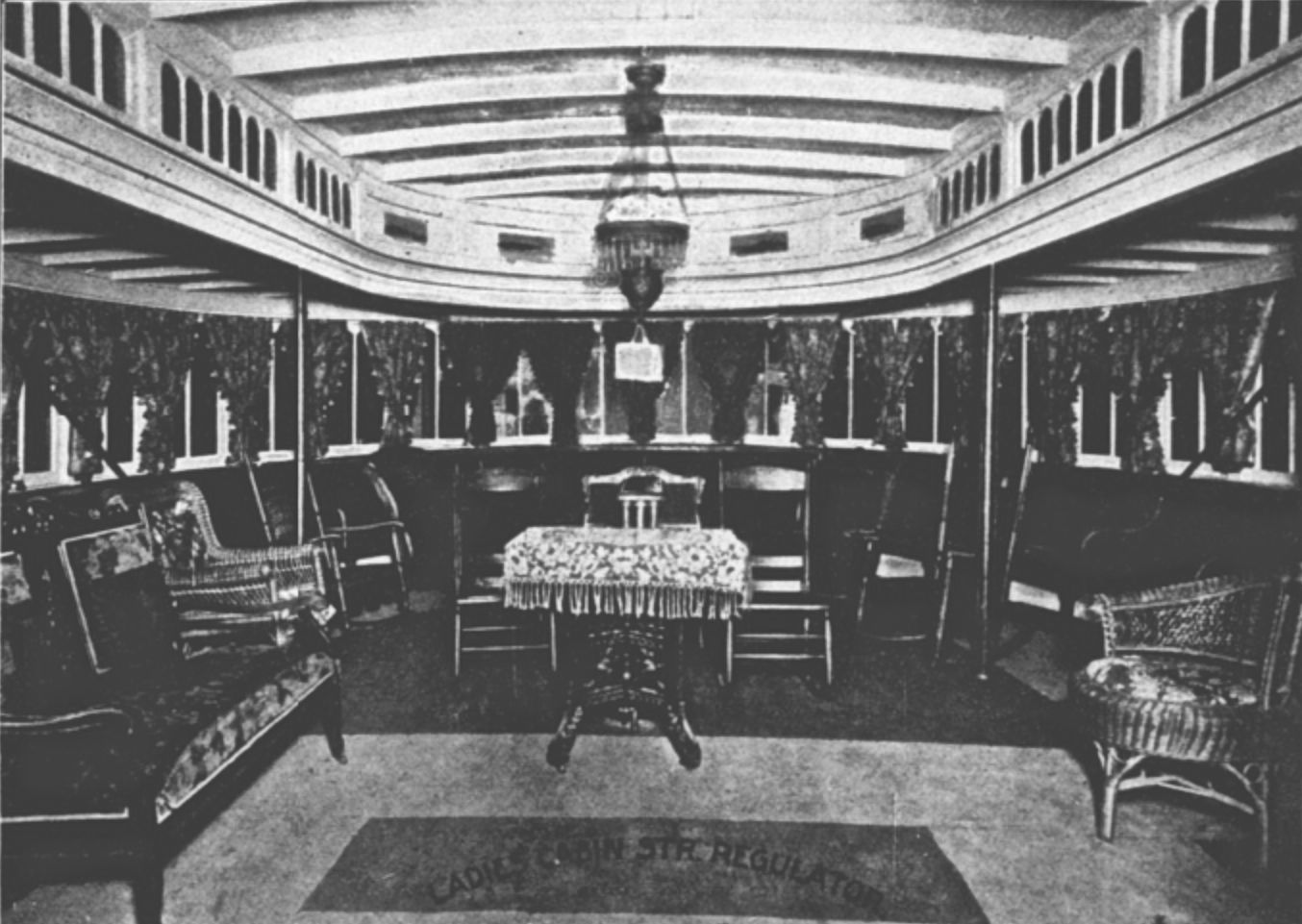
The ladies' cabin

The new steamer, named Regulator, was built in The Dalles, Oregon, on bank of the Columbia River at the foot of Washington Street. On Thursday, June 25, 1891, the still incomplete Regulator was launched. The ceremony began at 11:00 a.m. with an optimistic speech by B.S. Huntington. At exactly 3:00 p.m., Miss Bessie French broke a bottle of wine over the bow of the steamer, christening the vessel. Workman then knocked out the props under the hull, and the boat slid into the water.

The boat was driven by twin steam engines, horizontally mounted, each with bore of 16 in (406.4 mm) and stroke of 7 ft (2.13 m), producing 300 to 350 total indicated HP.

In mid-July, 1891, the hull was complete, the lower works were nearly done, and the upper cabin (called a "saloon") was shortly to be enclosed. The engines were expected to arrive on the 17th or 18 July. All wood work on the vessel was expected to be complete on about August 1. The boiler was built by the Willamette Iron and Steel Works, in Portland.

By August 4, 1891, the boiler had been installed, and painting was expected to begin within a few days.

== Dimensions and appearance ==
Regular's hull was 152 feet long, exclusive of the extension over the stern, called a fantail, on which the sternwheel was mounted. The beam was 28 feet and depth of hold was 6.5 feet.

Regulator’s size was 434.18 gross and 334.88 net tons. The official merchant vessels registry number was 110935. Regulator had a cargo-carrying capacity of 240 tons. The maximum speed was 17 miles per hour. The pilot house was originally decorated with a pair of antlers donated by a merchant of The Dalles.

== Operations ==
Regulator was intended to compete with, or "regulate" as was then the term, the perceived monopoly on riverine and railroad transport held in region of The Dalles by the Union Pacific Railway. When Regulator was still under construction, a local newspaper strongly endorsed patronage of the Regulator and recommended boycotts of any merchant who might continue to use the Union Pacific.

Not a pound of merchandise to or from Portland should be shipped by the Union Pacific road or boat. The freight rates will be dollars and dollars per ton less by the new line than by the railroad as at present operated, but the U. P. will undoubtedly meet the reduced rates and no doubt in many instances will give shippers better terms than the Regulator folks can.

But such terms should not be accepted. To a man our merchants should stand by the home company. No person who desires to live and do business in The Dalles can afford not to ship by the river. If a merchant continues to patronize the railroad after the home line is in operation, the fact should be made known and the patronage of the entire public be withdrawn from him until he comes into line and does his share toward building up the business of The Dalles.

=== Trial trip ===
The trial trip of the Regulator was run on September 10, 1891, with the boat departing from The Dalles at 9:34 a.m., proceeding downstream towards the Cascades, which it reached at 12:04, with landings en route at White Salmon, Stanley Point, Hood River, and Chenowith. The steamer travelled 18.5 miles in the first hour of the trip, while going into a 20-mile per hour head wind. A newspaper reporter opined that "it is perfectly safe to say she is god for 20 miles down stream anytime." Regulator covered the 45-mile distance between The Dalles and Cascade Locks in 2 hours and 26 minutes. Along the way people at residences and settlements came out to wave handkerchiefs as a salute to the steamer.

On board were sixty invited guests, mostly stockholders of the company and their wives, as well as the builder, Louis Pacquet, of Portland, Oregon. The company could not find enough waiters to hire for the occasion, so the first passengers were informed to bring a picnic basket dinner, and the company would provide coffee and tea free of charge. Regulator departed the Cascades at 1:24 p.m. and arrived back at The Dalles at the dock at the foot of Court Street at 4:50 p.m. On the morning of the next day, September 11, 1891, the directs of The Dalles, Portland & Astoria Navigation Company held a meeting at the office of contractor Hugh Glenn, and formally accepted the vessel from the builders, Pacquet & Smith.

=== Early competition with Union Pacific ===
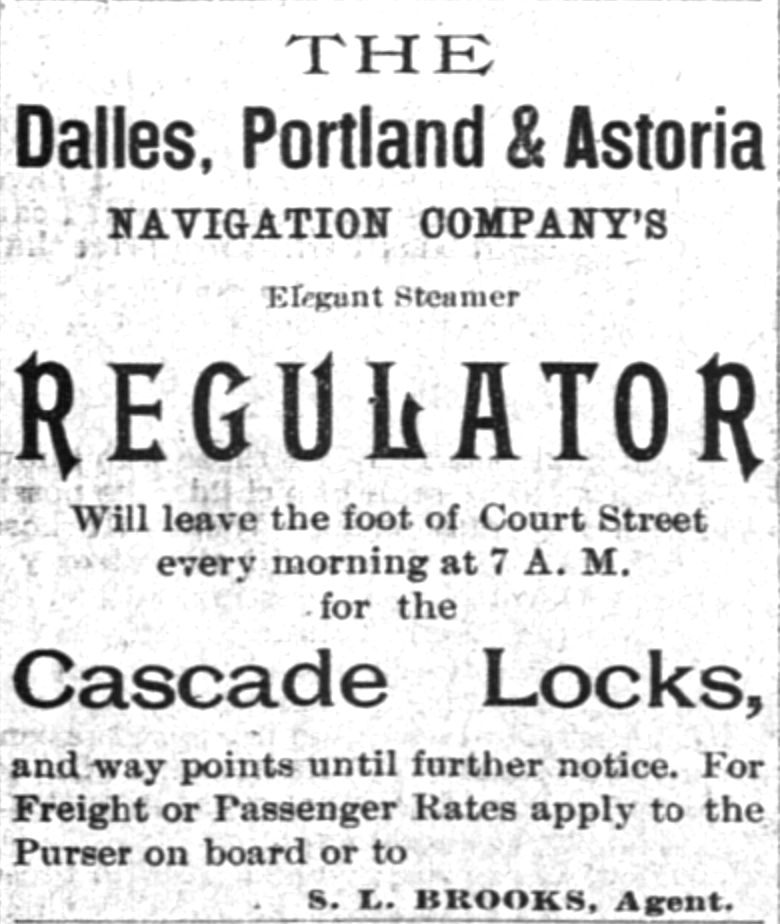
Early advertisement for Regulator, placed September 19, 1891.

As of September 19, 1891, Regulator was running for the Dalles, Portland, and Astoria Navigation Company on a route from the foot of Court Street at The Dalles for Cascade Locks, Oregon every morning at 7:00 a.m., and stopping at way points en route. S.L. Brooks was the steamer's agent in The Dalles. Frederick H. "Fred" Sherman was the first captain of the Regulator.

The principal competitor of the Dalles, Portland and Astoria line was the Union Pacific Railroad, which, in addition to its rail line along the river, owned and operated steamboats on the Columbia River.

On October 21, 1891, Regulator was charging $1 per person for passenger fares from The Dalles to Portland. Union Pacific was charging $3.85 for passage on its steamers and trains up until then, but then dropped its rates precipitously to 50 cents, on the steamers only There were no cuts in the freight rates

Union Pacific also owned the portage railway around the Cascades Rapids, but the rates the railway could charge on the portage railway were sharply restricted by law. The D.P.&A.N., owners of the Regulator, were not expected to meet the reduced rates of the Union Pacific, due to having the pledges of numerous merchants of The Dalles to place their patronage with Regulator, no matter how low the UP rates might go.

== Wrecked at Cascades ==
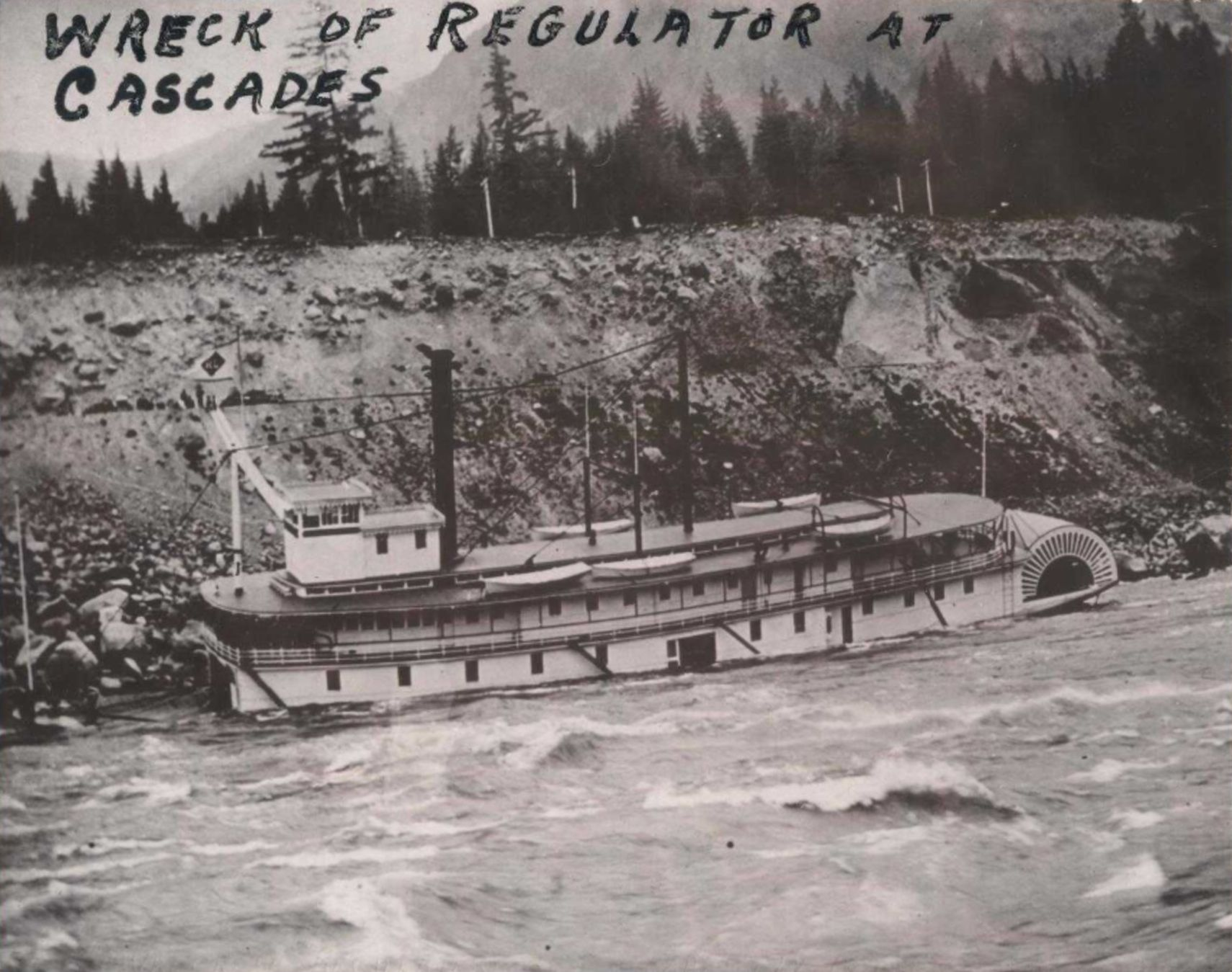
Wrecked at the Cascades Rapids, July 12, 1898.

At about noon on July 12, 1898, Regulator was wrecked just downstream from the locks at the Cascades Rapids. The wreck occurred when the Sarah Dixon at reached the locks, and was waiting for Regulator to enter, as the two vessels usually locked together. Regulator attempted to enter the lower lock, but could not do so because of the high winds.

Regulator backed down river to make another try, but in doing so, the boat was caught by a gust of wind and blown into the rapids on the south side of the river. The boat hit a rock, which punch a hole in the hull. Eventually the steamer was sunk up to the level of the stateroom windows. On board at the time were 160 passengers and a large amount of freight, including some teams of horses. The passengers and some of the freight were landed on the Oregon shore.

Salvage of Regulator required removal of its machinery, which had begun by July 19, 1898. Regulator was still stranded on August 6, 1898. Reportedly the company had secured 50 empty oil drums, with the plan of shoving them into the sunken hull, displacing the water inside, and floating the steamer so it could be taken downriver to Portland for repair. However, work was still being done on the boat at the locks on September 1, when the DP&AN's general agent, W.C. Allaway, went to the site to superintend the work.

On September 2, 1898, the Sarah Dixon was able to tow Regulator into the Cascade Locks, where, on the next day, the boat was laying as if in a drydock. Temporary boat ways had been built under the steam as it lay alongside the shore. However, when launching the vessel, a piece of one of the temporary ship ways broke loose and punctured the hull, so that it flooded again once it entered the water, leaving the boat laying over on its side. Refloating it again was thought to take another 150 barrels.

It was thought that the hull might have to be replaced but the cabin structure was still in good condition and could be reused. The plan in early September was to place 200 empty oil drums into the hold, and thereby float the vessel either to The Dalles or Portland for more through repair.

== Reconstruction ==
Eventually Regulator was returned to The Dalles, where it was rebuilt with a larger and heavier hull. Originally the hull had been 152 feet long, and the gross tonnage was 434. After reconstruction, the hull was 157 feet long, and the gross tonnage was 508.

By February 1899 the reconstructed boat was ready for inspection by U.S. government steamboat inspectors from Portland. On the evening of Saturday, February 18, 1899, under 90 pounds steam pressure in the boiler, Regulator was taken on a trial run from The Dalles to Lyle, Oregon. The trial was satisfactory, and the steamer was ready to be placed into service as soon as painting and some minor improvements could be completed. As of March 3, 1899, Regulator was returned to regular service on runs between The Dalles and Portland.

== Rescue of Dalles City ==
On January 10, 1905, the stern-wheel steamer Dalles City struck a rock near Stevenson, Washington. With a large hole in the hull, Dalles City was beached. Regulator took off 70 passengers from Dalles City and carried them on to their destination.

== Destruction by fire ==
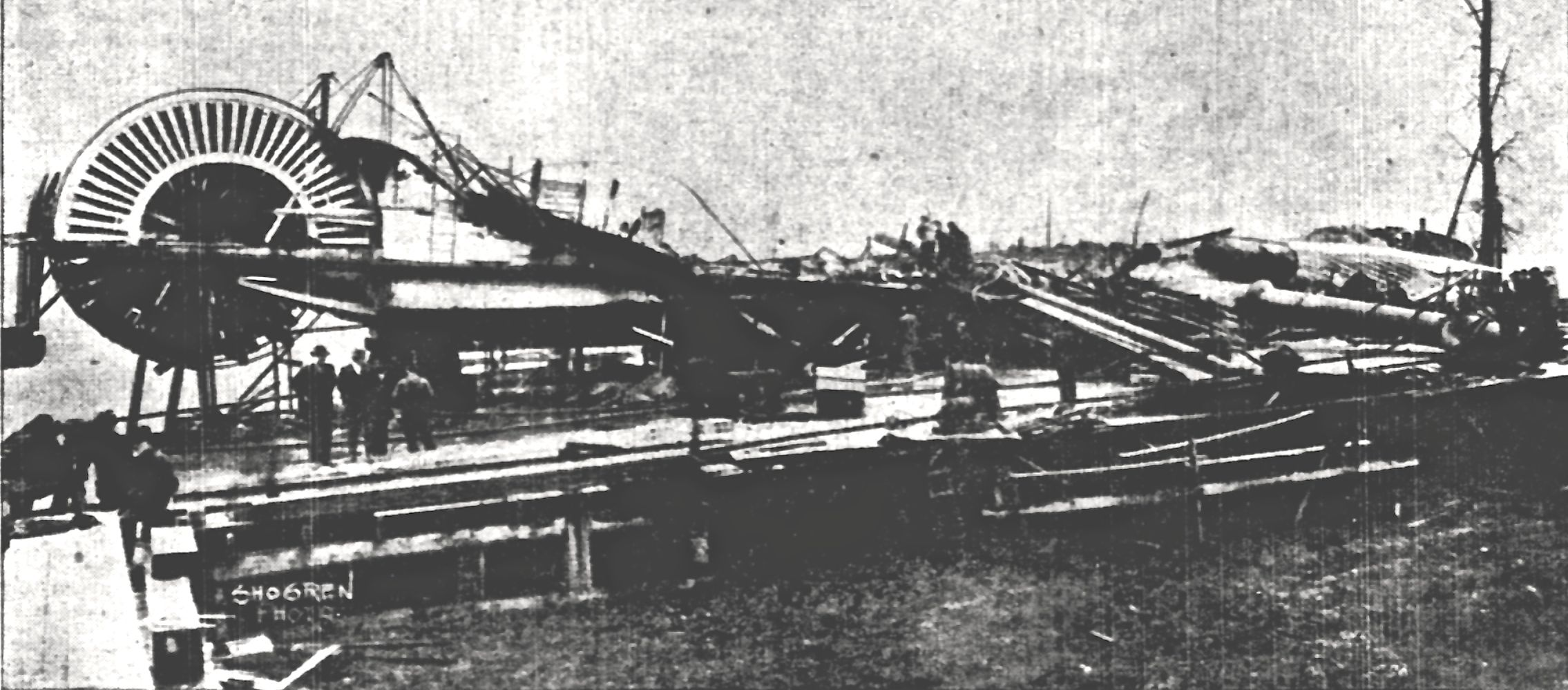
Regulator after explosion and fire, January 25, 1906.

On January 24, 1906, Regulator was on the ways of the St. Johns Shipbuilding Company, in St. Johns, Oregon, having been hauled out about two weeks before for annual maintenance work in preparation for going on the steamer's usual summer run between Portland and The Dalles, Oregon. At 1:20 p.m. there was an explosion, followed by a fire, which killed two crewman, injured a number more, and destroyed the vessel. The cause of the explosion was not immediately known, but appeared to originate with an oil tank on which the two men who were killed, engineer De Monte W. Wade and fireman Merrill B. Stayton, were working.

Wade and Stayton were in the process of connecting the right and left oil tanks, in preparation for which they had drilled holes in both tanks. Suddenly a huge explosion occurred in the forward part of the steamer, and the vessel took fire. Eighteen ship carpenters and labors were at work on the vessel at the time, as well as five dockhands under the supervision of Capt. E.C. Alden.

Chief Engineer F.F. Smith was also on board. All had to leap from the vessel on to the mud flat below the repair ways, and run for safety. One carpenter, Daniel Reid, had been standing near the exploding oil tank, and he was splattered with burning oil. Severely burned about the head, Reid was taken to Good Samitarian Hospital, where his prospects for recovery were reported to have been good.

Engineer Smith saved the life of a watchman, who had been asleep in a cabin on the upper deck, by breaking down the jammed door with a timber.

The explosion was so severe that the charred body of fireman Stayton was blown through the hull. According to one witness, a carpenter who had been just about to board the vessel when the explosion occurred:

The inside of the steamer appeared to be a roaring furnace, and then at once the flames began to break out along the entire upper works

There were about six barrels of fuel oil in the forward oil tanks, which held a total of about 78 gallons.

The St. Johns fire company fought the fire until the city fireboat, the George H. Williams arrived, which, under Captain Whitcomb, took 28 minutes to proceed downriver to the fire scene from the time it received the alarm.

Wade was 27 years old and the sole support of his widowed mother. He was a member of the fraternal benefit society Woodmen of the World. Stayton had come from a family of steamboat men. His father built the sternwheeler Nestor and his brother was a steamboat captain.

=== Salvage of components ===
The engine and machinery from Regulator were installed in a new steamer, the Weown, launched in 1907.

== Photograph links ==
- Historic Hood River, image 1216 Steamer Regulator at dock at Hood River, Oregon, circa 1900. Details of cargo loading and dock procedure can be seen.
- Washington State Historical Society Image 1996.69.4.1 Steamer Regulator wrecked at the Cascades, just downriver from the locks, on July 12, 1898. View is looking east (upriver).
- Oregon Digital, image WCPA 162C-3 Regulator entering Cascade Locks.
