= Manzanillo International Terminal =

Location of Manzanillo International Terminal

Manzanillo International Terminal (abbreviation: MIT, UN/LOCODE: PAMIT) is located east of the Atlantic opening of the Panama Canal on Manzanillo Bay, Colón Province, Panama.

MIT is a distribution center for cargo destined for cities within Panama and nearby countries in Central America and the Caribbean. It is one of the largest container transshipment terminals in the region and has direct access into the Colón Free Trade Zone (CFZ). MIT, has multimodal operations including container input and output from rail, vessel and gate operations.

== History ==
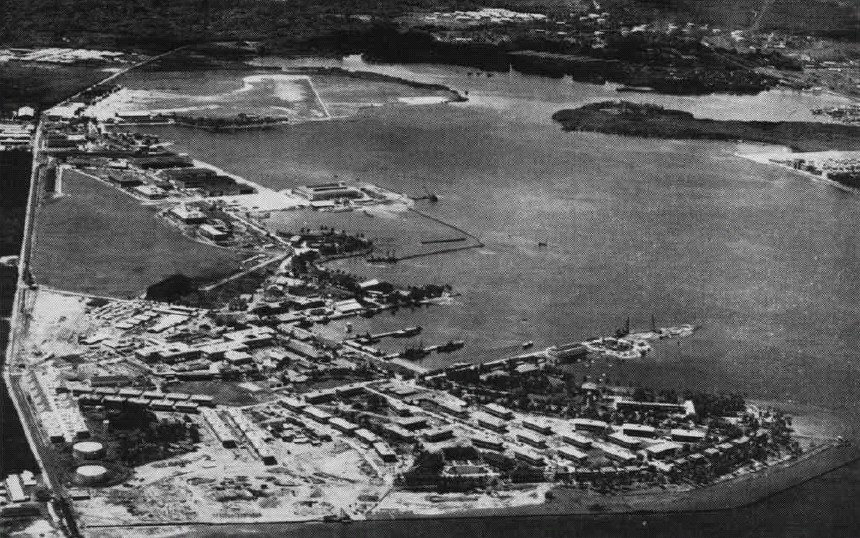
Aerial view of the U.S. Naval Station Coco Solo in 1941

The project area, known as South Coco Solo, was a US Navy seaplane base during the World War II era. The base reverted to Panama under the Torrijos–Carter Treaties of 1977.

During the 1980s, the area was used as a storage facility and distribution center for vehicles for Latin America. To avoid the costs and logistics associated with moving cars to and from Cristóbal, it was decided to build a roll-on/roll-off (RORO) berth at the distribution and storage facility and thereby directly import and export vehicles on site. Thus, the original concept of MIT was born.

By August 1993, with the entry of the multinational SSA Marine, the original RORO berth concept grew into a project to create a world-class container transshipment facility equipped with over 1,200 meters of berth, ship-to-shore gantry cranes, and modern terminal management computer systems. The Atlantic terminus of the re-built Panama Canal Railway was constructed nearby.

MIT began operations on April 16, 1995.

== Geographical Information ==
- MIT's geographical position is 9°21′43″N 79°52′56″W.
- The access channel is 3.0 kilometers from sea buoy.
- The breakwater opening is 200 meters wide, and the access channel has a depth of 14.0 meters.
- The turning basin diameter is 600 meters.

== Storage ==
The terminal's total area is 520,000 square meters, with a container storage capacity of 37,000 TEU, and a container repair yard with 15,000 square meters, including 1,300 square meters of undercover repair facility and connections for 1,145 refrigerated containers.

== Berthing ==
- Main berth: 1,240 meters of contiguous container berth with a depth of 14 meters alongside
- Extra berth: 400 meters of container berth with a depth of 14 meters alongside
- Ro-ro berth: 300-meter "Mediterranean-style" ro-ro berth with a depth of 12.5 meters alongside

All berths are 2.5 meters above MSL (mean sea level). Tide variance is 30 centimeters.

== Government ==
Panama’s Quarantine and Customs departments have offices at MIT and can register clearances on MIT’s Mainsail information system. MIT is a phyto-zoosanitary zone certified by Panama’s agriculture department and can handle sensitive agricultural products.

== Awards ==
The United Kingdom’s Containerisation International named MIT one of the world’s ten most efficient ports, and the terminal has been recognized three times as the "Best Container Terminal in the Caribbean" by the Caribbean Shipping Association.
