= Columbia River =

River in the Pacific Northwest of North America

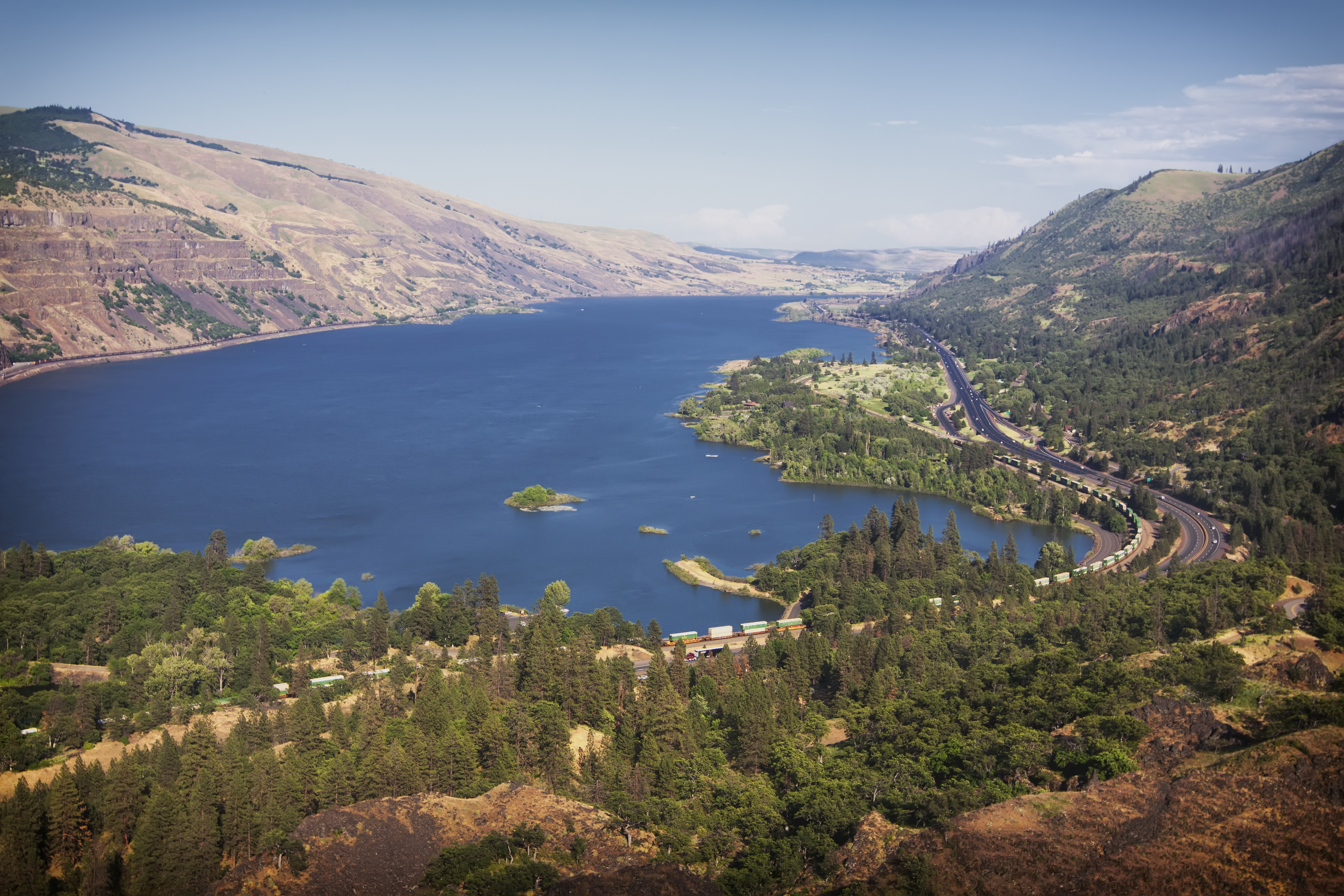
- Columbia River from Rowena Crest with Interstate 84 on the right

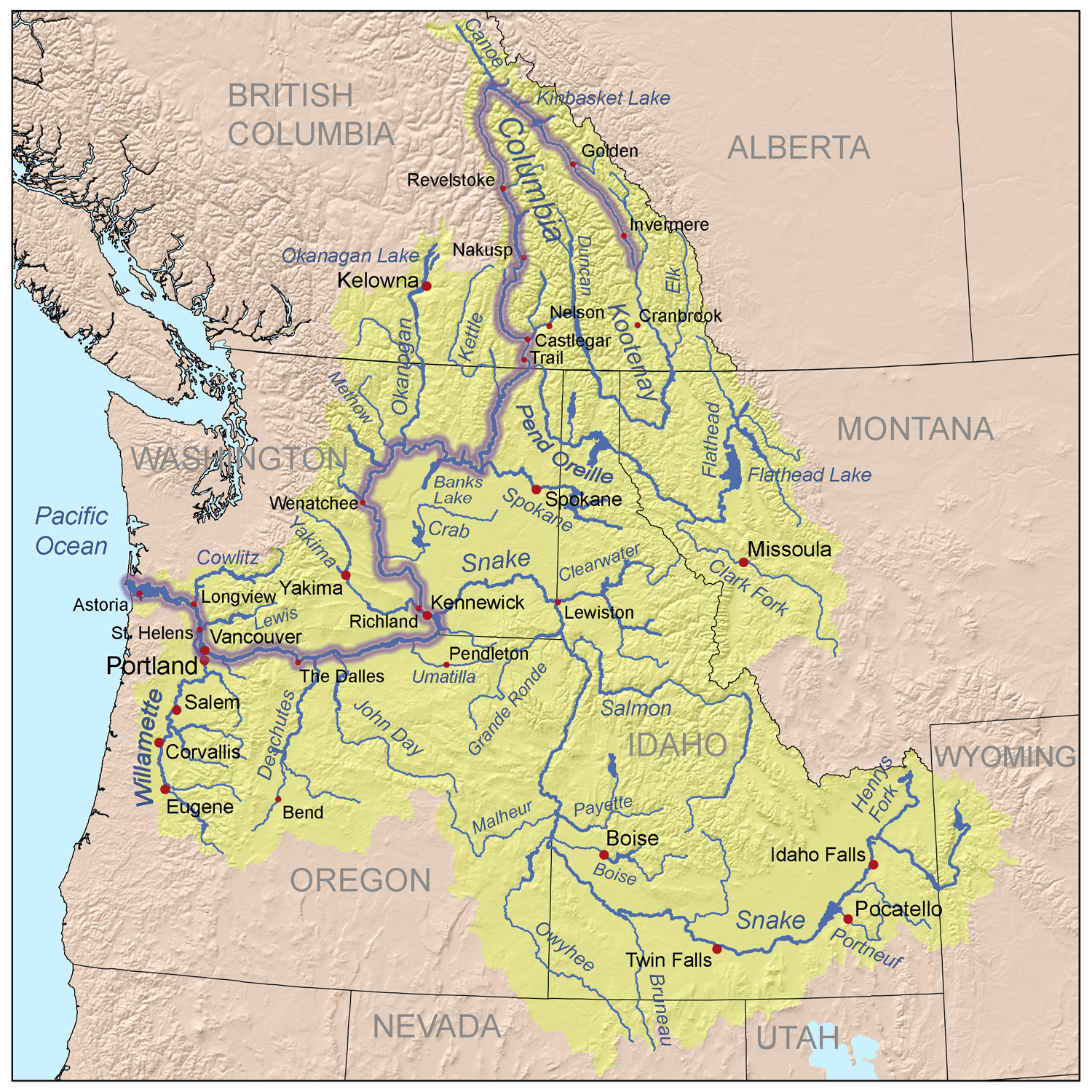
- Columbia River drainage basin
- Etymology: Captain Robert Gray's ship, Columbia Rediviva
- Nicknames: Big River, the River of the West, River Oregon
- Native name: Wimahl (Chinook); Nchʼi-Wàna (Yakama); swahʼnetkʼqhu (Sinixt)

Location
- Country: Canada, United States
- Province: British Columbia
- State: Washington, Oregon
- Cities: Revelstoke, BC, Castlegar, BC, Trail, BC, Wenatchee, WA, East Wenatchee, WA, Tri-Cities, WA, The Dalles, OR, Hood River, OR, Portland, OR, Vancouver, WA, Longview, WA, Astoria, OR

Physical characteristics
- Source: Columbia Lake
  - location: British Columbia, Canada
  - coordinates: 50°13′35″N 115°51′05″W
  - elevation: 2,690 ft (820 m)
- Mouth: Pacific Ocean, at Clatsop County, Oregon / Pacific County, Washington
  - coordinates: 46°14′39″N 124°3′29″W
  - elevation: 0 ft (0 m)
- Length: 1,243 mi (2,000 km)
- Basin size: 258,000 mi^{2} (670,000 km^{2})
- Discharge
  - location: Astoria (near mouth)
  - average: (Period: 1951–1980)265,000 cu ft/s (7,500 m^{3}/s) (Period: 1969–2023)234,700 cu ft/s (6,650 m^{3}/s)
- Discharge
  - location: Port Westward
  - average: (Period: 1969–2023)233,700 cu ft/s (6,620 m^{3}/s)
  - minimum: 63,600 cu ft/s (1,800 m^{3}/s)(Year: 2001)
  - maximum: 864,000 cu ft/s (24,500 m^{3}/s)(Year: 1996)
- Discharge
  - location: The Dalles
  - average: (Period: 1879–2023)188,500 cu ft/s (5,340 m^{3}/s)
  - minimum: 12,100 cu ft/s (340 m^{3}/s)(Year: 1968)
  - maximum: 1,240,000 cu ft/s (35,000 m^{3}/s)(Year: 1894)
- Discharge
  - location: Priest Rapids Dam
  - average: (1960–2023)118,200 cu ft/s (3,350 m^{3}/s)
  - minimum: 36,400 cu ft/s (1,030 m^{3}/s)(Year: 1962)
  - maximum: 533,000 cu ft/s (15,100 m^{3}/s)(Year: 1961)
- Discharge
  - location: United States and Canada international boundary
  - average: (Period: 1938– 2023)99,300 cu ft/s (2,810 m^{3}/s)
  - minimum: 21,200 cu ft/s (600 m^{3}/s)(Year: 1944)
  - maximum: 550,000 cu ft/s (16,000 m^{3}/s)(Year: 1948)

Basin features
- Progression: Pacific Ocean
- River system: Columbia River
- Tributaries
  - left: Spillimacheen River, Beaver River, Illecillewaet River, Incomappleux River, Kootenay River, Pend Oreille River, Spokane River, Crab Creek, Snake River, Walla Walla River, John Day River, Deschutes River, Willamette River
  - right: Kicking Horse River, Blaeberry River, Canoe River, Kettle River, Sanpoil River, Okanogan River, Entiat River, Wenatchee River, Yakima River, Lewis River, Cowlitz River

The Columbia River (Upper Chinook: Wimahl or Wimal; Sahaptin: Nch’i-Wàna or Nchi wana; Sinixt dialect swah'netk'qhu) is the largest river in the Pacific Northwest region of North America. The river forms in the Rocky Mountains of British Columbia, Canada. It flows northwest and then south into the U.S. state of Washington, then turns west to form most of the border between Washington and the state of Oregon before emptying into the Pacific Ocean. The river is 1,243 miles (2,000 kilometers) long, and its largest tributary is the Snake River. Its drainage basin is roughly the size of France and extends into seven states of the United States and one Canadian province. The fourth-largest river in the United States by flow, (Note: Fourth at 7,500 m^{3}/s after Saint Lawrence River that forms the boundary between New York and Canada, Mississippi River which is only 5,897 m^{3}/s where it meets the Ohio, and Ohio River at 7,957 m^{3}/s) the Columbia has the greatest flow of any river into the eastern Pacific.

The Columbia and its tributaries have been central to the region's culture and economy for thousands of years. They have been used for transportation since ancient times, linking the region's many cultural groups. The river system hosts many species of anadromous fish, which migrate between freshwater habitats and the saline waters of the Pacific Ocean. These fish—especially the salmon species—provided the core subsistence for native peoples.

The first documented European discovery of the Columbia River occurred when Spanish explorer Bruno de Heceta sighted the river's mouth in 1775. On May 11, 1792, a private American ship, Columbia Rediviva, under Captain Robert Gray from Boston became the first non-indigenous vessel to enter the river. Later that same year William Robert Broughton of the British Royal Navy commanding HMS Chatham as part of the Vancouver Expedition, navigated past the Oregon Coast Range and 100 mi (160 km) upriver to what is now Vancouver, Washington. In the following decades, fur-trading companies used the Columbia as a key transportation route. Overland explorers entered the Willamette Valley through the scenic but treacherous Columbia River Gorge, and pioneers began to settle the valley in increasing numbers. Steamships along the river linked communities and facilitated trade; the arrival of railroads in the late 19th century, many running along the river, supplemented these links.

Since the late 19th century, public and private sectors have extensively developed the river. To aid ship and barge navigation, locks have been built along the lower Columbia and its tributaries, and dredging has opened, maintained, and enlarged shipping channels. Since the early 20th century, dams have been built across the river for power generation, navigation, irrigation, and flood control. The 14 hydroelectric dams on the Columbia's main stem and many more on its tributaries produce more than 44 percent of total U.S. hydroelectric generation. Production of nuclear power has taken place at two sites along the river. Plutonium for nuclear weapons was produced for decades at the Hanford Site, which is now the most contaminated nuclear site in the United States. These developments have greatly altered river environments in the watershed, mainly through industrial pollution and barriers to fish migration.

== Course ==
The Columbia begins its 1,243-mile (2,000 km) journey in the southern Rocky Mountain Trench in British Columbia (BC). Columbia Lake – 2,690 ft (820 m) above sea level – and the adjoining Columbia Wetlands form the river's headwaters. The trench is a broad, deep, and long glacial valley between the Canadian Rockies and the Columbia Mountains in BC. For its first 200 mi (320 km), the Columbia flows northwest along the trench through Windermere Lake and the town of Invermere, a region known in BC as the Columbia Valley, then northwest to Golden and into Kinbasket Lake. Rounding the northern end of the Selkirk Mountains, the river turns sharply south through a region known as the Big Bend Country, passing through Revelstoke Lake and the Arrow Lakes. Revelstoke, the Big Bend, and the Columbia Valley are collectively referred to in BC parlance as the Columbia Country. Below the Arrow Lakes, the Columbia passes the cities of Castlegar, located at the Columbia's confluence with the Kootenay River, and Trail, two major population centers of the West Kootenay region. The Pend Oreille River joins the Columbia about 0.2 miles (0.3 km) north of the Canada–United States border.

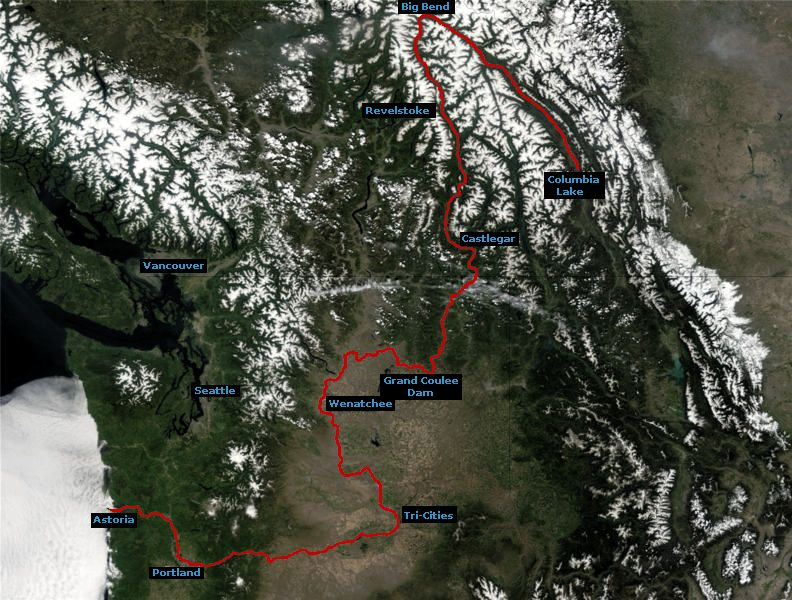
Course of the Columbia River

The Columbia enters eastern Washington flowing south and turning to the west at the Spokane River confluence. It marks the southern and eastern borders of the Colville Indian Reservation and the western border of the Spokane Indian Reservation. The river turns south after the Okanogan River confluence, then southeasterly near the confluence with the Wenatchee River in central Washington. This C-shaped segment of the river is also known as the "Big Bend". During the Missoula Floods 10–15,000 years ago, much of the floodwater took a more direct route south, forming the ancient river bed known as the Grand Coulee. After the floods, the river found its present course, and the Grand Coulee was left dry. The construction of the Grand Coulee Dam in the mid-20th century impounded the river, forming Lake Roosevelt, from which water was pumped into the dry coulee, forming the reservoir of Banks Lake.

The river flows past The Gorge Amphitheatre, a prominent concert venue in the Northwest, then through Priest Rapids Dam, and then through the Hanford Nuclear Reservation. Entirely within the reservation is Hanford Reach, the only U.S. stretch of the river that is completely free-flowing, unimpeded by dams, and not a tidal estuary. The Snake River and Yakima River join the Columbia in the Tri-Cities population center. The Columbia makes a sharp bend to the west at the Washington–Oregon border. The river defines that border for the final 309 mi (497 km) of its journey.

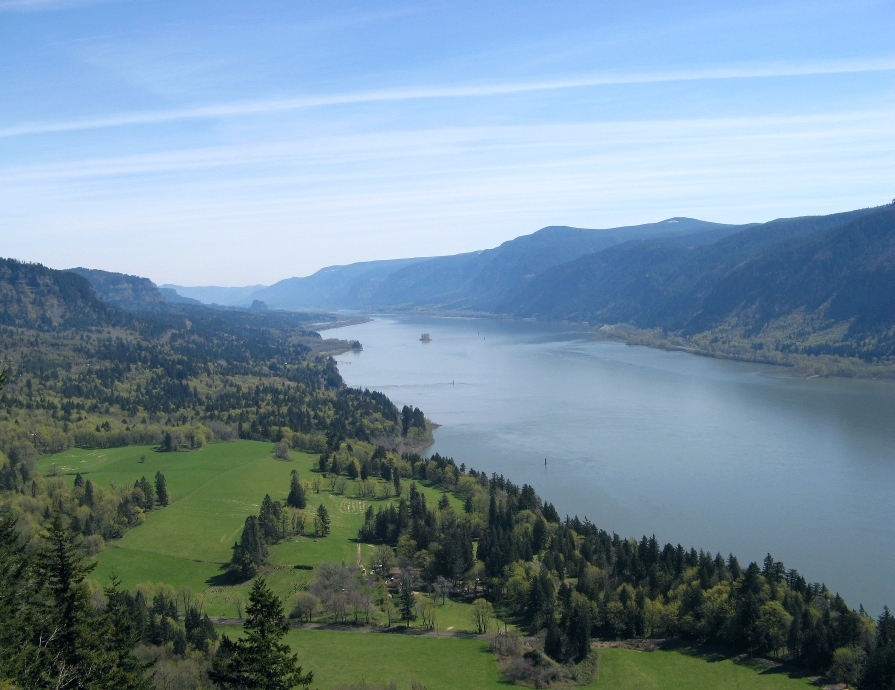
The Columbia River Gorge facing east toward Beacon Rock

The Deschutes River joins the Columbia near The Dalles. Between The Dalles and Portland, the river cuts through the Cascade Range, forming the dramatic Columbia River Gorge. Via the gorge, the Columbia crosses the Cascades at a lower elevation than any other river. The gorge is known for its strong and steady winds, scenery, and its role as a transportation link. The river continues west, bending sharply to the north-northwest near Portland and Vancouver, Washington, at the Willamette River confluence. Here the river slows considerably, dropping sediment that might otherwise form a river delta at the Columbia's mouth. Near Longview, Washington and the Cowlitz River confluence, the river turns west again. The Columbia River empties into the Pacific Ocean just west of Astoria, Oregon, over the Columbia Bar, a shifting sandbar that makes the river's mouth one of the most hazardous stretches of water to navigate in the world. Because of the danger and the many shipwrecks near the mouth, it acquired a reputation as the "Graveyard of Ships".

The Columbia drains an area of about 258,000 mi^{2} (670,000 km^{2}). Its drainage basin covers nearly all of Idaho, large portions of British Columbia, Oregon, and Washington, all of Montana west of the Continental Divide, and small portions of Wyoming, Utah, and Nevada; the total area is similar to the size of France. Roughly 745 mi (1,199 km) of the river's length and 85 percent of its drainage basin are in the US. The Columbia is the twelfth-longest river and has the sixth-largest drainage basin in the United States. In Canada, where the Columbia flows for 498 mi (801 km) and drains 39,700 mi^{2} (103,000 km^{2}), the river ranks 23rd in length, and the Canadian part of its basin ranks 13th in size among Canadian basins. The Columbia shares its name with nearby places, such as British Columbia, as well as with landforms and bodies of water.

== Discharge ==
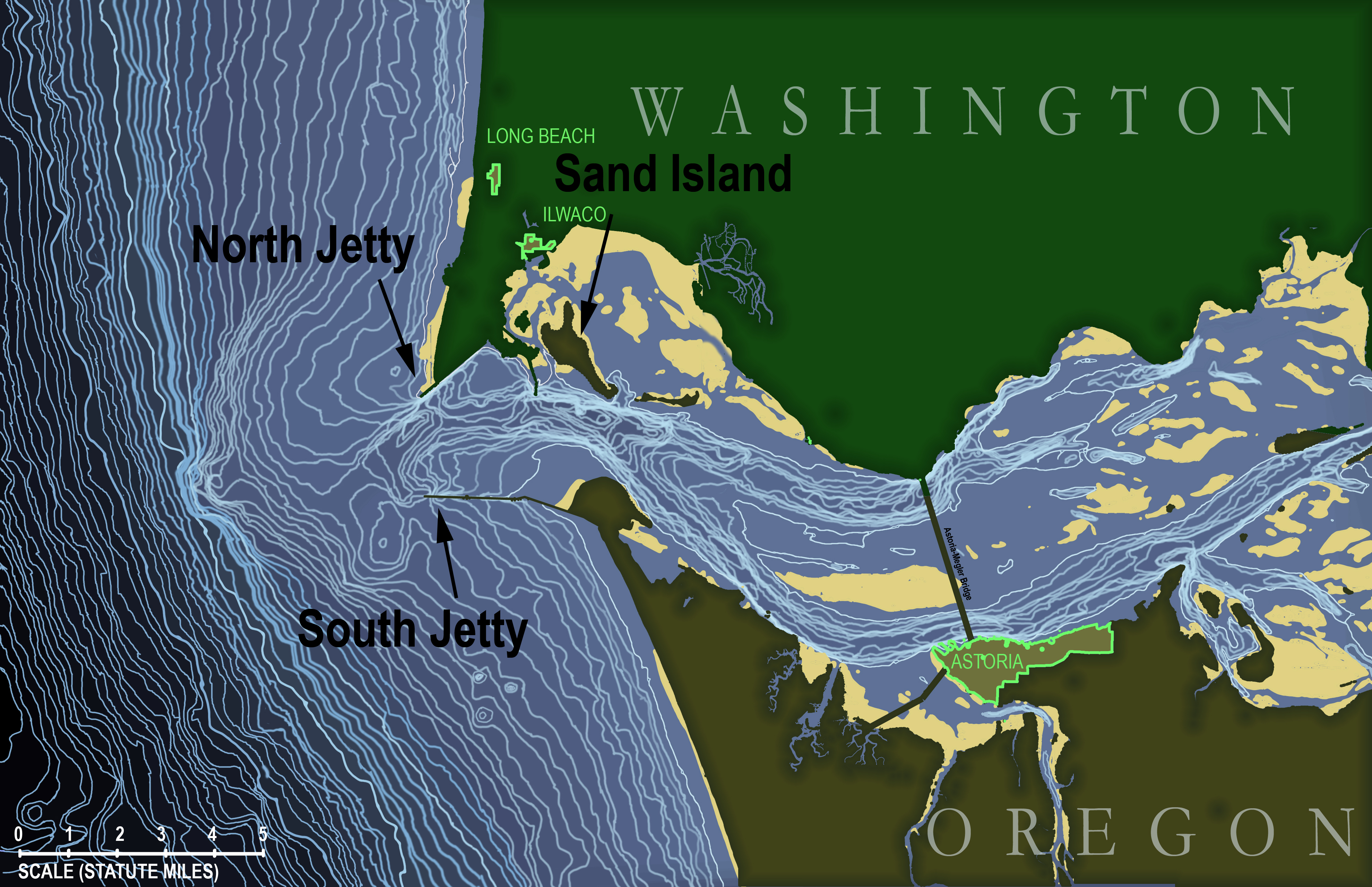
Bathymetric map of the mouth of the Columbia River

With an average flow at the mouth of about 265,000 cu ft/s (7,500 m^{3}/s), the Columbia is the largest river by discharge flowing into the Pacific from the Americas and is the fourth-largest by volume in the U.S. The average flow where the river crosses the international border between Canada and the United States is 2,790 m^{3}/s (99,000 cu ft/s) from a drainage basin of 102,800 km^{2} (39,700 mi^{2}). This amounts to about 15 percent of the entire Columbia watershed. The Columbia's highest recorded flow, measured at The Dalles, was 1,240,000 cu ft/s (35,000 m^{3}/s) in June 1894, before the river was dammed. The lowest flow recorded at The Dalles was 12,100 cu ft/s (340 m^{3}/s) on April 16, 1968, and was caused by the initial closure of the John Day Dam, 28 mi (45 km) upstream. The Dalles is about 190 mi (310 km) from the mouth; the river at this point drains about 237,000 mi^{2} (610,000 km^{2}) or about 91 percent of the total watershed. Flow rates on the Columbia are affected by many large upstream reservoirs, many diversions for irrigation, and, on the lower stretches, reverse flow from the tides of the Pacific Ocean. The National Ocean Service observes water levels at six tide gauges and issues tide forecasts for twenty-two additional locations along the river between the entrance at the North Jetty and the base of Bonneville Dam, its head of tide.

Columbia River at Port Westward, 86 km from the mouth (46°10′55.74″N 123°11′11.0148″W), 1992–2023:
Year	Average discharge (m^{3}/s)
2024	5,253
2023	5,165
2022	6,986
2021	5,397
2020	5,839
2019	5,386
2018	7,221
2017	8,795
2016	6,343
2015	5,862
2014	7,280
2013	6,963
2012	8,481
2011	8,852
2010	5,847
2009	5,998
2008	6,652

(continues)
Year	Average discharge (m^{3}/s)
2007	6,524
2006	6,830
2005	5,213
2004	5,505
2003	5,913
2002	6,230
2001	3,964
2000	6,567
1999	8,487
1998	6,943
1997	9,578
1996	9,325
1995	6,315
1994	4,845
1993	6,176
1992	5,179

Columbia River multiannual average discharge:
Location, period	Average discharge (m^{3}/s)
Astoria, 1892–2023	7,134
Port Westward, 1879–2023	7,048
The Dalles, 1879–2023^{*}	5,338
International boundary, 1938–2023	2,812

^{*}1858–1899: 6,280 m^{3}/s

== Geology ==
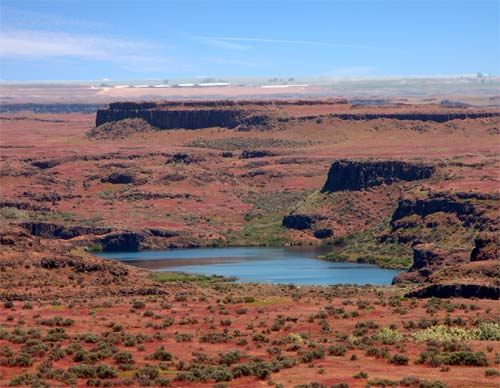
Drumheller Channels, part of the Channeled Scablands formed by the Missoula Floods

When the rifting of Pangaea, due to the process of plate tectonics, pushed North America away from Europe and Africa and into the Panthalassic Ocean (ancestor to the modern Pacific Ocean), the Pacific Northwest was not part of the continent. As the North American continent moved westward, the Farallon Plate subducted under its western margin. As the plate subducted, it carried along island arcs which were accreted to the North American continent, resulting in the creation of the Pacific Northwest between 150 and 90 million years ago. The general outline of the Columbia Basin was not complete until between 60 and 40 million years ago, but it lay under a large inland sea later subject to uplift. Between 50 and 20 million years ago, from the Eocene through the Miocene eras, tremendous volcanic eruptions frequently modified much of the landscape traversed by the Columbia. The lower reaches of the ancestral river passed through a valley near where Mount Hood later arose. Carrying sediments from erosion and erupting volcanoes, it built a 2-mile (3.2 km) thick delta that underlies the foothills on the east side of the Coast Range near Vernonia in northwestern Oregon. Between 17 million and 6 million years ago, huge outpourings of flood basalt lava covered the Columbia Plateau and forced the lower Columbia into its present course. The modern Cascade Range began to uplift 5 to 4 million years ago. Cutting through the uplifting mountains, the Columbia River significantly deepened the Columbia River Gorge.

The river and its drainage basin experienced some of the world's greatest known catastrophic floods toward the end of the last ice age. The periodic rupturing of ice dams at Glacial Lake Missoula resulted in the Missoula Floods, with discharges exceeding the combined flow of all the other rivers in the world, dozens of times over thousands of years. While the exact number of floods is unknown, geologists have documented at least 40; evidence suggests that they occurred between about 19,000 and 13,000 years ago.

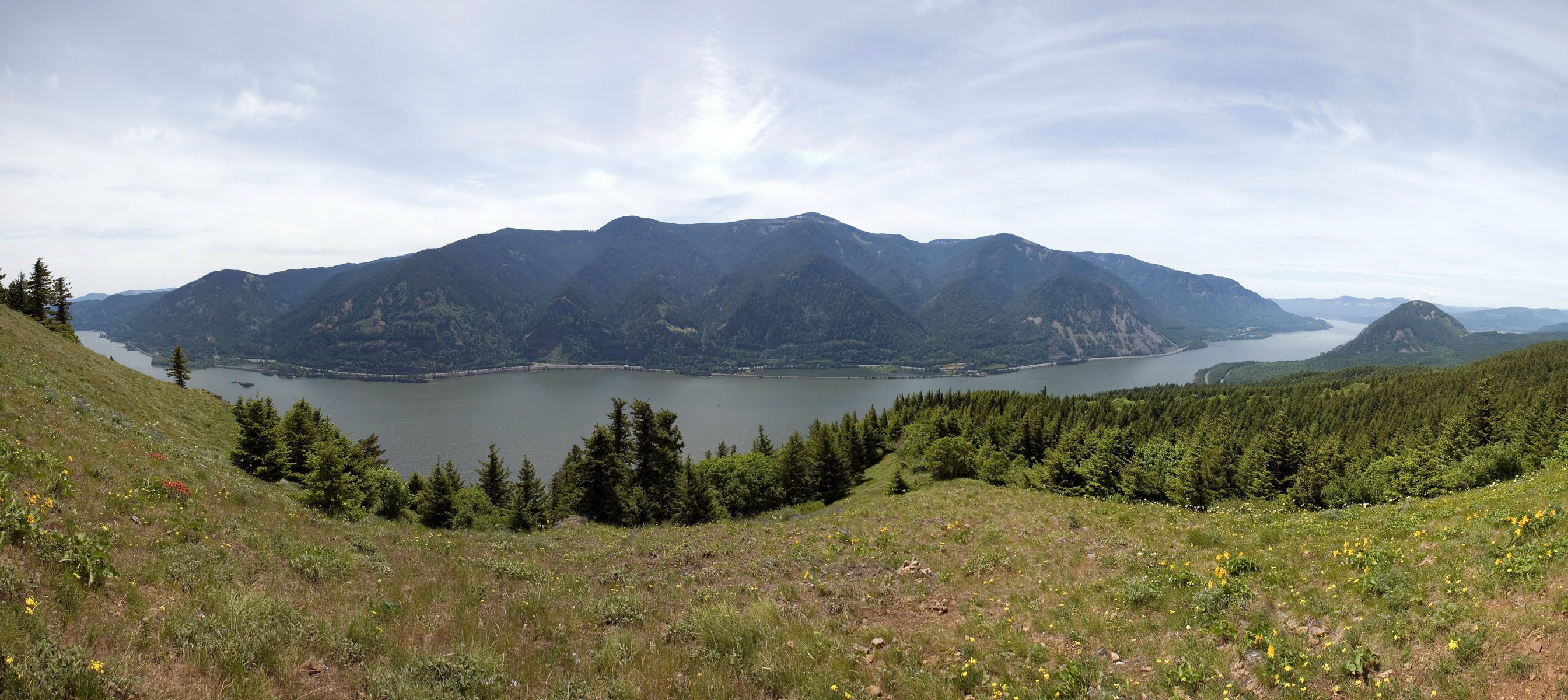
Panoramic view of Columbia River Gorge from Dog Mountain in Washington

The floodwaters rushed across eastern Washington, creating the channeled scablands, which are a complex network of dry canyon-like channels, or coulees that are often braided and sharply gouged into the basalt rock underlying the region's deep topsoil. Numerous flat-topped buttes with rich soil stand high above the chaotic scablands. Constrictions at several places caused the floodwaters to pool into large temporary lakes, such as Lake Lewis, in which sediments were deposited. Water depths have been estimated at 1,000 feet (300 m) at Wallula Gap and 400 feet (120 m) over modern Portland, Oregon. Sediments were also deposited when the floodwaters slowed in the broad flats of the Quincy, Othello, and Pasco Basins. The floods' periodic inundation of the lower Columbia Plateau deposited rich sediments; 21st-century farmers in the Willamette Valley "plow fields of fertile Montana soil and clays from Washington's Palouse".

Over the last several thousand years a series of large landslides have occurred on the north side of the Columbia River Gorge, sending massive amounts of debris south from Table Mountain and Greenleaf Peak into the gorge near the present site of Bonneville Dam. The most recent and significant is known as the Bonneville Slide, which formed a massive earthen dam, filling 3.5 miles (5.6 km) of the river's length. Various studies have placed the date of the Bonneville Slide anywhere between 1060 and 1760 AD; the idea that the landslide debris present today was formed by more than one slide is relatively recent and may explain the large range of estimates. It has been suggested that if the later dates are accurate there may be a link with the 1700 Cascadia earthquake. The pile of debris resulting from the Bonneville Slide blocked the river until rising water finally washed away the sediment. It is not known how long it took the river to break through the barrier; estimates range from several months to several years. Much of the landslide's debris remained, forcing the river about 1.5 miles (2.4 km) south of its previous channel and forming the Cascade Rapids. In 1938, the construction of Bonneville Dam inundated the rapids as well as the remaining trees that could be used to refine the estimated date of the landslide.

In 1980, the eruption of Mount St. Helens deposited large amounts of sediment in the lower Columbia, temporarily reducing the depth of the shipping channel by 26 feet (7.9 m).

== Indigenous peoples ==
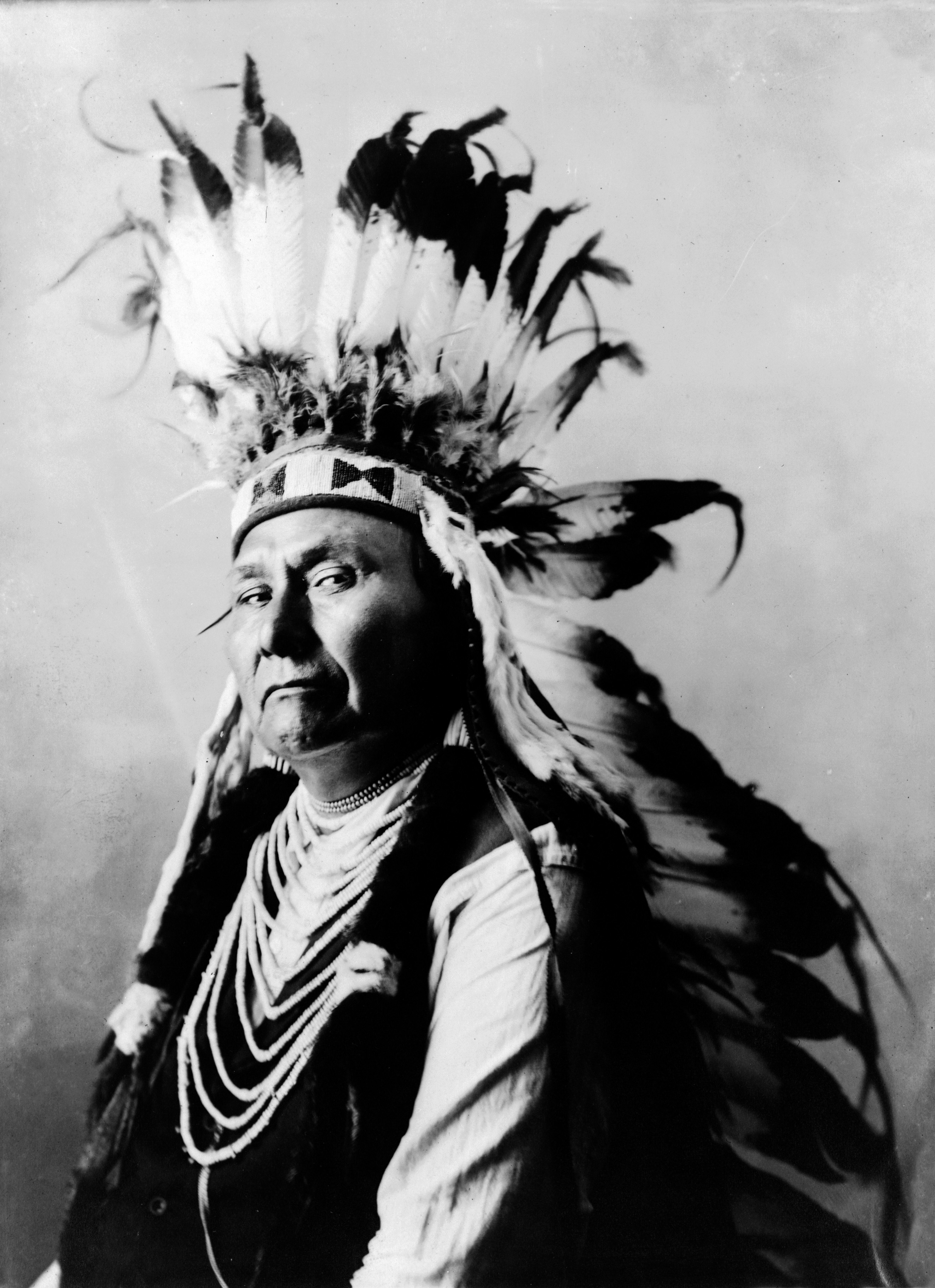
Chief Joseph of the Nez Perce people

Humans have inhabited the Columbia's watershed for more than 15,000 years, with a transition to a sedentary lifestyle based mainly on salmon starting about 3,500 years ago. In 1962, archaeologists found evidence of human activity dating back 11,230 years at the Marmes Rockshelter, near the confluence of the Palouse and Snake rivers in eastern Washington. In 1996 the skeletal remains of a 9,000-year-old prehistoric man (dubbed Kennewick Man) were found near Kennewick, Washington. The discovery rekindled debate in the scientific community over the origins of human habitation in North America and sparked a protracted controversy over whether the scientific or Native American community was entitled to possess and/or study the remains.

Many different Native Americans and First Nations peoples have a historical and continuing presence on the Columbia. South of the Canada–US border, the Colville, Spokane, Coeur d'Alene, Yakama, Wanapum, Nez Perce, Cayuse, Palus, Umatilla, Cowlitz, and the Confederated Tribes of Warm Springs live along the US stretch. Along the upper Snake River and Salmon River, the Shoshone Bannock tribes are present. The Sinixt or Lakes people lived on the lower stretch of the Canadian portion, while above that the Shuswap people (Secwepemc in their own language) reckon the whole of the upper Columbia east to the Rockies as part of their territory. The Canadian portion of the Columbia Basin outlines the traditional homelands of the Canadian Kootenay–Ktunaxa.

The Chinook tribe, which is not federally recognized, who live near the lower Columbia River, call it Wimahl or Wimal in the Upper Chinook (Kiksht) language, and it is Nch’i-Wàna or Nchi wana to the Sahaptin (Ichishkíin Sɨ́nwit)-speaking peoples of its middle course in present-day Washington. The river is known as swah'netk'qhu by the Sinixt people, who live in the area of the Arrow Lakes in the river's upper reaches in Canada. All three terms essentially mean "the big river".

Oral histories describe the formation and destruction of the Bridge of the Gods, a land bridge that connected the Oregon and Washington sides of the river in the Columbia River Gorge. The bridge, which aligns with geological records of the Bonneville Slide, was described in some stories as the result of a battle between gods, represented by Mount Adams and Mount Hood, in their competition for the affection of a goddess, represented by Mount St. Helens. Native American stories about the bridge differ in their details but agree in general that the bridge permitted increased interaction between tribes on the north and south sides of the river.

Horses, originally acquired from Spanish New Mexico, spread widely via native trade networks, reaching the Shoshone of the Snake River Plain by 1700. The Nez Perce, Cayuse, and Flathead people acquired their first horses around 1730. Along with horses came aspects of the emerging plains culture, such as equestrian and horse training skills, greatly increased mobility, hunting efficiency, trade over long distances, intensified warfare, the linking of wealth and prestige to horses and war, and the rise of large and powerful tribal confederacies. The Nez Perce and Cayuse kept large herds and made annual long-distance trips to the Great Plains for bison hunting, adopted the plains culture to a significant degree, and became the main conduit through which horses and the plains culture diffused into the Columbia River region. Other peoples acquired horses and aspects of the plains culture unevenly. The Yakama, Umatilla, Palus, Spokane, and Coeur d'Alene maintained sizable herds of horses and adopted some of the plains cultural characteristics, but fishing and fish-related economies remained important. Less affected groups included the Molala, Klickitat, Wenatchi, Okanagan, and Sinkiuse-Columbia peoples, who owned small numbers of horses and adopted few plains culture features. Some groups remained essentially unaffected, such as the Sanpoil and Nespelem people, whose culture remained centered on fishing.

Natives of the region encountered foreigners at several times and places during the 18th and 19th centuries. European and American vessels explored the coastal area around the mouth of the river in the late 18th century, trading with local natives. The contact would prove devastating to the indigenous Chinookan speaking peoples; a large portion of their population was wiped out by a smallpox epidemic. Canadian explorer Alexander Mackenzie crossed what is now interior British Columbia in 1793. From 1805 to 1806, the Lewis and Clark Expedition entered the Oregon Country along the Clearwater and Snake rivers, and encountered numerous small settlements of natives. Their records recount tales of hospitable traders who were not above stealing small items from the visitors. They also noted brass teakettles, a British musket, and other artifacts that had been obtained in trade with coastal tribes. From the earliest contact with westerners, the natives of the mid- and lower Columbia were not tribal, but instead congregated in social units no larger than a village, and more often at a family level; these units would shift with the season as people moved about, following the salmon catch up and down the river's tributaries.

Sparked by the 1847 Whitman Massacre, a number of violent battles were fought between American settlers and the region's natives. The subsequent wars over Northwest territory, especially the Yakima War, decimated the native population and removed much land from native control. As years progressed, the right of natives to fish along the Columbia became the central issue of contention with the states, commercial fishers, and private property owners. The US Supreme Court upheld fishing rights in landmark cases in 1905 and 1918, as well as the 1974 case United States v. Washington, commonly called the Boldt Decision.

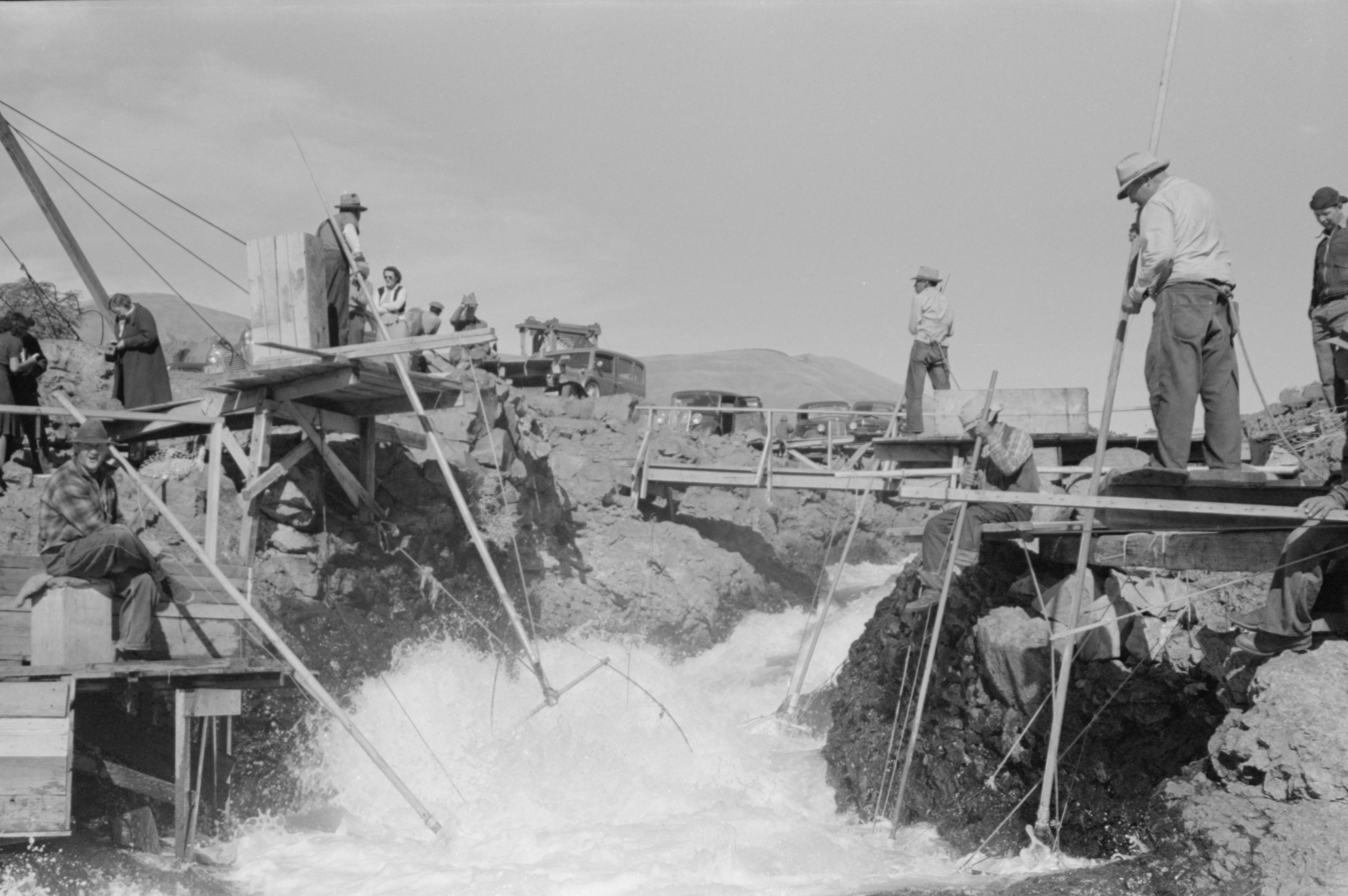
Dipnet fishing at Celilo Falls, 1941

Fish were central to the culture of the region's natives, both as sustenance and as part of their religious beliefs. Natives drew fish from the Columbia at several major sites, which also served as trading posts. Celilo Falls, located east of the modern city of The Dalles, was a vital hub for trade and the interaction of different cultural groups, being used for fishing and trading for 11,000 years. Prior to contact with westerners, villages along this 9-mile (14 km) stretch may have at times had a population as great as 10,000. The site drew traders from as far away as the Great Plains.

The Cascades Rapids of the Columbia River Gorge, and Kettle Falls and Priest Rapids in eastern Washington, were also major fishing and trading sites.

In prehistoric times the Columbia's salmon and steelhead runs numbered an estimated annual average of 10 to 16 million fish. In comparison, the largest run since 1938 was in 1986, with 3.2 million fish entering the Columbia. The annual catch by natives has been estimated at 42 million pounds (19,000 metric tons). The most important and productive native fishing site was located at Celilo Falls, which was perhaps the most productive inland fishing site in North America. The falls were located at the border between Chinookan- and Sahaptian-speaking peoples and served as the center of an extensive trading network across the Pacific Plateau. Celilo was the oldest continuously inhabited community on the North American continent.

Salmon canneries established by white settlers beginning in 1866 had a strong negative impact on the salmon population, and in 1908 US president Theodore Roosevelt observed that the salmon runs were but a fraction of what they had been 25 years prior.

As river development continued in the 20th century, each of these major fishing sites was flooded by a dam, beginning with Cascades Rapids in 1938. The development was accompanied by extensive negotiations between natives and US government agencies. The Confederated Tribes of Warm Springs, a coalition of various tribes, adopted a constitution and incorporated after the 1938 completion of the Bonneville Dam flooded Cascades Rapids; Still, in the 1930s, there were natives who lived along the river and fished year round, moving along with the fish's migration patterns throughout the seasons. The Yakama were slower to do so, organizing a formal government in 1944. In the 21st century, the Yakama, Nez Perce, Umatilla, and Warm Springs tribes all have treaty fishing rights along the Columbia and its tributaries.

In 1957 Celilo Falls was submerged by the construction of the Dalles Dam, and the native fishing community was displaced. The affected tribes received a $26.8 million settlement for the loss of Celilo and other fishing sites submerged by the Dalles Dam. The Confederated Tribes of Warm Springs used part of its $4 million settlement to establish the Kah-Nee-Ta resort south of Mount Hood.

In 1977, 75 indigenous fishermen of the Yakama Tribe were arrested in a federal sting operation which claimed that fishermen were poaching up to 40,000 fish in the Columbia River. Fishermen placed on trial received sentences ranging from six months to five years. The federal government pinned Yakama Tribe member David Sohappy ringleader of the operation. After the trial ended, it was determined that the fish were not poached, but driven away because of harmful chemicals present in the power plant. These harmful chemicals consisted mainly of aluminum. This event is commonly known today as the Salmon Scam.

Shortly after the Salmon Scam, many Columbia River-based indigenous tribes received federally recognized status. The Siletz Tribe was the first to restore its federal recognition in 1977, followed by the Cow Creek Band of the Umpqua Tribe in 1982, the Grand Ronde Tribe in 1983, the Lower Umpqua Tribe, Siuslaw Tribe, and Coos Tribe in 1984, the Klamath Tribe in 1986, and the Coquille Tribe in 1989. While all the aforementioned tribes received federally recognized status, the Chinook Indian Nation had their federal recognition revoked in 2002 by the Bush administration, and are fighting to have it restored.

In 2023, members of the Yakama Nation expressed their dismay for the construction of a Goldendale-based pumped hydroelectric energy storage project. Jeremy Takala of the Yakama Nation embodies Yakama belief on the importance of Columbia River crops to food and medicine, stating "the [Goldendale] project being proposed here, it will definitely impact our life". The Goldendale-pumped hydro storage unit could allow for reused water use in reservoirs, which would be placed on mountainous terrain overlooking the Columbia River. The mountainous terrain where the unit would be placed in is Juniper Point, referred to by the Yakama as Pushpum. Pushpum has rock formations, as well as food and medicine capabilities that are essential to the Yakama. Members of the Yakama tribe wish for consent on the Goldendale project, as opposed to consultation.

== New waves of explorers ==
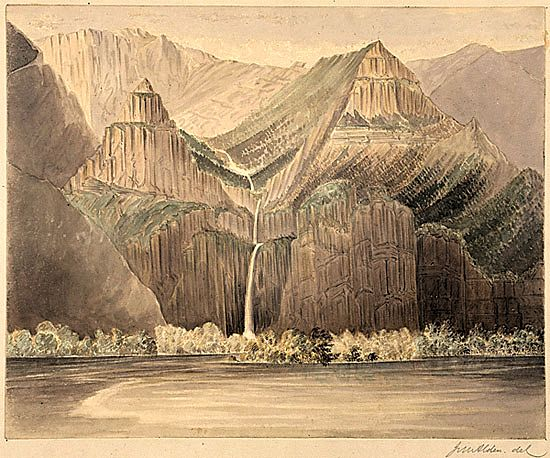
Multnomah Falls, painted by James W. Alden, 1857

Historian Derek Hayes believes that Japanese or Chinese vessels blown off course reached the Northwest Coast long before Europeans—possibly as early as 219 BCE—but the earliest known wreck is from the 19th century.

The Maris Pacifici map published in 1589 features on the west coast of North-America an intriguing resemblance of two major coastline features: the mouth of the Columbia River identified as "Rio Grande" and the delta of the Fraser River labeled "Baia de las isleas". These rivers may have been sighted by European visitors long before official records would confirm nearly 200 years later. In spite of limited evidence of Francis Drake expedition 1579 whereabouts in the Pacific Northwest, Pacific Northwest BC history commentator Sam Bawlf posited that the Ortelius mapped coastal features were a proof that Drake sighted the mouth of the Columbia and the Fraser River delta. The Beeswax wreck proves that Spanish vessels reached the shore by the late-17th century, but if there were any survivors, they failed to send word home to Spain.

In the 18th century, there was strong interest in discovering a Northwest Passage that would permit navigation between the Atlantic (or inland North America) and the Pacific oceans. Many ships in the area, especially those under Spanish and British command, searched the northwest coast for a large river that might connect to Hudson Bay or the Missouri River. The first documented European discovery of the Columbia River was that of Bruno de Heceta, who in 1775 sighted the river's mouth. On the advice of his officers, he did not explore it, as he was short-staffed and the current was strong. He considered it a bay, and called it Ensenada de Asunción (Assumption Cove). Later Spanish maps, based on his sighting, showed a river, labeled Río de San Roque (The Saint Roch River), or an entrance, called Entrada de Hezeta, named for Bruno de Hezeta, who sailed the region. Following Hezeta's reports, British maritime fur trader Captain John Meares searched for the river in 1788 but concluded that it did not exist. He named Cape Disappointment for the non-existent river, not realizing the cape marks the northern edge of the river's mouth.

What happened next would form the basis for decades of both cooperation and dispute between British and American exploration of, and ownership claim to, the region. Royal Navy commander George Vancouver sailed past the mouth in April 1792 and observed a change in the water's color, but he accepted Meares' report and continued on his journey northward. Later that month, Vancouver encountered the American captain Robert Gray at the Strait of Juan de Fuca. Gray reported that he had seen the entrance to the Columbia and had spent nine days trying but failing to enter.

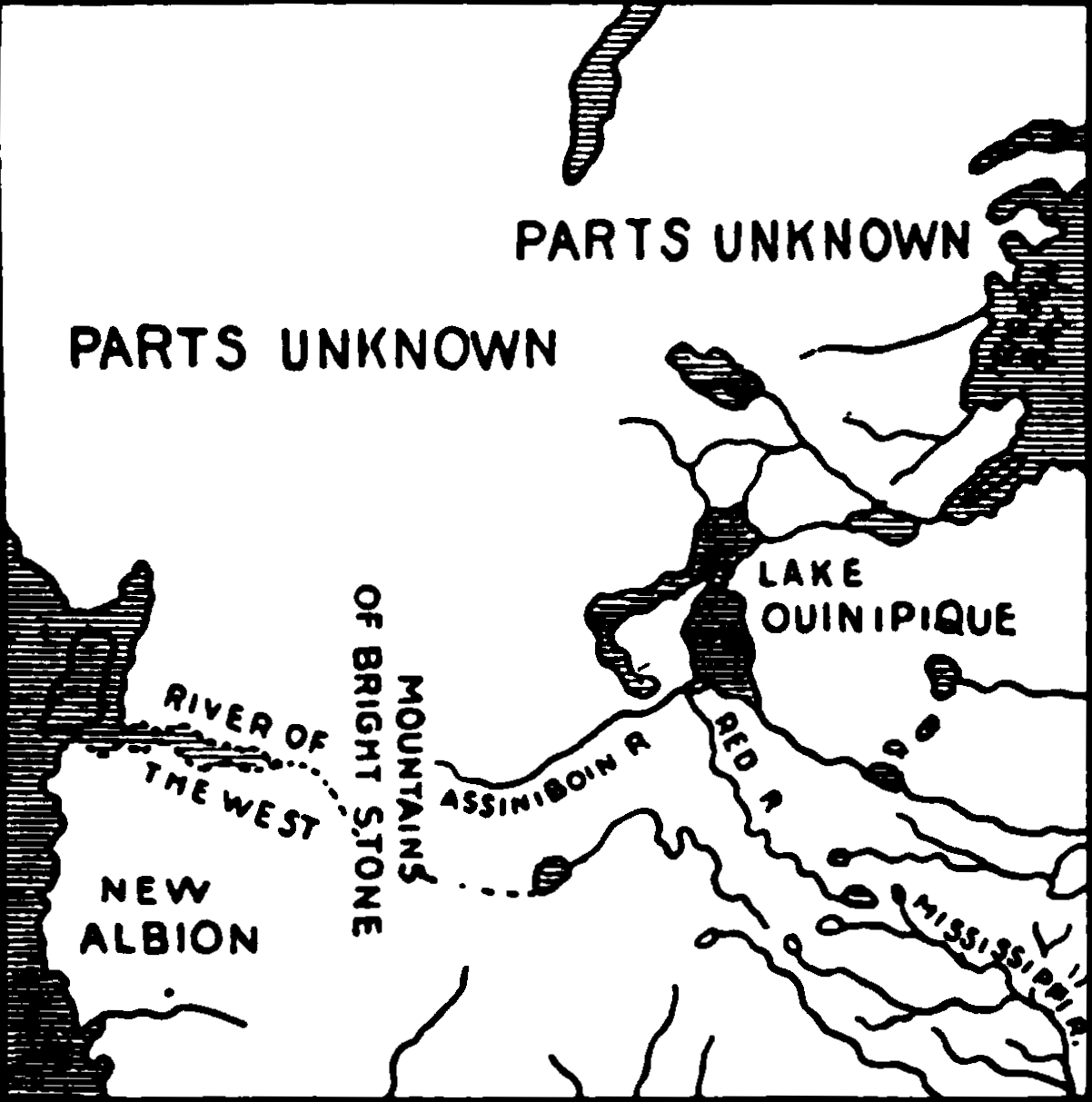
Carver's map from 1778, showing the River of the West, New Albion, Lake Winnipeg, and the Mountains of Bright Stone

On May 12, 1792, Gray returned south and crossed the Columbia Bar, becoming the first known explorer of European descent to enter the river. Gray's fur trading mission had been financed by Boston merchants, who outfitted him with a private vessel named Columbia Rediviva; he named the river after the ship on May 18. Gray spent nine days trading near the mouth of the Columbia, then left without having gone beyond 13 miles (21 km) upstream. The farthest point reached was Grays Bay at the mouth of Grays River. Gray's discovery of the Columbia River was later used by the United States to support its claim to the Oregon Country, which was also claimed by Russia, Great Britain, Spain and other nations.

In October 1792, Vancouver sent Lieutenant William Robert Broughton, his second-in-command, up the river. Broughton got as far as the Sandy River at the western end of the Columbia River Gorge, about 100 miles (160 km) upstream, sighting and naming Mount Hood. Broughton formally claimed the river, its drainage basin, and the nearby coast for Britain. In contrast, Gray had not made any formal claims on behalf of the United States.

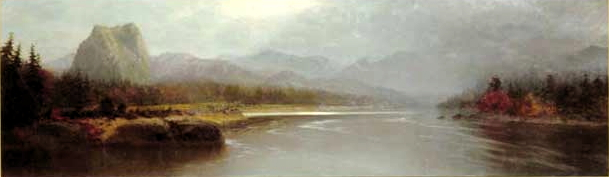
Columbia River, Cascade Mountains, Oregon, (1876) by Vincent Colyer (oil on canvas). Beacon Rock is visible on the left.

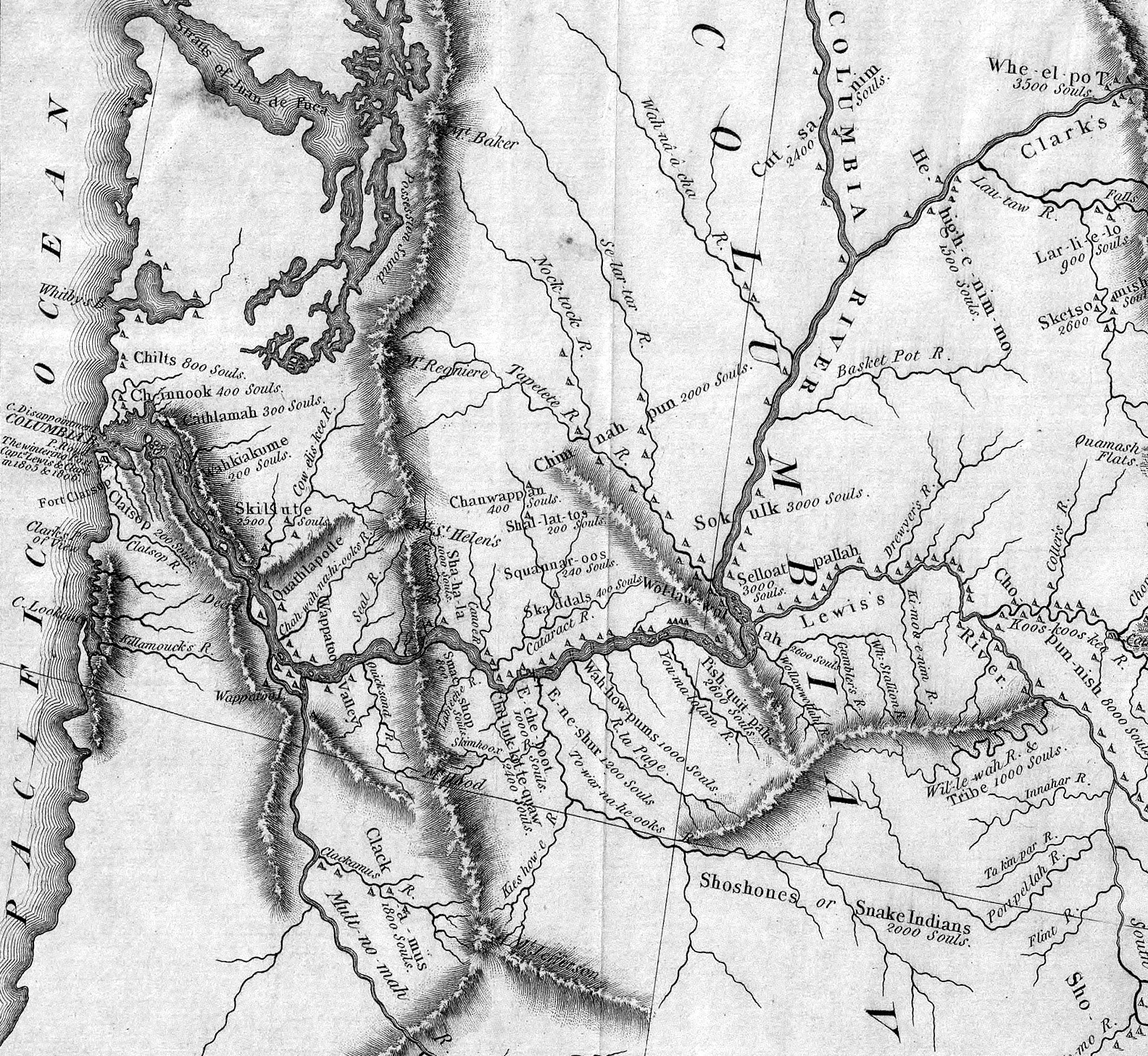
Detail from the Lewis and Clark Expedition map. The Willamette River is shown as the "Multnomah", while the Snake River is "Lewis's River". (See complete map.)

Because the Columbia was at the same latitude as the headwaters of the Missouri River, there was some speculation that Gray and Vancouver had discovered the long-sought Northwest Passage. A 1798 British map showed a dotted line connecting the Columbia with the Missouri. When the American explorers Meriwether Lewis and William Clark charted the vast, unmapped lands of the American West in their overland expedition (1803–1805), they found no passage between the rivers. After crossing the Rocky Mountains, Lewis and Clark built dugout canoes and paddled down the Snake River, reaching the Columbia near the present-day Tri-Cities, Washington. They explored a few miles upriver, as far as Bateman Island, before heading down the Columbia, concluding their journey at the river's mouth and establishing Fort Clatsop, a short-lived establishment that was occupied for less than three months.

Canadian explorer David Thompson, of the North West Company, spent the winter of 1807–08 at Kootanae House near the source of the Columbia at present-day Invermere, BC. Over the next few years he explored much of the river and its northern tributaries. In 1811 he traveled down the Columbia to the Pacific Ocean, arriving at the mouth just after John Jacob Astor's Pacific Fur Company had founded Astoria. On his return to the north, Thompson explored the one remaining part of the river he had not yet seen, becoming the first Euro-descended person to travel the entire length of the river.

In 1825, the Hudson's Bay Company (HBC) established Fort Vancouver on the bank of the Columbia, in what is now Vancouver, Washington, as the headquarters of the company's Columbia District, which encompassed everything west of the Rocky Mountains, north of California, and south of Russian-claimed Alaska. Chief Factor John McLoughlin, a physician who had been in the fur trade since 1804, was appointed superintendent of the Columbia District. The HBC reoriented its Columbia District operations toward the Pacific Ocean via the Columbia, which became the region's main trunk route. In the early 1840s Americans began to colonize the Oregon country in large numbers via the Oregon Trail, despite the HBC's efforts to discourage American settlement in the region. For many the final leg of the journey involved travel down the lower Columbia River to Fort Vancouver. This part of the Oregon Trail, the treacherous stretch from The Dalles to below the Cascades, could not be traversed by horses or wagons (only watercraft, at great risk). This prompted the 1846 construction of the Barlow Road.

In the Treaty of 1818 the United States and Britain agreed that both nations were to enjoy equal rights in Oregon Country for 10 years. By 1828, when the so-called "joint occupation" was renewed indefinitely, it seemed probable that the lower Columbia River would in time become the border between the two nations. For years the Hudson's Bay Company successfully maintained control of the Columbia River and American attempts to gain a foothold were fended off. In the 1830s, American religious missions were established at several locations in the lower Columbia River region. In the 1840s a mass migration of American settlers undermined British control. The Hudson's Bay Company tried to maintain dominance by shifting from the fur trade, which was in decline, to exporting other goods such as salmon and lumber. Colonization schemes were attempted, but failed to match the scale of American settlement. Americans generally settled south of the Columbia, mainly in the Willamette Valley. The Hudson's Bay Company tried to establish settlements north of the river, but nearly all the British colonists moved south to the Willamette Valley. The hope that the British colonists might dilute the American presence in the valley failed in the face of the overwhelming number of American settlers. These developments rekindled the issue of "joint occupation" and the boundary dispute. While some British interests, especially the Hudson's Bay Company, fought for a boundary along the Columbia River, the Oregon Treaty of 1846 set the boundary at the 49th parallel. As part of the treaty, the British retained all areas north of the line while the United States acquired the south. The Columbia River became much of the border between the U.S. territories of Oregon and Washington. Oregon became a U.S. state in 1859, while Washington later entered into the Union in 1889.

By the turn of the 20th century, the difficulty of navigating the Columbia was seen as an impediment to the economic development of the Inland Empire region east of the Cascades. The dredging and dam building that followed would permanently alter the river, disrupting its natural flow but also providing electricity, irrigation, navigability and other benefits to the region.

== Navigation ==
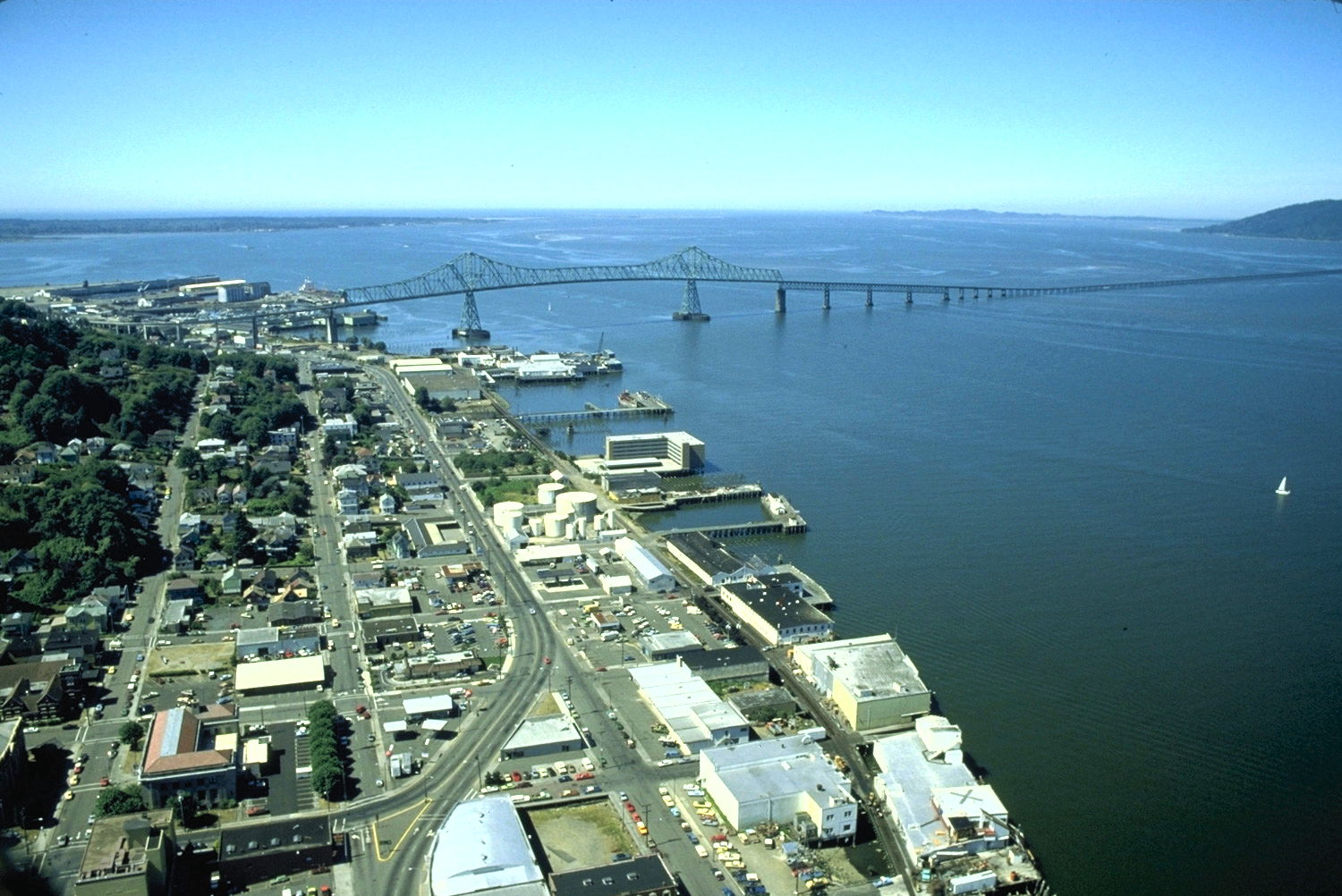
The mouth of the Columbia is just past Astoria, Oregon; ships must navigate the treacherous Columbia Bar (near horizon, not visible in this picture) to enter or exit the river.

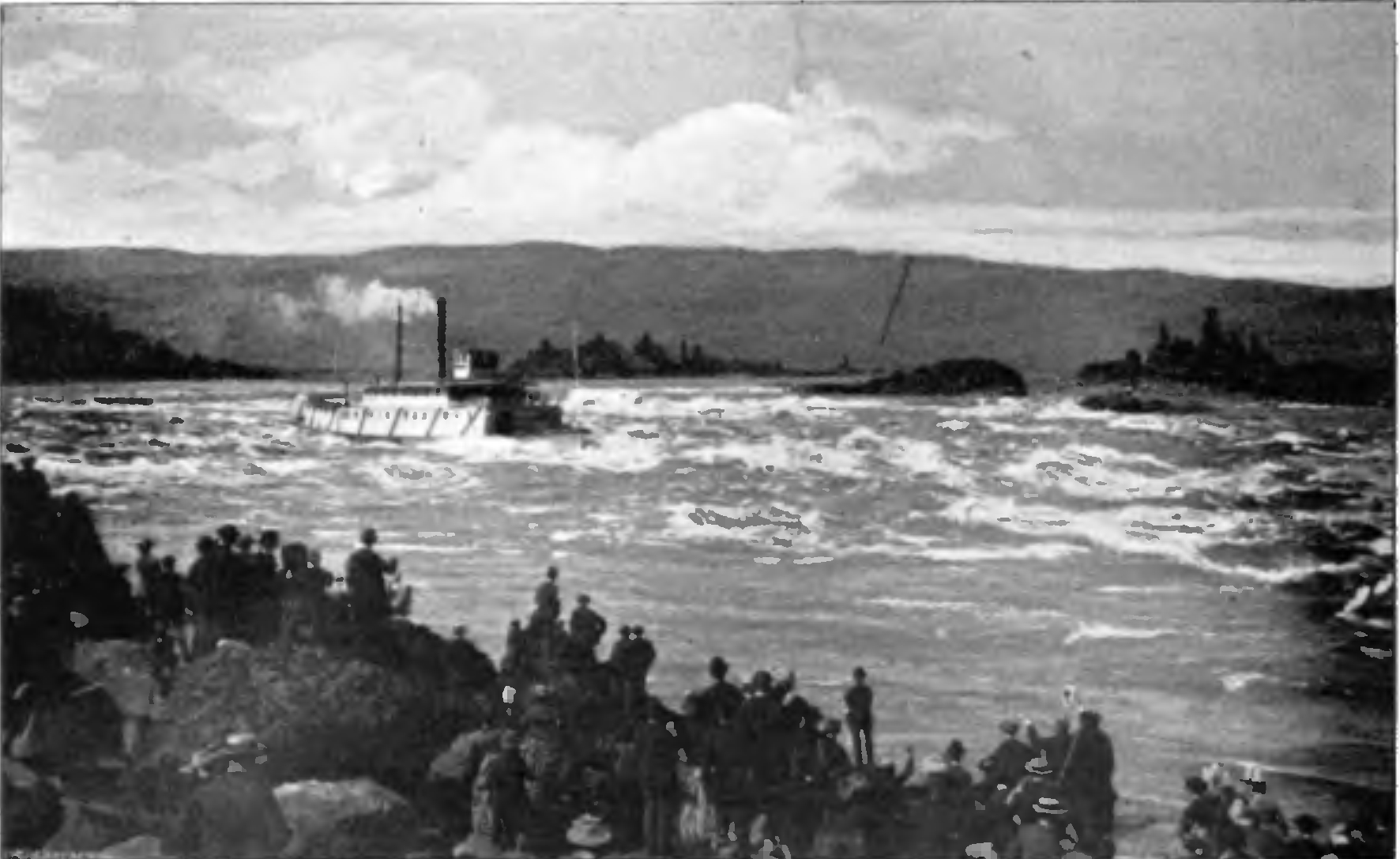
The sternwheeler Hassalo runs the Cascades Rapids, May 26, 1888. The rapids are now submerged under the pool of the Bonneville Dam.

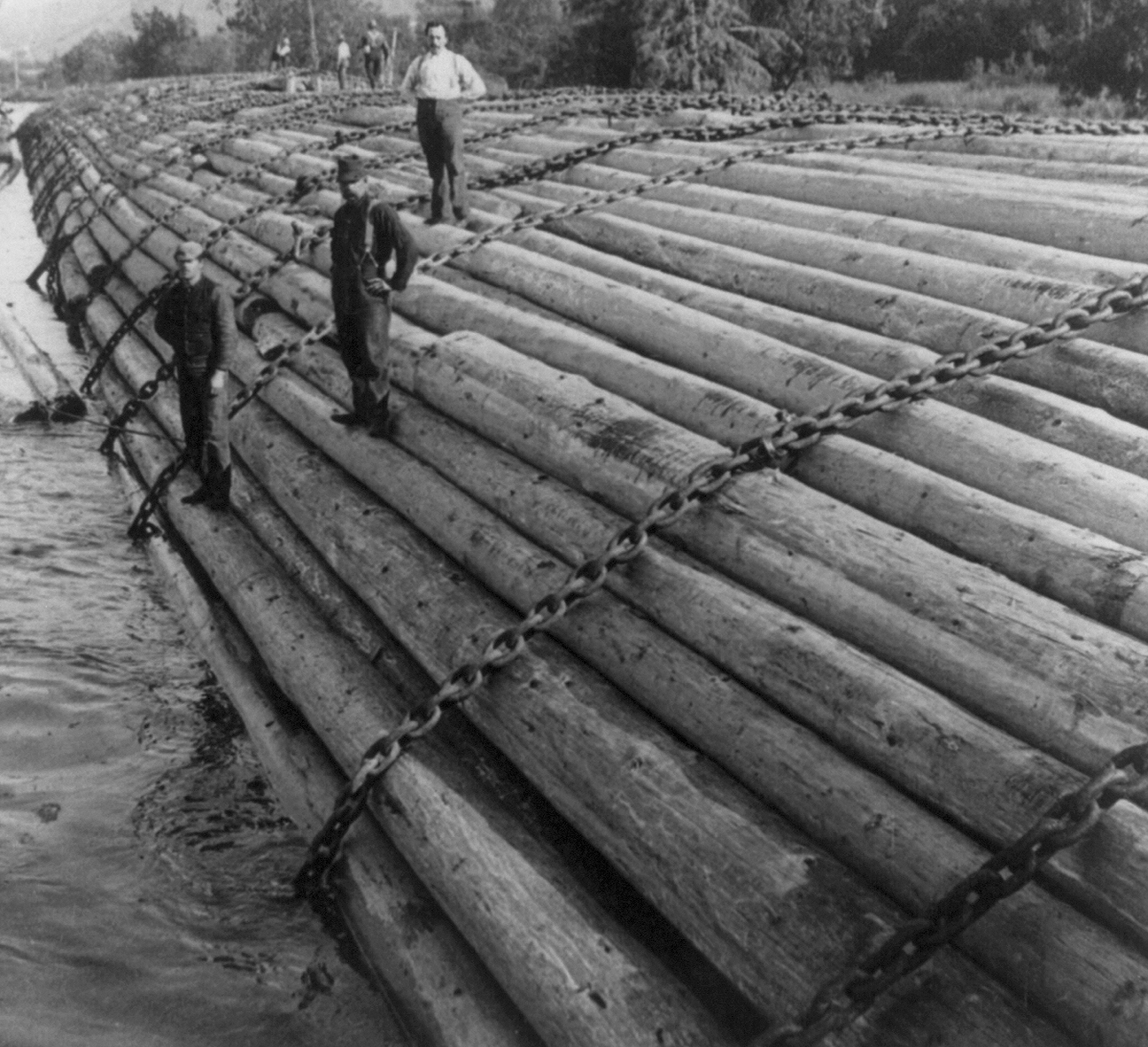
A massive Benson log raft, containing an entire year's worth of logs from one timber camp, heads downriver in 1906

American captain Robert Gray and British captain George Vancouver, who explored the river in 1792, proved that it was possible to cross the Columbia Bar. Many of the challenges associated with that feat remain today; even with modern engineering alterations to the mouth of the river, the strong currents and shifting sandbar make it dangerous to pass between the river and the Pacific Ocean.

The use of steamboats along the river, beginning with the British Beaver in 1836 and followed by American vessels in 1850, contributed to the rapid settlement and economic development of the region. Steamboats operated in several distinct stretches of the river: on its lower reaches, from the Pacific Ocean to Cascades Rapids; from the Cascades to The Dalles-Celilo Falls; from Celilo to the Priest Rapids; on the Wenatchee Reach of eastern Washington; on British Columbia's Arrow Lakes; and on tributaries like the Willamette, the Snake and Kootenay Lake. The boats, initially powered by burning wood, carried passengers and freight throughout the region for many years. Early railroads served to connect steamboat lines interrupted by waterfalls on the river's lower reaches. In the 1880s, railroads maintained by companies such as the Oregon Railroad and Navigation Company began to supplement steamboat operations as the major transportation links along the river.

=== Opening the passage to Lewiston ===
As early as 1881, industrialists proposed altering the natural channel of the Columbia to improve navigation. Changes to the river over the years have included the construction of jetties at the river's mouth, dredging, and the construction of canals and navigation locks. Today, ocean freighters can travel upriver as far as Portland and Vancouver, and barges can reach as far inland as Lewiston, Idaho.

The shifting Columbia Bar makes passage between the river and the Pacific Ocean difficult and dangerous, and numerous rapids along the river hinder navigation. Pacific Graveyard, a 1950 book by James A. Gibbs, describes the many shipwrecks near the mouth of the Columbia. Jetties, first constructed in 1886, extend the river's channel into the ocean. Strong currents and the shifting sandbar remain a threat to ships entering the river and necessitate continuous maintenance of the jetties.

In 1891, the Columbia was dredged to enhance shipping. The channel between the ocean and Portland and Vancouver was deepened from 17 to 25 feet (5.2 to 7.6 m). The Columbian called for the channel to be deepened to 40 feet (12 m) as early as 1905, but that depth was not attained until 1976.

Cascade Locks and Canal were first constructed in 1896 around the Cascades Rapids, enabling boats to travel safely through the Columbia River Gorge. The Celilo Canal, bypassing Celilo Falls, opened to river traffic in 1915. In the mid-20th century, the construction of dams along the length of the river submerged the rapids beneath a series of reservoirs. An extensive system of locks allowed ships and barges to pass easily between reservoirs. A navigation channel reaching Lewiston, Idaho, along the Columbia and Snake rivers, was completed in 1975. Among the main commodities are wheat and other grains, mainly for export. As of 2016, the Columbia ranked third, behind the Mississippi and Paraná rivers, among the world's largest export corridors for grain.

The 1980 eruption of Mount St. Helens caused mudslides in the area, which reduced the Columbia's depth by 25 feet (7.6 m) for a 4-mile (6.4 km) stretch, disrupting Portland's economy.

=== Deeper shipping channel ===
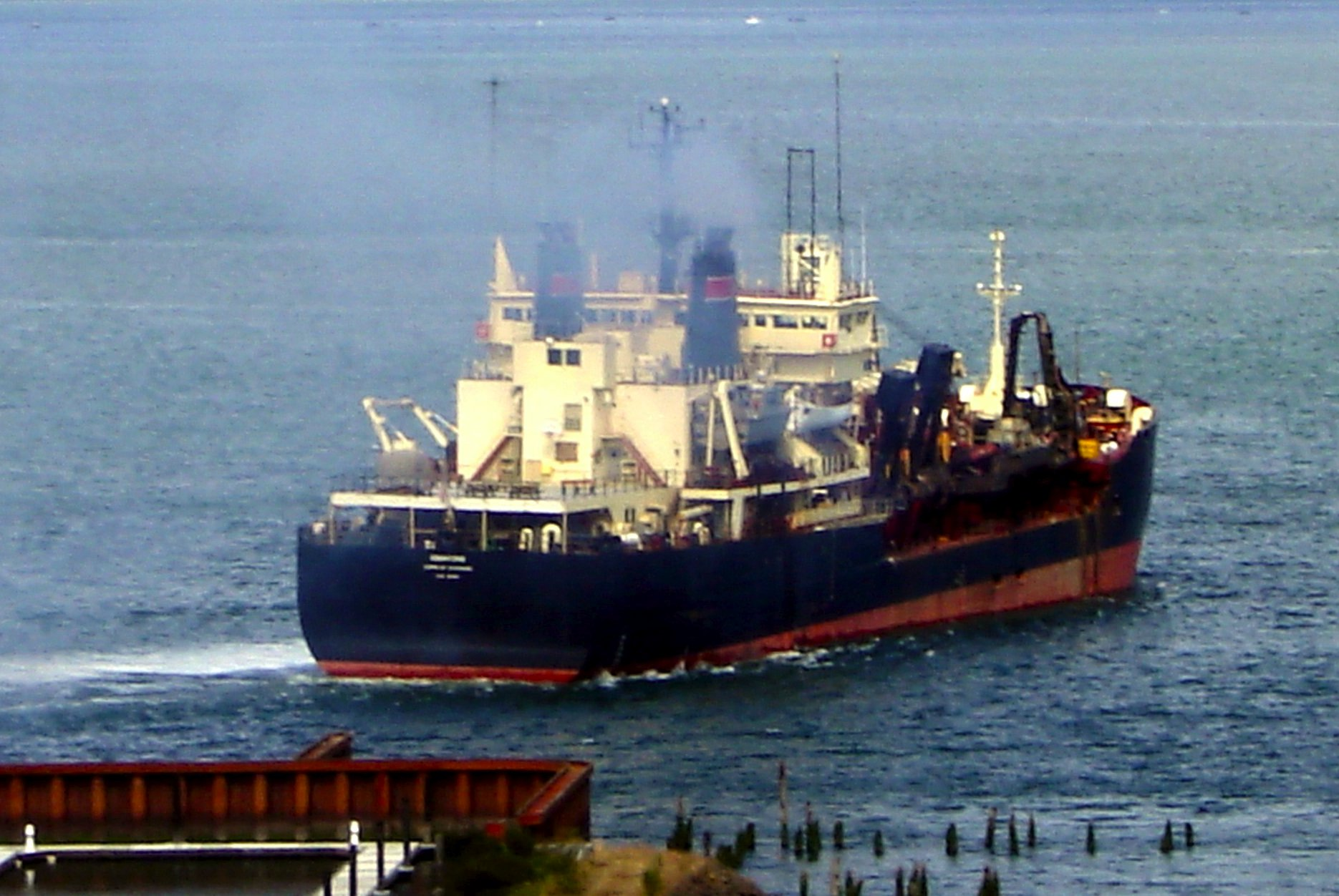
The Essayons, an Army Corps of Engineers dredger tasked with maintenance of shipping channels in the Northwest, began service in 1983.

Efforts to maintain and improve the navigation channel have continued to the present day. In 1990 a new round of studies examined the possibility of further dredging on the lower Columbia. The plans were controversial from the start because of economic and environmental concerns.

In 1999, Congress authorized deepening the channel between Portland and Astoria from 40 to 43 feet (12–13 m), which will make it possible for large container and grain ships to reach Portland and Vancouver. The project has met opposition because of concerns about stirring up toxic sediment on the riverbed. Portland-based Northwest Environmental Advocates brought a lawsuit against the Army Corps of Engineers, but it was rejected by the Ninth U.S. Circuit Court of Appeals in August 2006. The project includes measures to mitigate environmental damage; for instance, the US Army Corps of Engineers must restore 12 times the area of wetland damaged by the project. In early 2006, the Corps spilled 50 US gallons (190 L) of hydraulic oil into the Columbia, drawing further criticism from environmental organizations.

Work on the project began in 2005 and concluded in 2010. The project's cost is estimated at $150 million. The federal government is paying 65 percent, Oregon and Washington are paying $27 million each, and six local ports are also contributing to the cost.

The lower Columbia River, the Snake River as far as Lewiston, and part of the Willamette River make up M-84, a route of the United States Marine Highway Program.

== Dams ==
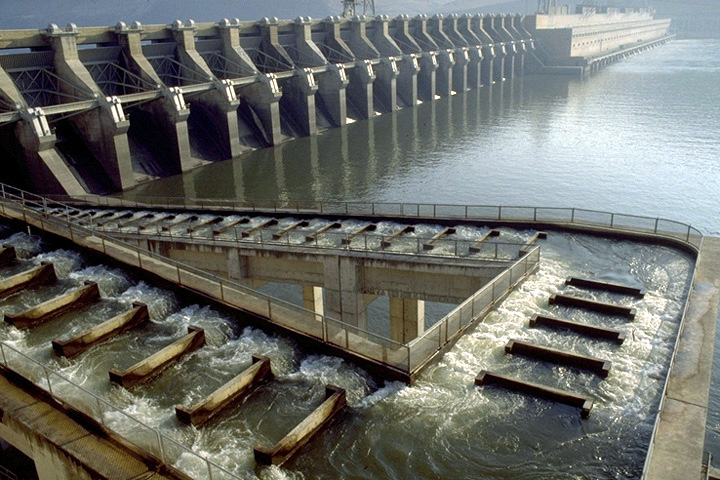
Fish ladder at John Day Dam; its reservoir forms the deadliest stretch of the river for young salmon.

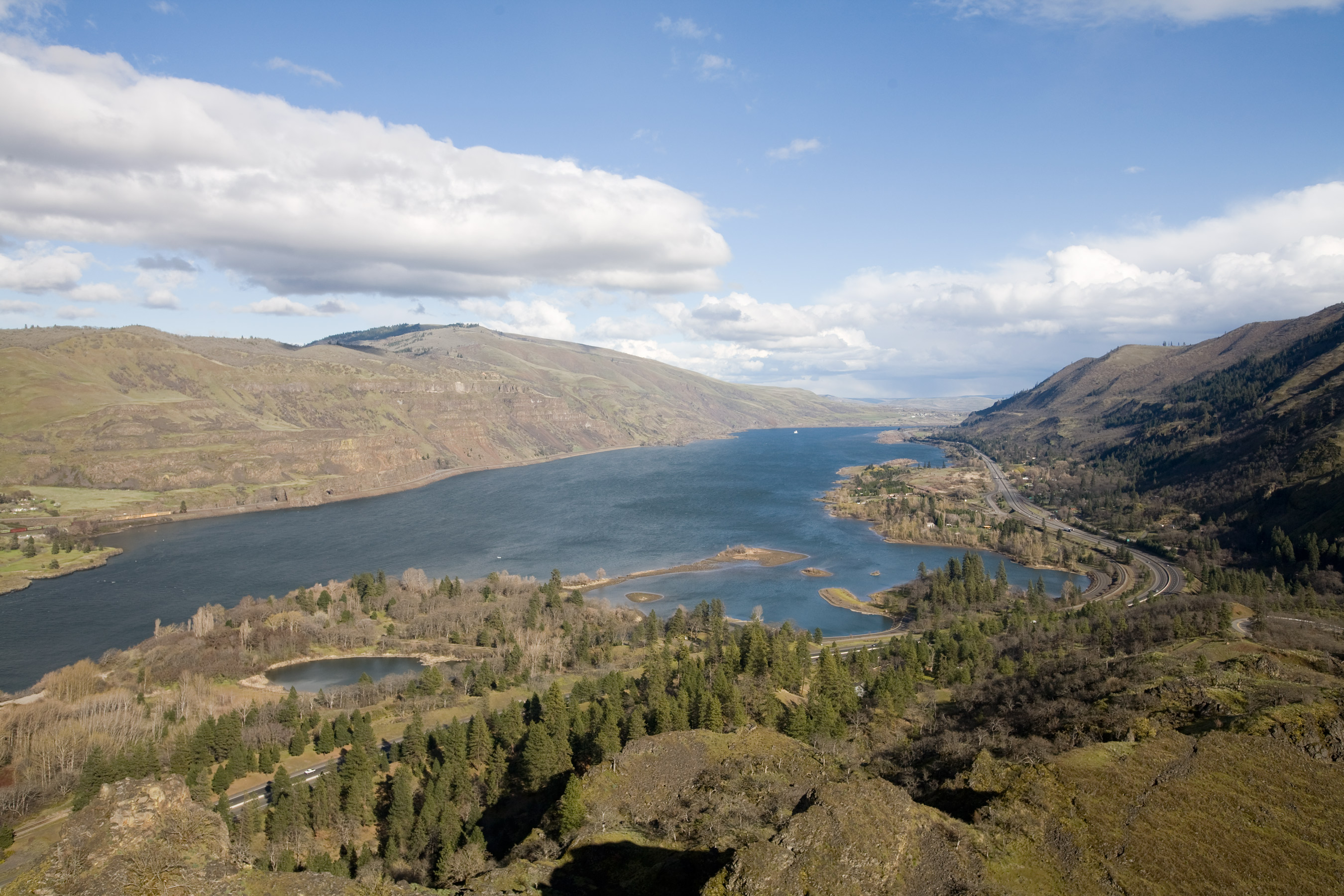
Dams on the Columbia have transformed the river into a series of slackwater pools, such as this one between Bonneville and The Dalles, as seen from Rowena Crest

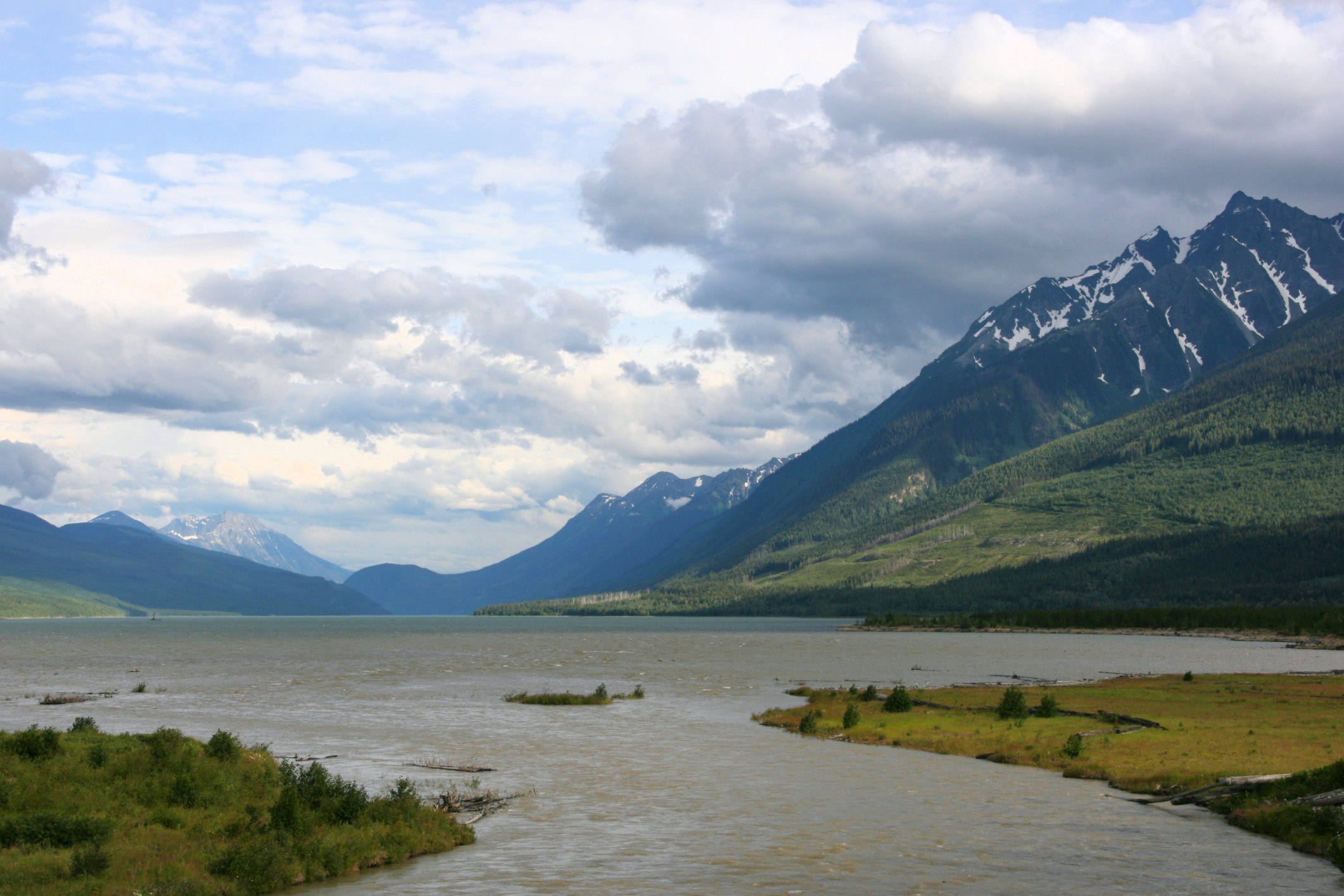
Kinbasket Lake, a reservoir on the Columbia River

In 1902, the United States Bureau of Reclamation was established to aid in the economic development of arid western states. One of its major undertakings was building Grand Coulee Dam to provide irrigation for the 600 thousand acres (2,400 km^{2}) of the Columbia Basin Project in central Washington. With the onset of World War II, the focus of dam construction shifted to production of hydroelectricity. Irrigation efforts resumed after the war.

River development occurred within the structure of the 1909 International Boundary Waters Treaty between the United States and Canada. The United States Congress passed the Rivers and Harbors Act of 1925, which directed the U.S. Army Corps of Engineers and the Federal Power Commission to explore the development of the nation's rivers. This prompted agencies to conduct the first formal financial analysis of hydroelectric development; the reports produced by various agencies were presented in House Document 308. Those reports, and subsequent related reports, are referred to as 308 Reports.

The 308 Reports generated 176 publications across the United States. Of those 176 documents, thirteen of them were generated in the Pacific Northwest. In 1932, one of the thirteen reports was released on the Columbia River, titled The Columbia River and Minor Tributaries. The report was backed by many engineers and state politicians who believed that the creation of dams along the Columbia River would be a strong candidate for generation of hydroelectric power. The report led to congressional action, where dams at Bonneville and Grand Coulee were authorized in 1933.

The report itself emphasized the economic values of dam creation. Additionally, the reports emphasized the importance of dams for river navigation. Furthermore, the reports emphasized the importance of hydropower, storage of water for irrigation techniques, and flood control. To ensure that the dams did not affect biodiversity, many engineers and state politicians regarded the importance of salmon within the region. Thus, dams were to be built at a low height that would permit salmon to pass over.

In the late 1920s, political forces in the Northwestern United States generally favored the private development of hydroelectric dams along the Columbia. But the overwhelming victories of gubernatorial candidate George W. Joseph in the 1930 Republican primary, and later his law partner Julius Meier, were understood to demonstrate strong public support for public ownership of dams. In 1933, President Franklin D. Roosevelt signed a bill that enabled the construction of the Bonneville and Grand Coulee dams as public works projects. The legislation was attributed to the efforts of Oregon Senator Charles McNary, Washington Senator Clarence Dill, and Oregon Congressman Charles Martin, among others.

In 1948, floods swept through the Columbia watershed, destroying Vanport, then the second largest city in Oregon, and impacting cities as far north as Trail, BC. The flooding prompted the U.S. Congress to pass the Flood Control Act of 1950, authorizing the federal development of additional dams and other flood control mechanisms. By that time local communities had become wary of federal hydroelectric projects, and sought local control of new developments; a public utility district in Grant County, Washington, ultimately began construction of the Priest Rapids Dam.

In the 1960s, the United States and Canada signed the Columbia River Treaty, which focused on flood control and the maximization of downstream power generation. Canada agreed to build dams and provide reservoir storage, and the United States agreed to deliver to Canada one-half of the increase in United States downstream power benefits as estimated five years in advance. Canada's obligation was met by building three dams (two on the Columbia, and one on the Duncan River), the last of which was completed in 1973.

Today the main stem of the Columbia River has fourteen dams, of which three are in Canada and eleven in the United States. Four mainstem dams and four lower Snake River dams contain navigation locks to allow ship and barge passage from the ocean as far as Lewiston, Idaho. The river system as a whole has more than 400 dams for hydroelectricity and irrigation. The dams address a variety of demands, including flood control, navigation, stream flow regulation, storage, and delivery of stored waters, reclamation of public lands and Indian reservations and territories, and the generation of hydroelectric power.

This river may have been shaped by God, or glaciers, or the remnants of the inland sea, or gravity, or a combination of all, but the Army Corps of Engineers controls it now. The Columbia rises and falls, not by the dictates of tide or rainfall, but by a computer-activated, legally arbitrated, federally allocated schedule that changes only when significant litigation is concluded, or a United States Senator nears election time. In that sense, it is reliable.

— Timothy Egan, in The Good Rain

The larger U.S. dams are owned and operated by the federal government (some by the Army Corps of Engineers and some by the Bureau of Reclamation), while the smaller dams are operated by public utility districts and private power companies. The federally operated system is known as the Federal Columbia River Power System, which includes 31 dams on the Columbia and its tributaries. The system has altered the seasonal flow of the river to meet higher electricity demands during the winter. At the beginning of the 20th century, roughly 75 percent of the Columbia's flow occurred in the summer, between April and September. By 1980, the summer proportion had been lowered to about 50 percent, essentially eliminating the seasonal pattern.

Upon its creation in 1942, the Grand Coulee Dam required land inundation for construction. This flooding included parts of the Colville Reservation and Spokane Reservation. Reservation flooding has resulted in the displacement of 2,250 indigenous peoples located on those reservations.

The installation of dams dramatically altered the landscape and ecosystem of the river. At one time, the Columbia was one of the top salmon-producing river systems in the world. Previously active fishing sites, such as Celilo Falls in the eastern Columbia River Gorge, have exhibited a sharp decline in fishing along the Columbia in the last century, and salmon populations have been dramatically reduced. Fish ladders have been installed at some dam sites to help the fish journey to spawning waters. Fish ladders have been seen as highly effective when configurations to fishway exits are properly configured, as reconstructing the Bradford Island fish ladder allowed Sockeye salmon to stray away from spillway zones, reducing fallback (the rate at which fish are found moving away from a dam post-migration) and mortality birthrates. However, improper construction of fish ladders can result in salmon populations exerting significantly more energy when breeding, which results in higher levels of fallback. Chief Joseph Dam has no fish ladders and completely blocks fish migration to the upper half of the Columbia River system.

In 2019, both the Yakama and Lummi Northwest Nations proposed to remove the Bonneville, John Day, and The Dalles dams due to their belief removal would strengthen salmon population. Jay Julius, Chairman of the Lummi Nation, stated in 2019 that the fate of salmon without dam removal for the Lummi is a "horrifying reality". JoDe Goudy, Chairman of the Yakama Nation, stated that "the Columbia River Dams were built on [a] false legal foundation, and decimated the Yakama Nation’s fisheries, traditional foods, and cultural sites." Both Nations have worked with nonprofit advocacy organizations to further removal agendas.

Throughout 2021, the nonprofit organization Earthjustice represented 10 conservation and fishing organizations in negotiations with President Joe Biden over removal of dam operations on the Snake River. These negotiations culminated in a lawsuit, with Earthjustice requesting to completely halt operations due to their belief of Snake River dam effects on salmon and steelhead fish runs. On December 15, 2021, the two parties agreed to settle the dispute and focus on a plan to mitigate fish extinction.

Joe Biden agreed to a $1 billion mandate, proposed in December 2023, which will attempt to reintroduce Columbia River salmon blockaded by dams. The mandate asked for the Bonneville Power Administration to supply US$300 million over a ten-year span starting in 2024, which includes habitat restoration and upgrades in fish hatcheries. Furthermore, the Biden administration stated it would examine the possibility of doubling fish and wildlife spending to meet tribal needs. As a benchmark for financial utilization, US$1 billion in backlogged projects have been identified in the Columbia River Basin. The mandate did not call for the removal of four dams on the Snake River.

=== Irrigation ===
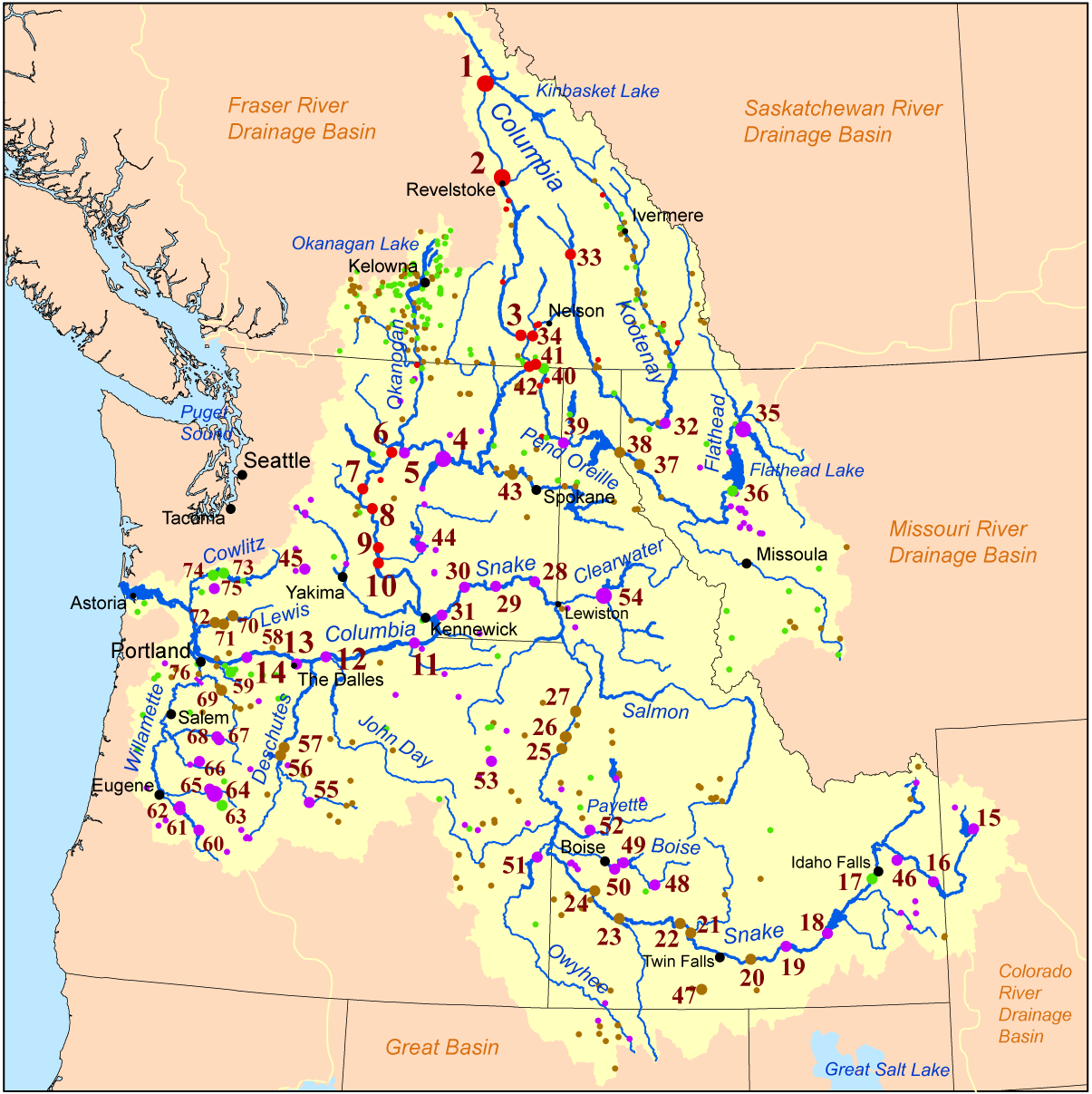
Prominent dams of the Columbia River Basin. Color indicates dam ownership: US Federal government Public utilities State, provincial, or local government Private

The Bureau of Reclamation's Columbia Basin Project focused on the generally dry region of central Washington known as the Columbia Basin, which features rich loess soil. Several groups developed competing proposals, and in 1933, President Franklin D. Roosevelt authorized the Columbia Basin Project. The Grand Coulee Dam was the project's central component; upon completion, it pumped water up from the Columbia to fill the formerly dry Grand Coulee, forming Banks Lake. By 1935, the intended height of the dam was increased from a range between 200 and 300 feet (61 and 91 m) to 500 feet (150 m), a height that would extend the lake impounded by the dam to the Canada–United States border; the project had grown from a local New Deal relief measure to a major national project.

The project's initial purpose was irrigation, but the onset of World War II created a high electricity demand, mainly for aluminum production and for the development of nuclear weapons at the Hanford Site. Irrigation began in 1951. The project provides water to more than 670 thousand acres (2,700 square kilometers) of fertile but arid land in central Washington, transforming the region into a major agricultural center. Important crops include orchard fruit, potatoes, alfalfa, mint, beans, beets, and wine grapes.

Since 1750, the Columbia has experienced six multi-year droughts. The longest, lasting 12 years in the mid‑19th century, reduced the river's flow to 20 percent below average. Scientists have expressed concern that a similar drought would have grave consequences in a region so dependent on the Columbia. In 1992–1993, a lesser drought affected farmers, hydroelectric power producers, shippers, and wildlife managers.

Many farmers in central Washington build dams on their property for irrigation and to control frost on their crops. The Washington Department of Ecology, using new techniques involving aerial photographs, estimated there may be as many as a hundred such dams in the area, most of which are illegal. Six such dams have failed in recent years, causing hundreds of thousands of dollars of damage to crops and public roads. Fourteen farms in the area have gone through the permitting process to build such dams legally.

=== Hydroelectricity ===
The Columbia's heavy flow and large elevation drop over a short distance, 2.16 feet per mile (40.9 centimeters per kilometer), give it tremendous capacity for hydroelectricity generation. In comparison, the Mississippi drops less than 0.65 feet per mile (12.3 cm/km). The Columbia alone possesses one-third of the United States's hydroelectric potential. In 2012, the river and its tributaries accounted for 29 GW of hydroelectric generating capacity, contributing 44 percent of the total hydroelectric generation in the nation.

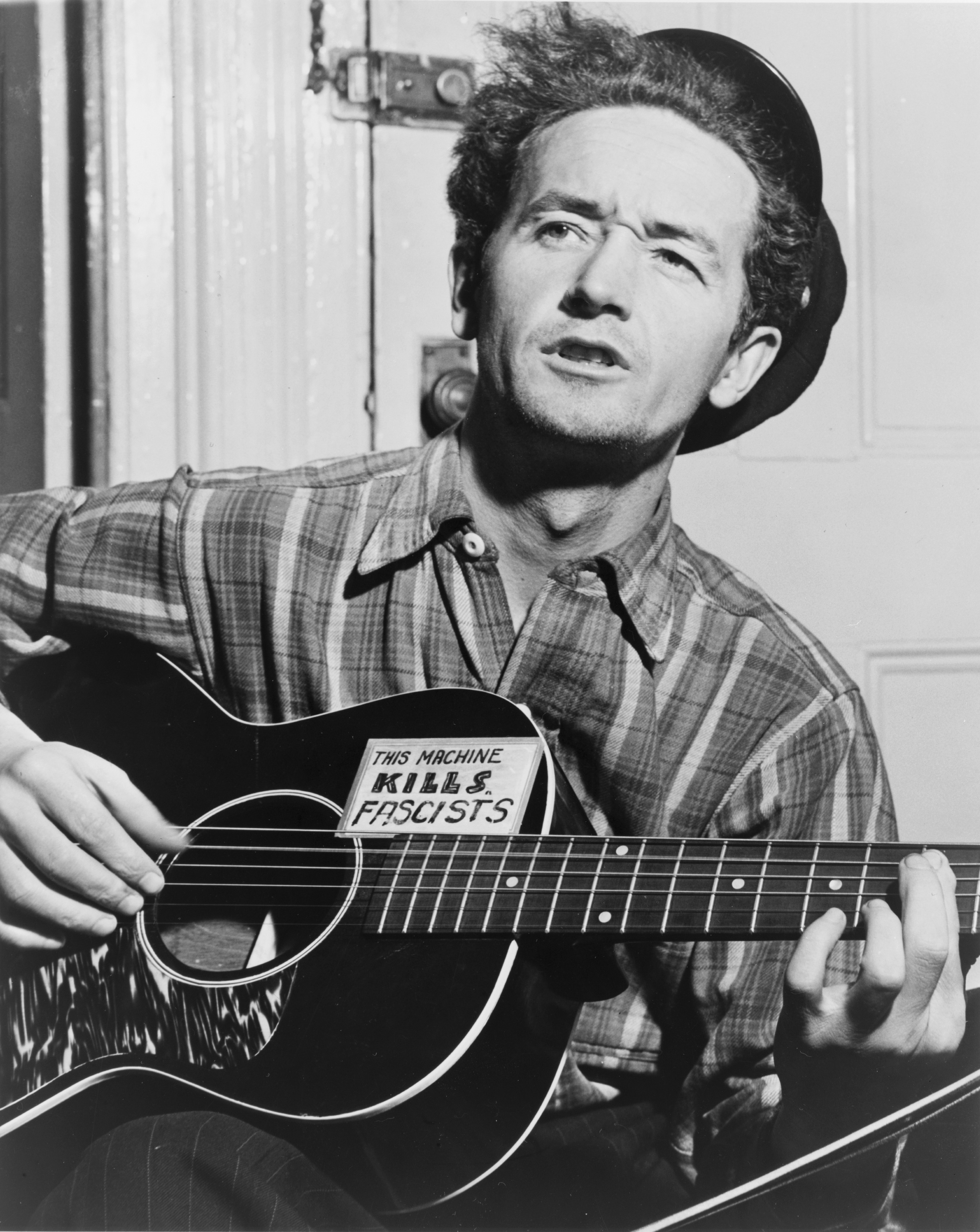
Roll on, Columbia, roll on, roll on, Columbia, roll on / Your power is turning our darkness to dawn / Roll on, Columbia, roll on. Lyrics from Woody Guthrie's 1941 song Roll on Columbia, written for the Bonneville Power Administration.

The largest of the 150 hydroelectric projects, the Grand Coulee Dam and Chief Joseph Dam are also the largest in the United States. As of 2017, Grand Coulee is the fifth largest hydroelectric plant in the world.

Inexpensive hydropower supported the location of a large aluminum industry in the region because its reduction from bauxite requires large amounts of electricity. Until 2000, the Northwestern United States produced up to 17 percent of the world's aluminum and 40 percent of the aluminum produced in the United States. The commoditization of power in the early 21st century, coupled with a drought that reduced the generation capacity of the river, damaged the industry and by 2001, Columbia River aluminum producers had idled 80 percent of its production capacity. By 2003, the entire United States produced only 15 percent of the world's aluminum and many smelters along the Columbia had gone dormant or out of business.

Power remains relatively inexpensive along the Columbia, and since the mid-2000 several global enterprises have moved server farm operations into the area to avail themselves of cheap power. Downriver of Grand Coulee, each dam's reservoir is closely regulated by the Bonneville Power Administration (BPA), the U.S. Army Corps of Engineers, and various Washington public utility districts to ensure flow, flood control, and power generation objectives are met. Increasingly, hydro-power operations are required to meet standards under the U.S. Endangered Species Act and other agreements to manage operations to minimize impacts on salmon and other fish, and some conservation and fishing groups support removing four dams on the lower Snake River, the largest tributary of the Columbia.

In 1941, the BPA hired Oklahoma folksinger Woody Guthrie to write songs for a documentary film promoting the benefits of hydropower. In the month he spent traveling the region Guthrie wrote 26 songs, which have become an important part of the cultural history of the region.

== Ecology and environment ==
=== Fish migration ===
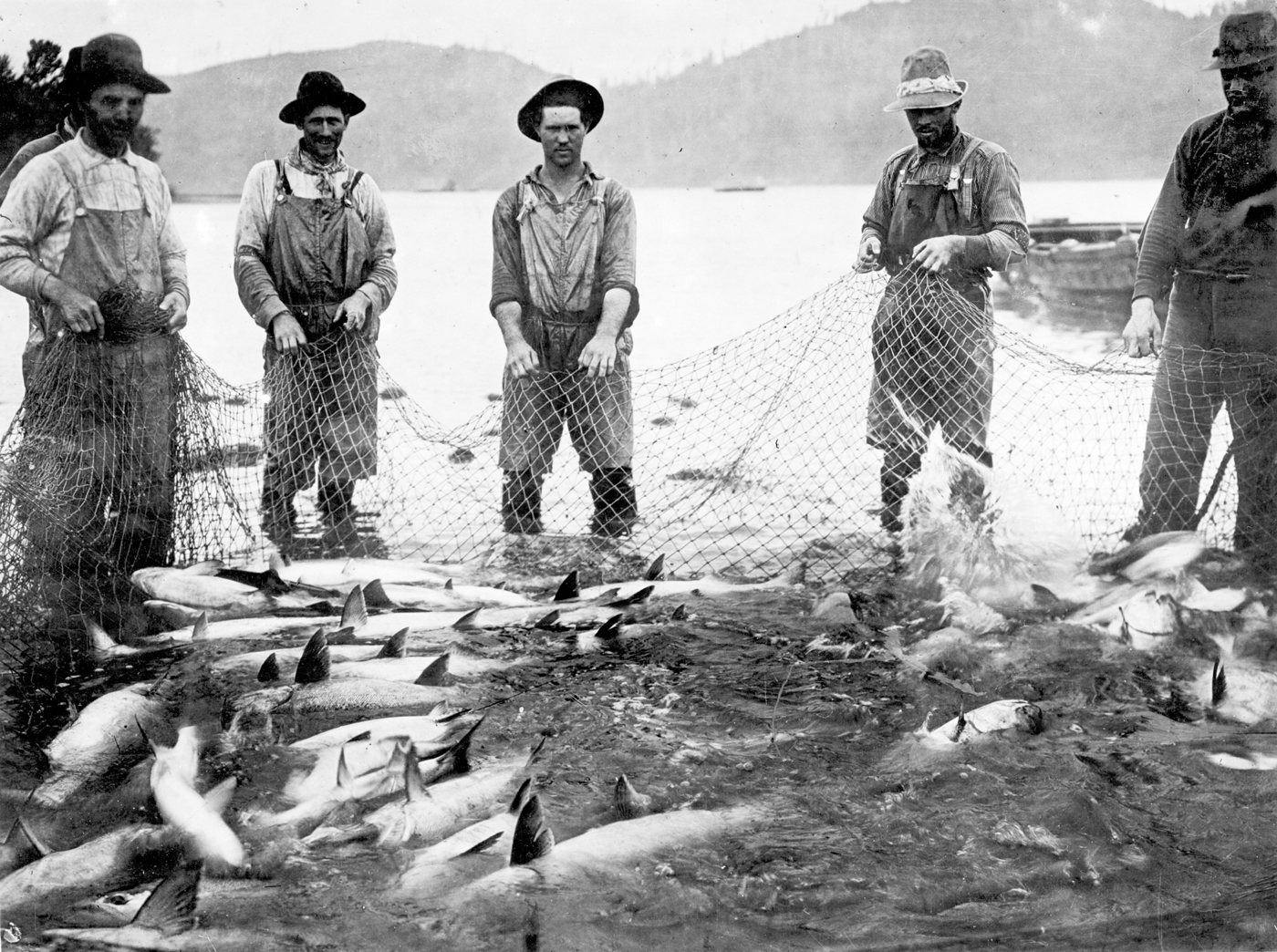
Seining salmon on the Columbia River, 1914

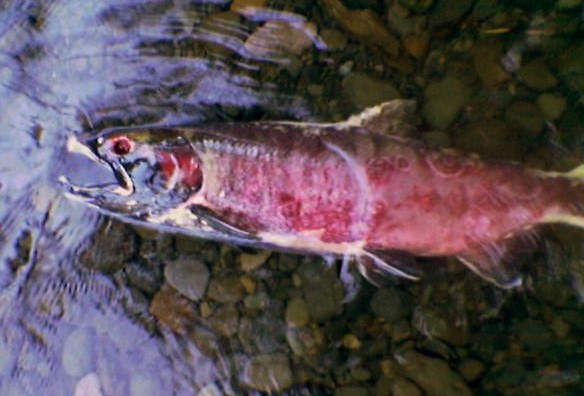
In their natural life cycle, salmon die shortly after spawning. Eagle Creek in Oregon, November 2007.

The Columbia supports several species of anadromous fish that migrate between the Pacific Ocean and freshwater tributaries of the river. Sockeye, Coho and Chinook ("king") salmon, and steelhead, all of the genus Oncorhynchus, are ocean fish that migrate up the rivers at the end of their life cycles to spawn. White sturgeon, which take 15 to 25 years to mature, typically migrate between the ocean and the upstream habitat several times during their lives.

Salmon populations declined dramatically after the establishment of canneries in 1867. In 1879 it was reported that 545,450 salmon, with an average weight of 22 pounds (10.0 kg) were caught (in a recent season) and mainly canned for export to England. A can weighing 1 pound (0.45 kg) could be sold for 8 or 9 pence. By 1908, there was widespread concern about the decline of salmon and sturgeon. In that year, the people of Oregon passed two laws under their newly instituted program of citizens' initiatives limiting fishing on the Columbia and other rivers. Then in 1948, another initiative banned the use of seine nets (devices already used by Native Americans, and refined by later settlers) altogether.

Dams interrupt the migration of anadromous fish. Salmon and steelhead return to the streams in which they were born to spawn; where dams prevent their return, entire populations of salmon die. Some of the Columbia and Snake River dams employ fish ladders, which are effective to varying degrees at allowing these fish to travel upstream. Another problem exists for the juvenile salmon headed downstream to the ocean. Previously, this journey would have taken two to three weeks. With river currents slowed by the dams, and the Columbia converted from a wild river to a series of slackwater pools, the journey can take several months, which increases the mortality rate. In some cases, the Army Corps of Engineers transports juvenile fish downstream by truck or river barge. The Chief Joseph Dam and several dams on the Columbia's tributaries entirely block migration, and there are no migrating fish on the river above these dams. Sturgeons have different migration habits and can survive without ever visiting the ocean. In many upstream areas cut off from the ocean by dams, sturgeon simply live upstream of the dam.

Not all fish have suffered from the modifications to the river; the northern pikeminnow (formerly known as the squawfish) thrives in the warmer, slower water created by the dams. Research in the mid-1980s found that juvenile salmon were suffering substantially from the predatory pikeminnow, and in 1990, in the interest of protecting salmon, a "bounty" program was established to reward anglers for catching pikeminnow.

In 1994, the salmon catch was smaller than usual in the rivers of Oregon, Washington, and British Columbia, causing concern among commercial fishermen, government agencies, and tribal leaders. US government intervention, to which the states of Alaska, Idaho, and Oregon objected, included an 11-day closure of an Alaska fishery. In April 1994 the Pacific Fisheries Management Council unanimously approved the strictest regulations in 18 years, banning all commercial salmon fishing for that year from Cape Falcon north to the Canada–US border. In the winter of 1994, the return of coho salmon far exceeded expectations, which was attributed in part to the fishing ban.

Also in 1994, United States Secretary of the Interior Bruce Babbitt proposed the removal of several Pacific Northwest dams because of their impact on salmon spawning. The Northwest Power Planning Council approved a plan that provided more water for fish and less for electricity, irrigation, and transportation. Environmental advocates have called for the removal of certain dams in the Columbia system in the years since. Of the 227 major dams in the Columbia River drainage basin, the four Washington dams on the lower Snake River are often identified for removal, for example in an ongoing lawsuit concerning a Bush administration plan for salmon recovery. These dams and reservoirs limit the recovery of upriver salmon runs to Idaho's Salmon and Clearwater rivers. Historically, the Snake produced over 1.5 million spring and summer Chinook salmon, a number that has dwindled to several thousand in recent years. Idaho Power Company's Hells Canyon dams have no fish ladders (and do not pass juvenile salmon downstream), and thus allow no steelhead or salmon to migrate above Hells Canyon. In 2007, the destruction of the Marmot Dam on the Sandy River was the first dam removal in the system. Other Columbia Basin dams that have been removed include Condit Dam on Washington's White Salmon River, and the Milltown Dam on the Clark Fork in Montana.

=== Pollution ===
In southeastern Washington, a 50-mile (80 km) stretch of the river passes through the Hanford Site, established in 1943 as part of the Manhattan Project. The site served as a plutonium production complex, with nine nuclear reactors and related facilities along the banks of the river. From 1944 to 1971, pump systems drew cooling water from the river and, after treating this water for use by the reactors, returned it to the river. Before being released back into the river, the used water was held in retention basins for up to six hours. Longer-lived isotopes were not affected by this retention, and several terabecquerels entered the river every day. By 1957, the eight plutonium production reactors at Hanford dumped a daily average of 50,000 curies of radioactive material into the Columbia. These releases were kept secret by the federal government until the release of declassified documents in the late 1980s. Radiation was measured downstream as far west as the Washington and Oregon coasts.

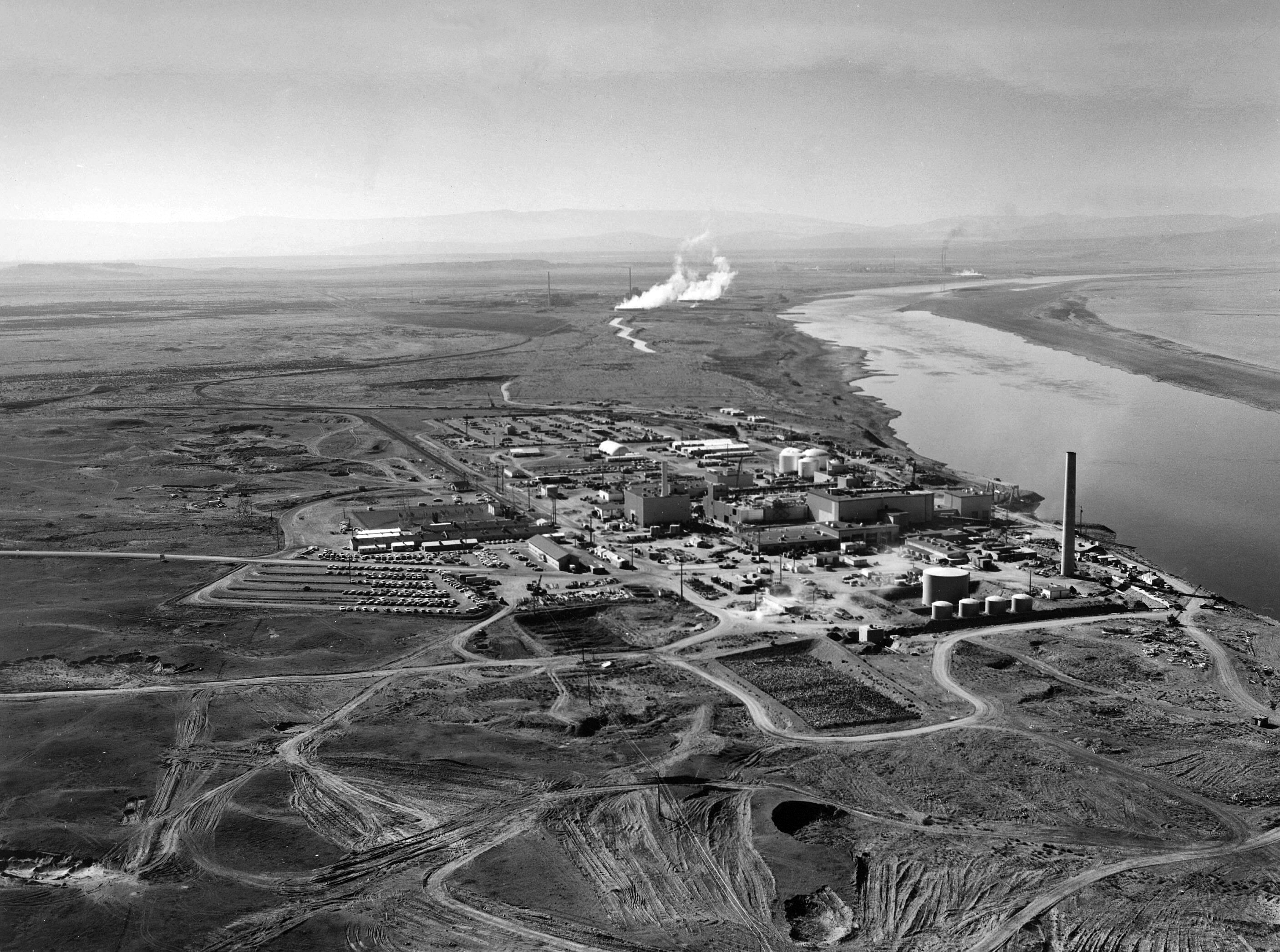
Nuclear reactors at the Hanford Site along the river

The nuclear reactors were decommissioned at the end of the Cold War, and the Hanford site is the focus of one of the world's largest environmental cleanup, managed by the Department of Energy under the oversight of the Washington Department of Ecology and the Environmental Protection Agency. Nearby aquifers contain an estimated 270 billion US gallons (1 billion m^{3}) of groundwater contaminated by high-level nuclear waste that has leaked out of Hanford's underground storage tanks. As of 2008, 1 million US gallons (3,785 m^{3}) of highly radioactive waste is traveling through groundwater toward the Columbia River. This waste was expected to reach the river within 12 to 50 years if cleanup did not proceed on schedule.

In addition to concerns about nuclear waste, numerous other pollutants are found in the river. These include chemical pesticides, bacteria, arsenic, dioxins, and polychlorinated biphenyls (PCB).

Studies have also found significant levels of toxins in fish and the waters they inhabit within the basin. Accumulation of toxins in fish threatens the survival of fish species, and human consumption of these fish can lead to health problems. Water quality is also an important factor in the survival of other wildlife and plants that grow in the Columbia River drainage basin. The states, indigenous tribes, and federal government are all engaged in efforts to restore and improve the water, land, and air quality of the Columbia River drainage basin and have committed to work together to accomplish critical ecosystem restoration efforts. Several cleanup efforts are underway, including Superfund projects at Portland Harbor, Hanford, and Lake Roosevelt.

In early 2022, thousands of protestors demonstrated a demand for heightened cleanup efforts within the Hanford Nuclear Site. In June 2022, nearly 200 protestors attended the Hanford Journey Event, an educational tour which allowed those concerned about the Hanford Nuclear Site to learn about proposed cleanup efforts.The Hanford Journey Event was co-sponsored by the Yakama Nation. Davis Washines, a representative from the Yakama Nation Department of Natural Resources, alluded to "[the Hanford cleanup] has a lot of meaning to us, to our people. And not just for us, our personal safety, but to this ground, to the water, because they were here before we were". Congress responded in 2022 by increasing the budget for the Hanford clean-up efforts, after thousands of comments were sent to federal authorities to prevent high-level waste storage at Hanford.

The Hanford Nuclear Site's vitrification plant accepted its first batch of low-activity waste from the tank farms on October 8, 2025, ahead of the October 15, 2025 deadline, to start operations at the plant. In the facility, concentrated low-activity waste is mixed with silica and other glass-forming materials. The melters being utilized have a lifespan of five years, which will require their replacement in 2030. As of 2023, the Hanford site cleanup project was sixteen years behind schedule. One of the harmful chemicals located in the Hanford site, strontium-90, reached over 2,000 times the standard concentration for drinking water in August 2022.

Timber industry activity further contaminates river water, for example in the increased sediment runoff that results from clearcuts. The Northwest Forest Plan, a piece of federal legislation from 1994, mandated that timber companies consider the environmental impacts of their practices on rivers like the Columbia.

On July 1, 2003, Christopher Swain became the first person to swim the Columbia River's entire length, to raise public awareness about the river's environmental health.

Throughout 2019, a series of wildfires were ongoing in Oregon on indigenous land belonging to the Umpqua Tribe. The Umpqua lost possession of their former territory, which is now known as the Elliott State Forest, in 1853. Elliott State Forest has been the subject of many deforestation initiatives over past years. In December 2018, the Umpqua tribe settled in Oregon after purchasing land from the Bureau of Land Management. Michael Rondeau, a descendent of the Umpqua tribe, expressed his contradictory emotions on the acquisition, stating that he felt "sadness that [his] grandparents and great aunts and uncles and beyond that did not have a day of recognition". On July 14, 2019, in the Milepost 97 wildfires, 25% of the Umpqua's forest territory burned down.

On March 7, 2022, Columbia Riverkeeper, a climate advocacy group, sued Weyerhaeuser, a timber and forest products company, for possible contamination of the Columbia River. Columbia Riverkeeper accused Weyerhaeuser of releasing harmful levels of runoff through their Longview Mill into the Columbia River. Furthermore, Columbia Riverkeeper stated that runoff could result in harmful bacteria growth. As of May 6, 2022, Weyerhaeuser reached a settlement with Columbia Riverkeeper. Weyerhaeuser was determined to contribute US$600,000 for river restoration and proposed potential fines of up to US$5,000 for each subsequent act of pollution between 2023 and 2025.

=== Nutrient cycle ===
Both natural and anthropogenic processes are involved in the cycling of nutrients in the Columbia River basin. Natural processes in the system include estuarine mixing of fresh and ocean waters, and climate variability patterns such as the Pacific Decadal Oscillation and the El Nino Southern Oscillation (both climatic cycles that affect the amount of regional snowpack and river discharge). Natural sources of nutrients in the Columbia River include weathering, leaf litter, salmon carcasses, runoff from its tributaries, and ocean estuary exchange. Major anthropogenic impacts on nutrients in the basin are due to fertilizers from agriculture, sewage systems, logging, and the construction of dams.

Nutrient dynamics vary in the river basin from the headwaters to the main river and dams, to finally reaching the Columbia River estuary and ocean. Upstream in the headwaters, salmon runs are the main source of nutrients. Dams along the river impact nutrient cycling by increasing residence time of nutrients, and reducing the transport of silicate to the estuary, which directly impacts diatoms, a type of phytoplankton. The dams are also a barrier to salmon migration and can increase the amount of methane locally produced. The Columbia River estuary exports high rates of nutrients into the Pacific, except for nitrogen, which is delivered into the estuary by ocean upwelling sources.

== Watershed ==
Near The Gorge Amphitheatre in George, Washington

Most of the Columbia's drainage basin (which, at 258,000 square miles or 670,000 square kilometres, is about the size of France) lies roughly between the Rocky Mountains on the east and the Cascade Mountains on the west. In the United States and Canada the term watershed is often used to mean drainage basin. The term Columbia Basin is used to refer not only to the entire drainage basin but also to subsets of the river's watershed, such as the relatively flat and unforested area in eastern Washington bounded by the Cascades, the Rocky Mountains, and the Blue Mountains. Within the watershed are diverse landforms including mountains, arid plateaus, river valleys, rolling uplands, and deep gorges. Grand Teton National Park lies in the watershed, as well as parts of Yellowstone National Park, Glacier National Park, Mount Rainier National Park, and North Cascades National Park. Canadian National Parks in the watershed include Kootenay National Park, Yoho National Park, Glacier National Park, and Mount Revelstoke National Park. Hells Canyon, the deepest gorge in North America, and the Columbia Gorge are in the watershed. Vegetation varies widely, ranging from western hemlock and western redcedar in the moist regions to sagebrush in the arid regions. The watershed provides habitat for 609 known fish and wildlife species, including the bull trout, bald eagle, gray wolf, grizzly bear, and Canada lynx.

The World Wide Fund for Nature (WWF) divides the waters of the Columbia and its tributaries into three freshwater ecoregions: Columbia Glaciated, Columbia Unglaciated, and Upper Snake. The Columbia Glaciated ecoregion, about a third of the total watershed, lies in the north and was covered with ice sheets during the Pleistocene. The ecoregion includes the mainstem Columbia north of the Snake River and tributaries such as the Yakima, Okanagan, Pend Oreille, Clark Fork, and Kootenay rivers. The effects of glaciation include a number of large lakes and a relatively low diversity of freshwater fish. The Upper Snake ecoregion is defined as the Snake River watershed above Shoshone Falls, which totally blocks fish migration. This region has 14 species of fish, many of which are endemic. The Columbia Unglaciated ecoregion makes up the rest of the watershed. It includes the mainstem Columbia below the Snake River and tributaries such as the Salmon, John Day, Deschutes, and lower Snake rivers. Of the three ecoregions it is the richest in terms of freshwater species diversity. There are 35 species of fish, of which four are endemic. There are also high levels of mollusk endemism.

In 2016, over eight million people lived within the Columbia's drainage basin. Of this total about 3.5 million people lived in Oregon, 2.1 million in Washington, 1.7 million in Idaho, half a million in British Columbia, and 0.4 million in Montana. Population in the watershed has been rising for many decades and is projected to rise to about 10 million by 2030. The highest population densities are found west of the Cascade Mountains along the I-5 corridor, especially in the Portland-Vancouver urban area. High densities are also found around Spokane, Washington, and Boise, Idaho. Although much of the watershed is rural and sparsely populated, areas with recreational and scenic values are growing rapidly. The central Oregon county of Deschutes is the fastest-growing in the state. Populations have also been growing just east of the Cascades in central Washington around the city of Yakima and the Tri-Cities area. Projections for the coming decades assume growth throughout the watershed. The Canadian part of the Okanagan subbasin is also growing rapidly.

Climate varies greatly within the watershed. Elevation ranges from sea level at the river mouth to more than 14,000 feet (4,300 m) in the mountains, and temperatures vary with elevation. The highest peak is Mount Rainier, at 14,411 feet (4,392 m). High elevations have cold winters and short cool summers; interior regions are subject to great temperature variability and severe droughts. Over some of the watershed, especially west of the Cascade Mountains, precipitation maximums occur in winter, when Pacific storms come ashore. Atmospheric conditions block the flow of moisture in summer, which is generally dry except for occasional thunderstorms in the interior. In some of the eastern parts of the watershed, especially shrub-steppe regions with Continental climate patterns, precipitation maximums occur in early summer. Annual precipitation varies from more than 100 inches (250 cm) a year in the Cascades to less than 8 inches (20 cm) in the interior. Much of the watershed gets less than 12 inches (30 cm) a year.

Several major North American drainage basins and many minor ones border the Columbia River's drainage basin. To the east, in northern Wyoming and Montana, the Continental Divide separates the Columbia watershed from the Mississippi-Missouri watershed, which empties into the Gulf of Mexico. To the northeast, mostly along the southern border between British Columbia and Alberta, the Continental Divide separates the Columbia watershed from the Nelson-Lake Winnipeg-Saskatchewan watershed, which empties into Hudson Bay. The Mississippi and Nelson watersheds are separated by the Laurentian Divide, which meets the Continental Divide at Triple Divide Peak near the headwaters of the Columbia's Flathead River tributary. This point marks the meeting of three of North America's main drainage patterns, to the Pacific Ocean, to Hudson Bay, and to the Atlantic Ocean via the Gulf of Mexico.

Further north along the Continental Divide, a short portion of the combined Continental and Laurentian divides separate the Columbia watershed from the Mackenzie-Slave-Athabasca watershed, which empties into the Arctic Ocean. The Nelson and Mackenzie watersheds are separated by a divide between streams flowing to the Arctic Ocean and those of the Hudson Bay watershed. This divide meets the Continental Divide at Snow Dome (also known as Dome), near the northernmost bend of the Columbia River.

To the southeast, in western Wyoming, another divide separates the Columbia watershed from the Colorado–Green watershed, which empties into the Gulf of California. The Columbia, Colorado, and Mississippi watersheds meet at Three Waters Mountain in the Wind River Range of Wyoming. To the south, in Oregon, Nevada, Utah, Idaho, and Wyoming, the Columbia watershed is divided from the Great Basin, whose several watersheds are endorheic, not emptying into any ocean but rather drying up or sinking into sumps. Great Basin watersheds that share a border with the Columbia watershed include Harney Basin, Humboldt River, and Great Salt Lake. The associated triple divide points are Commissary Ridge North, Wyoming, and Sproats Meadow Northwest, Oregon. To the north, mostly in British Columbia, the Columbia watershed borders the Fraser River watershed. To the west and southwest the Columbia watershed borders a number of smaller watersheds that drain to the Pacific Ocean, such as the Klamath River in Oregon and California and the Puget Sound Basin in Washington.

=== Major tributaries ===
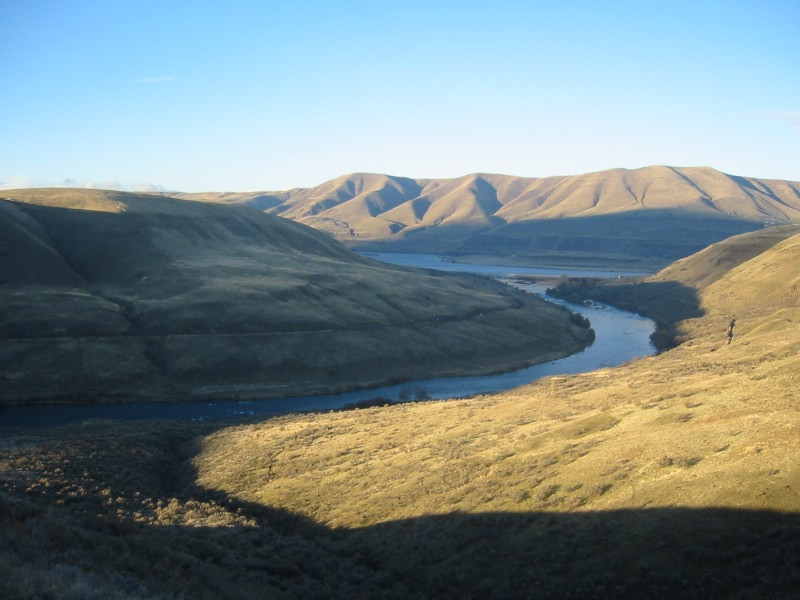
The Deschutes River at its confluence with the Columbia

The Columbia receives more than 60 significant tributaries. The four largest that empty directly into the Columbia (measured either by discharge or by size of watershed) are the Snake River (mostly in Idaho), the Willamette River (in northwest Oregon), the Kootenay River (mostly in British Columbia), and the Pend Oreille River (mostly in northern Washington and Idaho, also known as the lower part of the Clark Fork). Each of these four averages more than 20,000 cubic feet per second (570 m^{3}/s) and drains an area of more than 20,000 square miles (52,000 km^{2}).

The Snake is by far the largest tributary. Its watershed of 108,000 square miles (280,000 km^{2}) is larger than the state of Idaho. Its discharge is roughly a third of the Columbia's at the rivers' confluence but compared to the Columbia upstream of the confluence the Snake is longer (113%) and has a larger drainage basin (104%).

The Pend Oreille River system (including its main tributaries, the Clark Fork and Flathead rivers) is also similar in size to the Columbia at their confluence. Compared to the Columbia River above the two rivers' confluence, the Pend Oreille-Clark-Flathead is nearly as long (about 86%), its basin about three-fourths as large (76%), and its discharge over a third (37%).

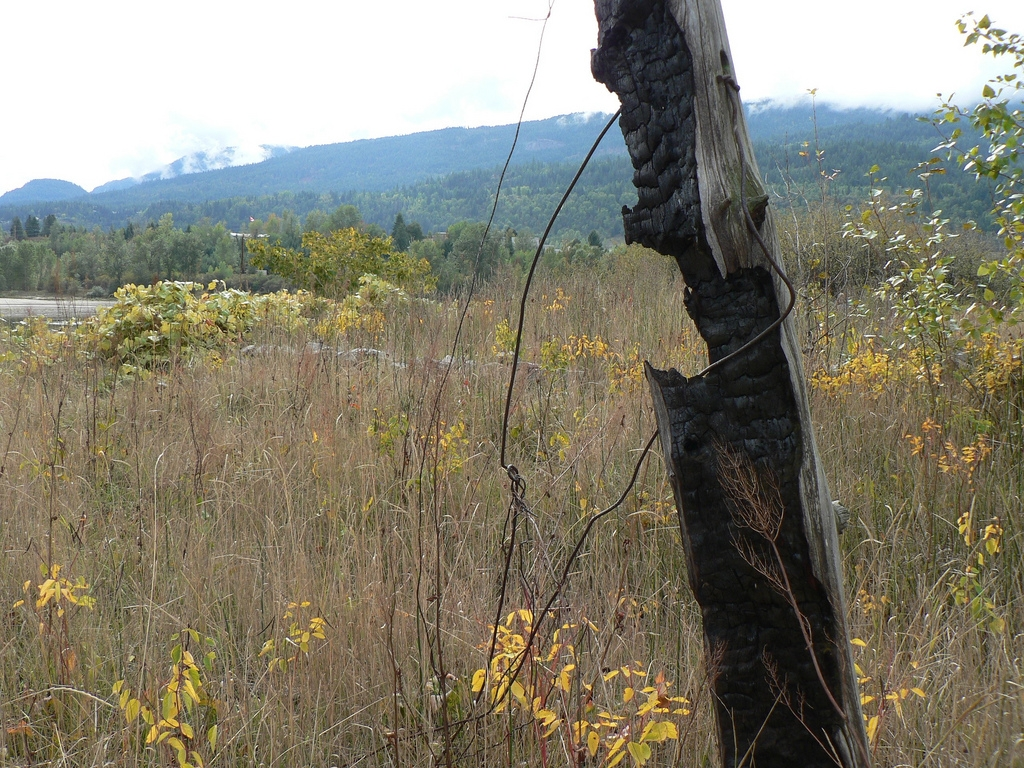
Kp'itl'els (Brilliant), Sinixt village site at the confluence of the Kootenay and Columbia Rivers

Tributary	Average discharge		Drainage basin	
	ft^{3}/s	m^{3}/s	mi^{2}	km^{2}
Snake River	56,900	1,610	107,500	278,400
Willamette River	37,400	1,060	11,500	29,780
Kootenay River (Kootenai)	30,650	868	19,420	50,300
Pend Oreille River	26,430	748	25,800	66,800
Cowlitz River	9,140	259	2,586	6,700
Spokane River	7,900	224	6,680	17,300
Lewis River	6,125	173	1,046	2,710
Deschutes River	5,845	166	10,700	27,700
Yakima River	3,542	100	6,150	15,900
Wenatchee River	3,079	87	1,350	3,500
Okanogan River	3,039	86	8,200	21,200
Kettle River	2,925	83	4,200	10,880
Sandy River	2,257	64	508	1,316
John Day River	2,060	58	8,010	20,750

== See also ==
- Columbia Park (Kennewick, Washington), a 400-acre (160 ha) recreational area
- Columbia River Estuary
- Columbia River Maritime Museum, Astoria, Oregon
- Empire Builder, an Amtrak rail line that follows the river from Portland to Pasco, Washington
- Estella Mine, an abandoned mine with a view of the Columbia River Valley
- Historic Columbia River Highway, a scenic highway on the Oregon side
- List of crossings of the Columbia River
- List of dams in the Columbia River watershed
- List of longest rivers of Canada
- List of longest rivers of the United States (by main stem)
- List of longest streams of Oregon
- Lists of ecoregions in North America and Oregon
- Lists of rivers of British Columbia, Oregon, and Washington
- Okanagan Trail, a historic trail that followed the Columbia and Okanagan rivers
- Robert Gray's Columbia River expedition
- Astoria Canyon, a submarine canyon which channels sediment from the Columbia River to the Astoria Fan
