= Federal Columbia River Power System =

The Federal Columbia River Power System (FCRPS) is a series of multi-purpose, hydroelectric facilities in the Pacific Northwest region of the United States, constructed and operated by the U.S. Army Corps of Engineers and the U.S. Bureau of Reclamation, and a transmission system built and operated by the Bonneville Power Administration (BPA) to market and deliver electric power. The program is currently funded by the BPA's power and transmission rates.

== See also ==
- List of dams in the Columbia River watershed
