= Estella Mine =

Former mine site near Wasa, British Columbia

- Location in British Columbia
- Location: Wasa, British Columbia, Canada; 49°46′10″N 115°36′19″W
- Products: Silver, Lead, Zinc, Cadmium, Copper, Gold
- Company: Estella Mines Ltd

The Estella Mine is a former mine site situated near Wasa, British Columbia at an elevation of 6,000 feet (1,800 m) on Tracy Creek.

The property was staked in the 1890s, and was explored briefly by Consolidated Mining and Smelting in 1927. Estella Mines Ltd. was formed by A.R. Allen in 1950, and the mill was built and commenced operation in 1951. Reserves calculated in 1951 were 47,800 tons with average width 5.8 feet (1.8 m) and grade 19% zinc, 5.8% lead, and 1.9 oz./ton silver. Milling was done at the rate of 150 tons/day, seven days per week, and 130 men were employed. The mill operated until February 1953, when reserves were depleted.

Additional exploration was conducted from 1954 to 1957, when the company, reorganized as United Estella Mines Ltd., was forced to liquidate. Copper Soo Mining Company acquired the property in 1962 and exploration to 1963 resulted in a shipment of about 1300 tons averaging 23.1% zinc, 13.2% lead and 7 oz/ton silver. (Western Miner, Oct. 1966, p. 28-35).

Exploration in 1965 and 1966 was successful in locating new ore, and a new mill was in operation in August 1966. Ore reserves at that time were 49,103 tons averaging 14.19% zinc, 7.01% lead, and 2.93 oz/ton silver, (17% mining dilution and 10% stope wall dilution included). Ore was mined by open stoping and shrinkage methods. Production to the end of 1967 totaled 51,391 tons milled averaging 7.67% zinc, 4.26% lead, 1.86 oz./ton silver, 0.02% Cadmium, and minor gold and copper. Total production was 120,704 tons of ore grading 8.97% zinc, 4.73% lead, and 1.74 oz./ton silver (Hoy, Prelim Map 38 B.C. MEMPR).

The site of the mine now exists abandoned but as a popular ATV and off-road trip for sightseers due to its excellent view of the Rocky Mountain Trench - leading to the construction of a hang gliding take off point that can be seen next to the road on the way up.
