= Wind Mountain (Washington) =

Mountain in Washington (state), United States

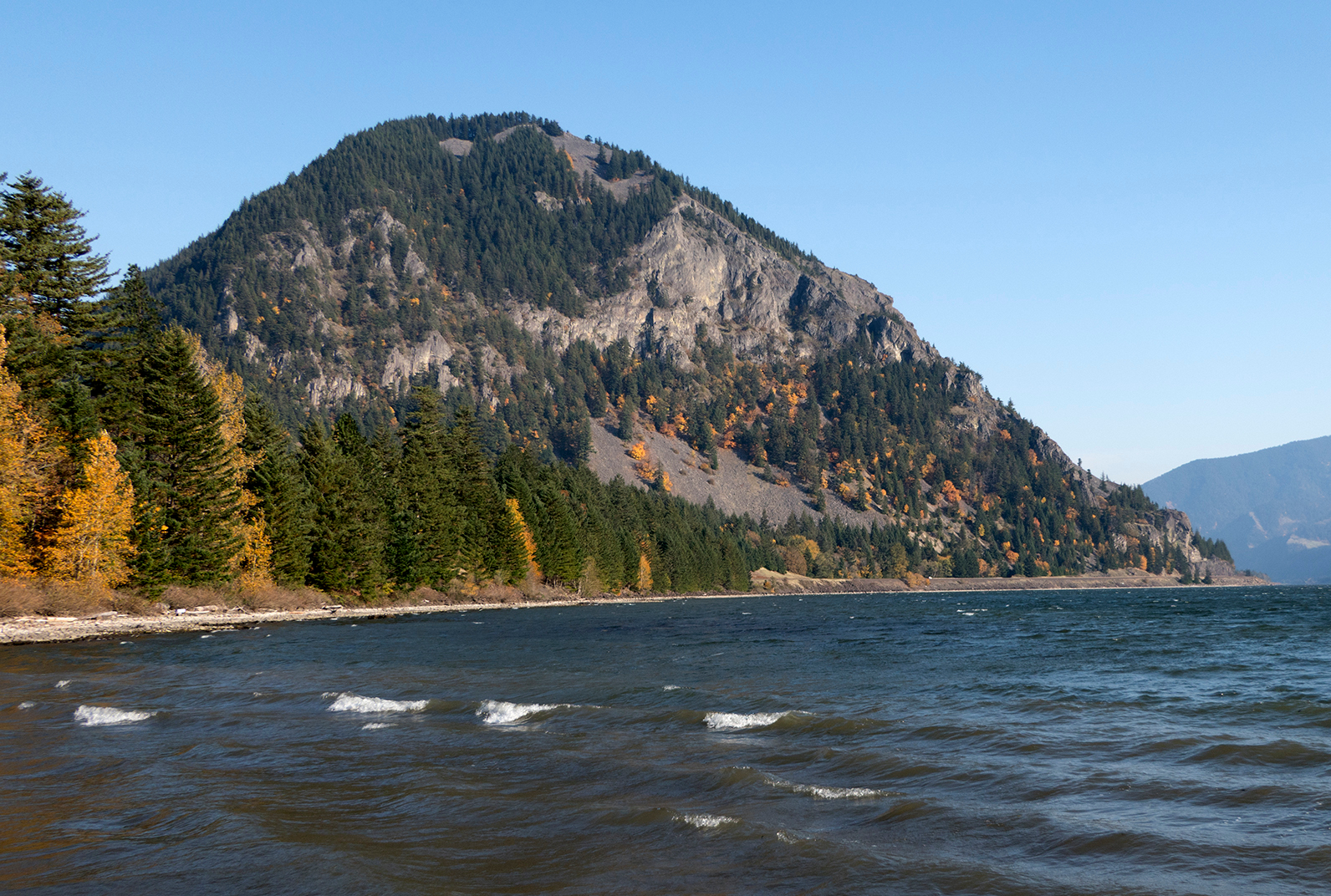
- West aspect

Highest point
- Elevation: 1,907 ft (581 m)
- Prominence: 947 ft (289 m)
- Isolation: 2.41 mi (3.88 km)
- Coordinates: 45°42′36″N 121°45′21″W

Geography
- Location within Washington (state) Location within the United States
- Location: Skamania County, Washington, U.S.
- Parent range: Cascade Range
- Topo map: USGS Carson

Geology
- Rock age: late Miocene to Pliocene
- Mountain type: intrusive igneous
- Rock type: quartz diorite

Climbing
- First ascent: Native Americans
- Easiest route: class 1 hiking trail

Wind Mountain is a 1,907-foot-elevation (581-meter) summit located in Skamania County of Washington state.

== Description ==
Wind Mountain is part of the Cascade Range and is set within the Columbia River Gorge, on land managed by Gifford Pinchot National Forest. The prominent landmark is situated three miles east of Carson, Washington, and two miles east of the mouth of Wind River. Precipitation runoff from Wind Mountain drains into the Columbia River. Topographic relief is significant as the south aspect rises 1,800 feet (550 meters) above the Columbia in one-half mile. Access to the mountain is via Washington State Route 14 and the 1.4-mile Wind Mountain Trail. From the summit there are views of Greenleaf Peak and Table Mountain to the west, as well as Dog Mountain to the east. The Wind Mountain Spirit Quest is a sacred archeological site near the summit created by Native American youths and dates back to 1000–200 years ago. This geographical feature's name has been officially adopted by the U.S. Board on Geographic Names, noting that the mountain is located in an area known for consistently high winds channeling through the Columbia River Gorge. According to Native American mythology, the Great Spirit set whirlwinds blowing in constant fury around Wind Mountain as punishment for those who had broken a taboo and taught white men how to snare salmon. The Lewis and Clark Expedition visited this area on October 30, 1805, where they observed a submerged forest at the base of this mountain, a relic of the Bonneville landslide which occurred six miles downstream.

== Climate ==
Wind Mountain is located in the marine west coast climate zone of western North America. Most weather fronts originate in the Pacific Ocean, and travel east toward the Cascade Mountains. As fronts approach, they are forced upward by the peaks of the Cascade Range (Orographic lift), causing them to drop their moisture in the form of rain or snowfall onto the Cascades. During winter months, weather is usually cloudy, but due to high pressure systems over the Pacific Ocean that intensify during summer months, there is often little or no cloud cover during the summer.

== Gallery ==
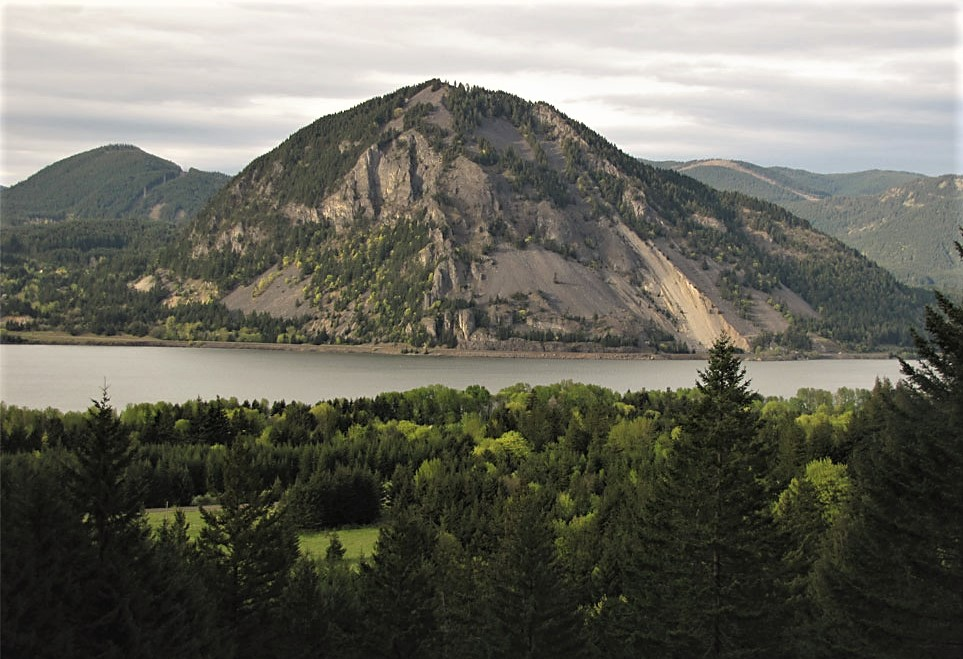
Wind Mountain seen from the Oregon side of the Columbia River

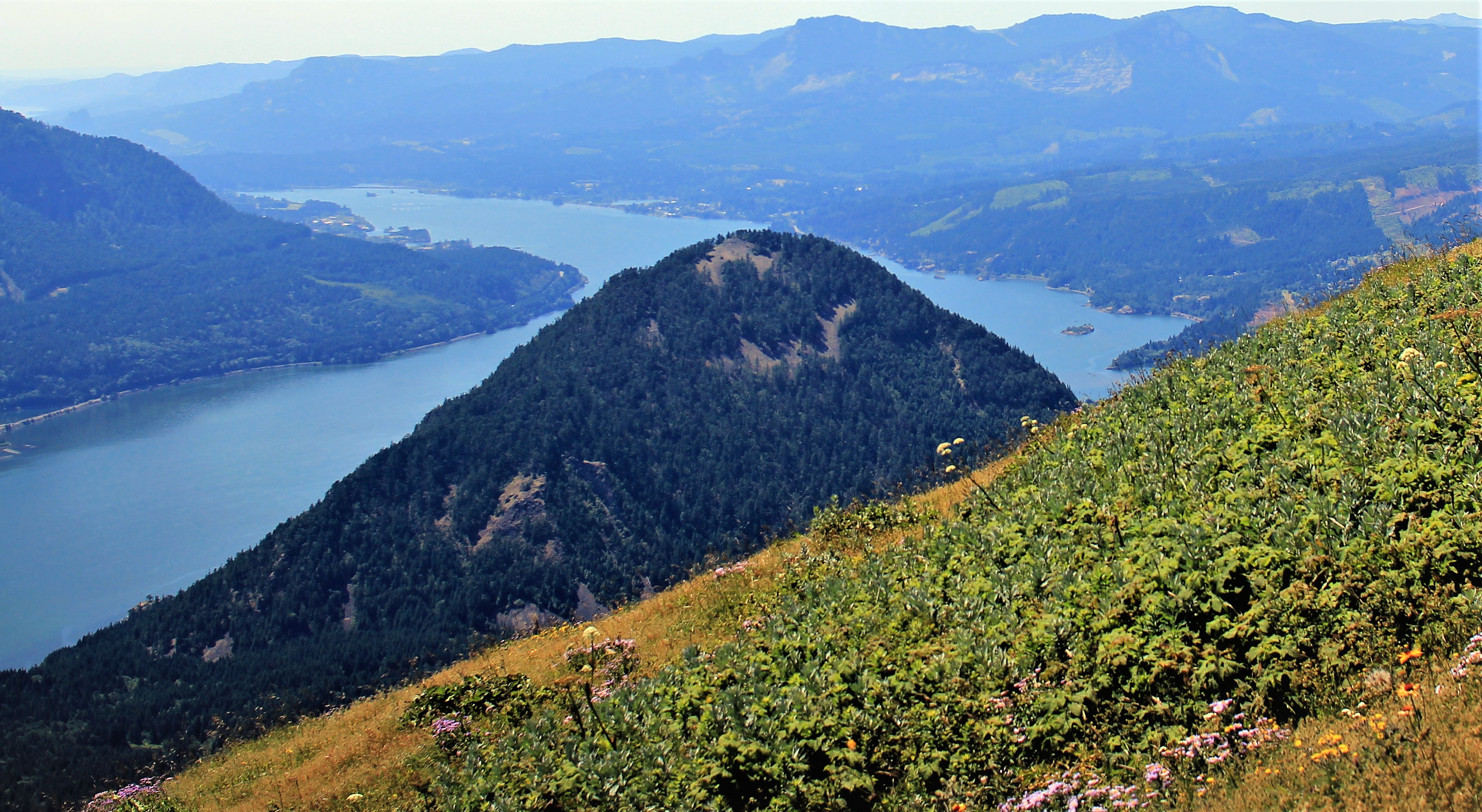
Columbia River and the top of Wind Mountain seen from the slopes of Dog Mountain

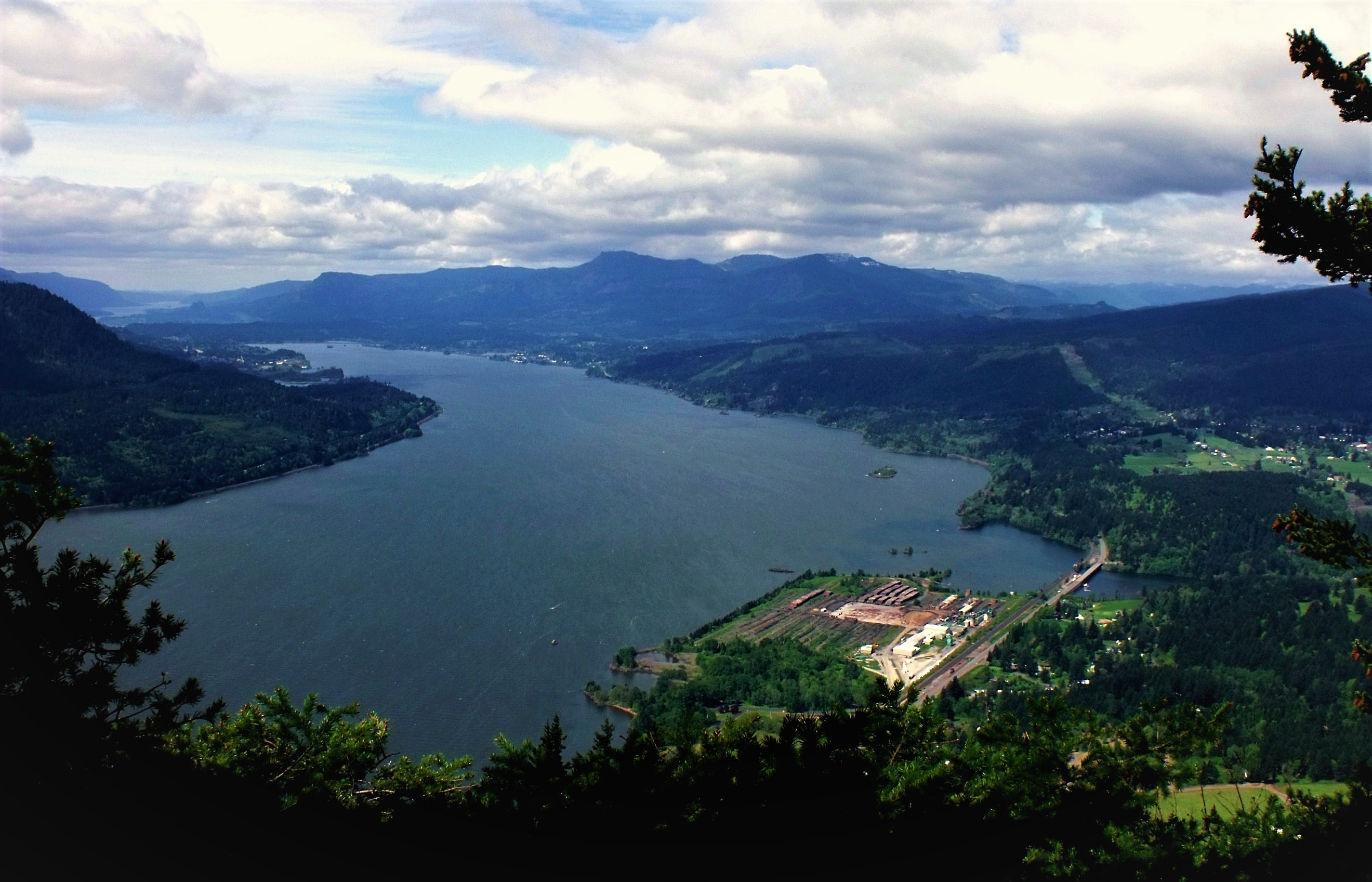
View from atop Wind Mountain looking west at the confluence of the Wind River (right) and the Columbia River (center).

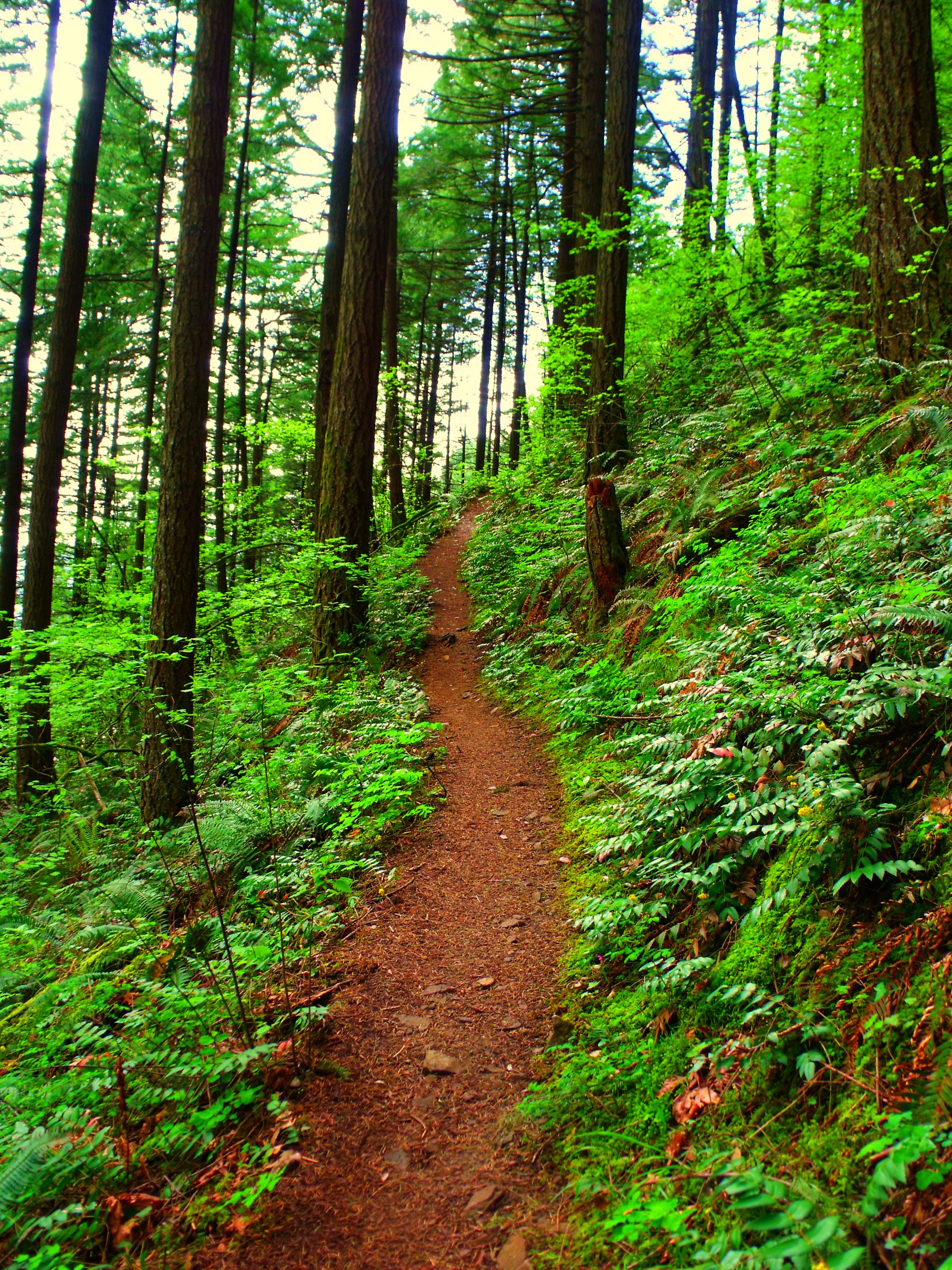
The trail on Wind Mountain passing through Douglas fir and swordfern

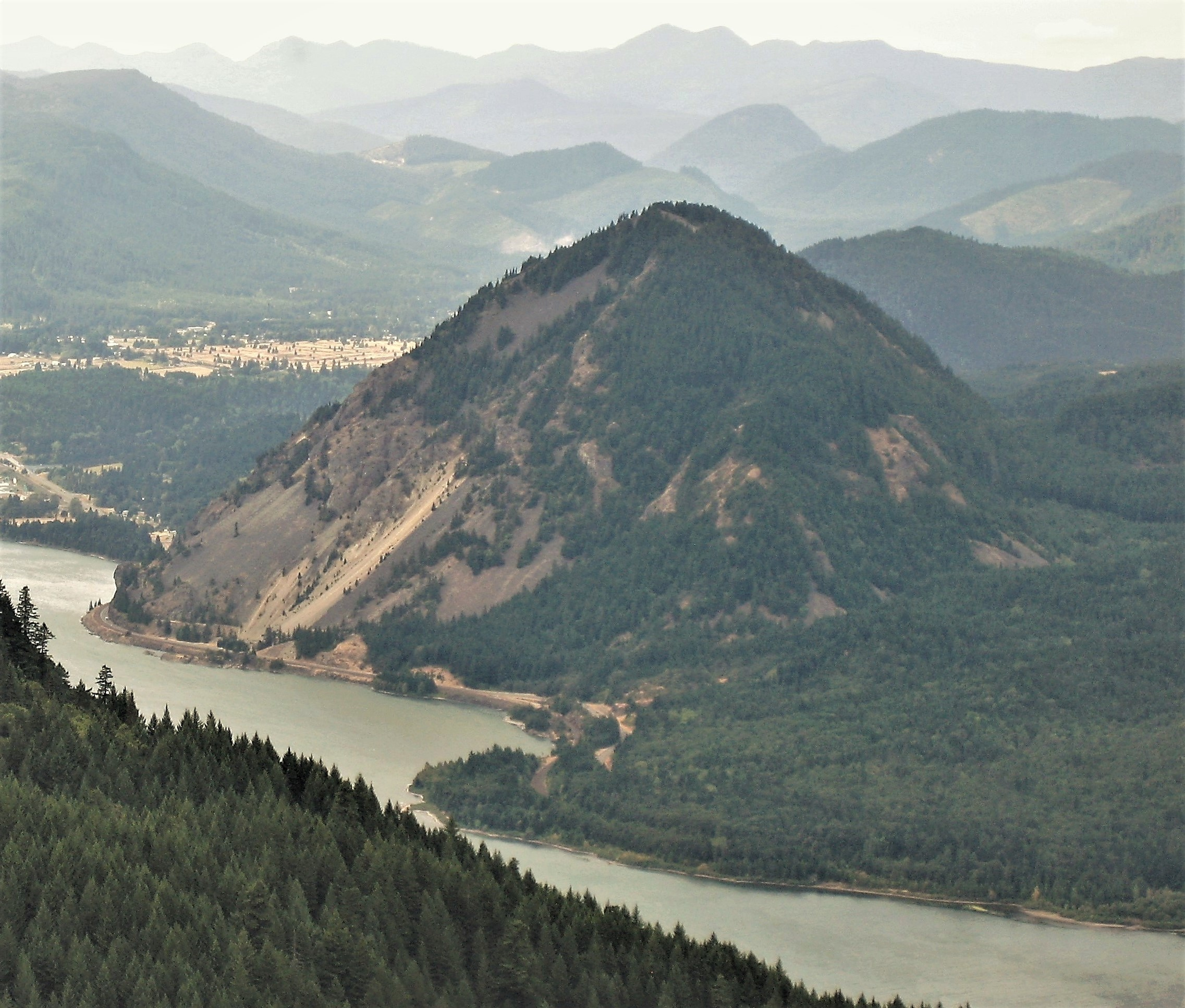
Southeast aspect of Wind Mountain seen from Starvation Ridge

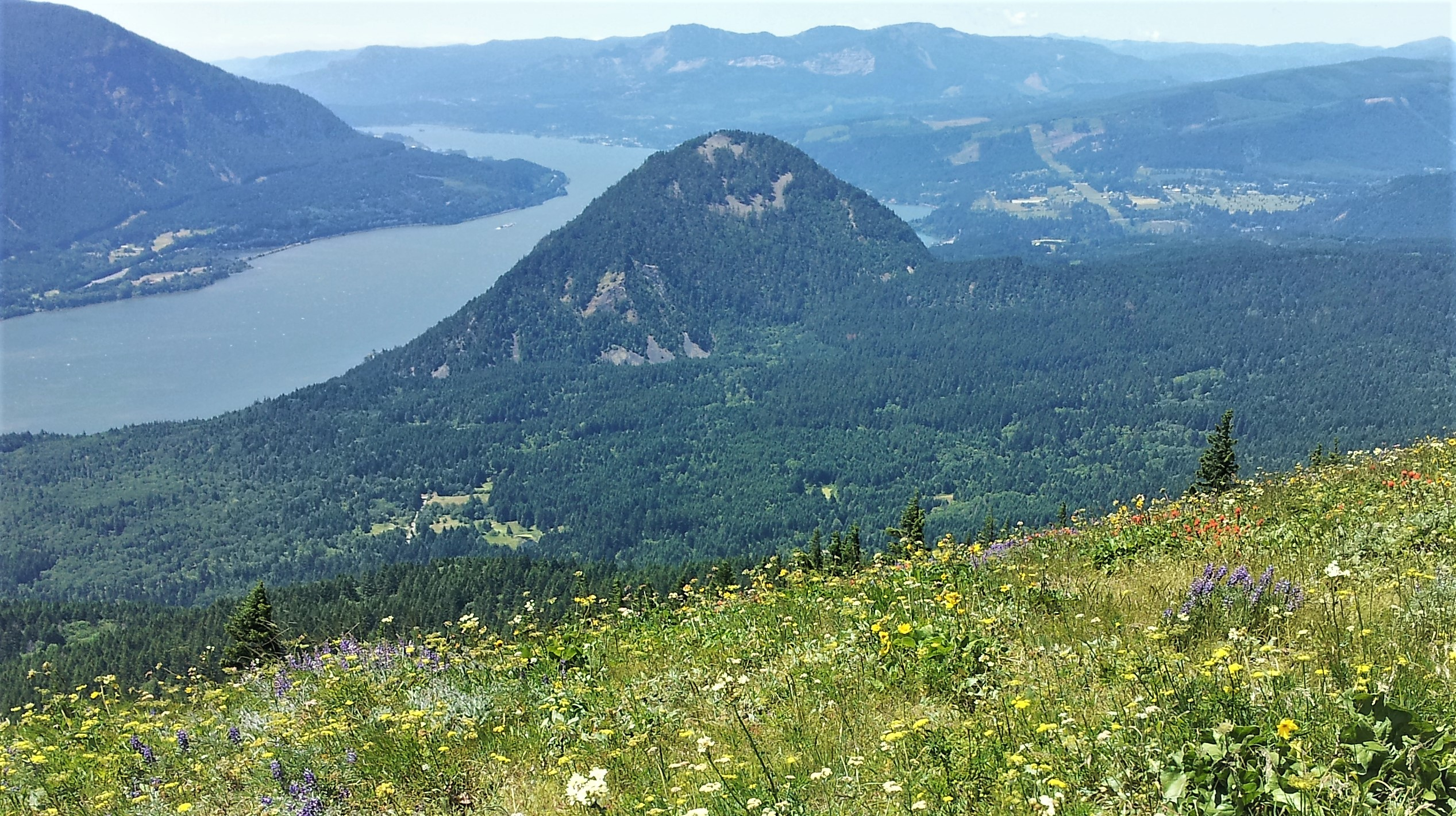
Wind Mountain seen from Dog Mountain

== See also ==
- Geology of the Pacific Northwest
- Lewis and Clark National Historic Trail
