= Bridge of the Gods =

Bridge of the Gods may refer to:

- Bridge of the Gods (land bridge), a former natural landslide dam in Oregon and Washington, United States, and the Native American legend that recalls the dam
- Bridge of the Gods (modern structure), a roadway bridge across the Columbia River between Oregon and Washington, United States
