= Fort Raines =

Coordinates: 45°39′09″N 121°55′06″W

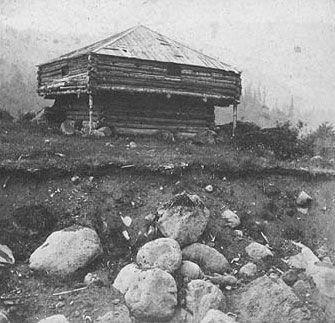
Fort Rains Blockhouse, 1867 (University of Washington Archive)

Fort Raines (spelled "Rains" on interpretive signs) was a United States Army blockhouse built in October 1855 to protect the portage road around the Cascades Rapids. It is located on the Washington side of the Columbia River, west of the Bridge of the Gods, at the "middle cascades." It was abandoned by 1857. The interpretive sign at the former site states that the post was "damp and lonely." Fort Raines was named for Brigadier General Gabriel J. Raines, who created anti-personnel mines for the Confederacy. Fort Raines had withstood the Cascades Massacre in 1856; but it was later destroyed in 1876. The only thing to remember Fort Raines was the Memorial Blockhouse that was erected near the original location in 1927. That too was destroyed and now there are only two informational signs near the site.

Fort Raines was one of several of forts built to protect this portage road. Others included Fort Cascades, located near present-day North Bonneville, Washington, and Fort Lugenbeel.
