= Sheridan State Scenic Corridor =

State park in the Columbia River Gorge, west of Cascade Locks, Oregon

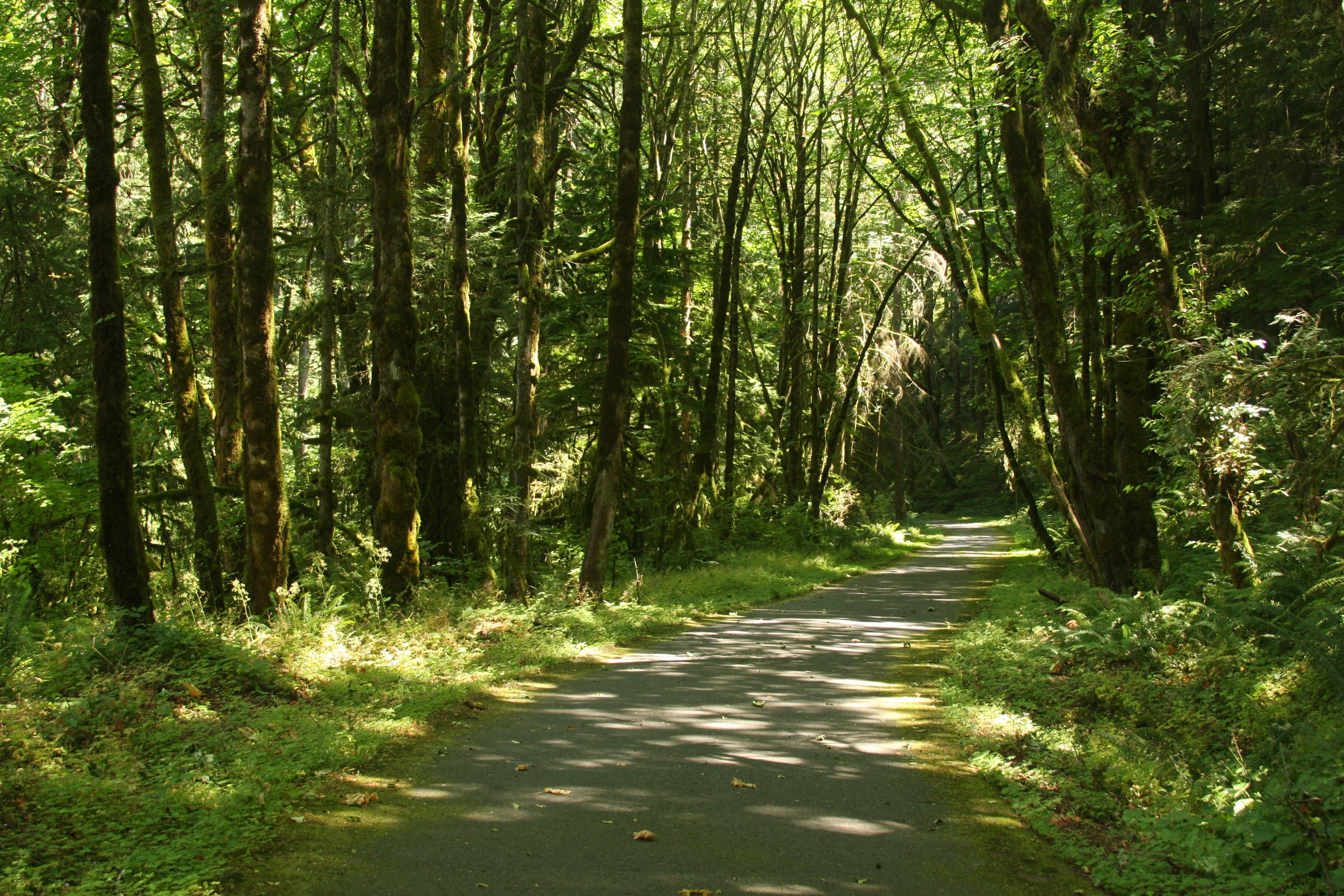
- Sheridan State Scenic Corridor, July 2010

- Location within Oregon Location within the United States
- Type: Public, state
- Location: Hood River County, Oregon
- Nearest city: Cascade Locks
- Coordinates: 45°38′57″N 121°54′24″W
- Operator: Oregon Parks and Recreation Department

Sheridan State Scenic Corridor is a state park in the Columbia River Gorge, west of Cascade Locks, Oregon. The 11-acre (4.5 ha) property, containing an old-growth forest, is located on the south side of Interstate 84 at approximately milepoint 42.5, and was not accessible by motor vehicle since I-84 was built in 1960. However, with the opening of the Eagle Creek-Cascade Locks segment of the Historic Columbia River Highway State Trail in 1998, it has become easily accessible by foot or bicycle. The park is on a triangular lot, surrounded by I-84 and the Mount Hood National Forest.

The park was acquired in 1923 from the Oregon-Washington Railroad and Navigation Company by the Parks Division of the State Highway Department, which named it for Philip H. Sheridan. It served as a wayside on US 30 - the Historic Columbia River Highway - until 1960, when the new I-84 freeway replaced the old road, cutting off access except through the national forest. As part of the restoration of the old highway, the Federal Highway Administration rebuilt the abandoned Eagle Creek-Cascade Locks for non-motorized traffic in the 1990s, to be managed by the State Parks and Recreation Department. An interpretive sign was installed at the site in 2007.

Just to the east of the park, within the national forest the trail passes under I-84 in a 150-foot (50 m) long precast concrete rock-faced tunnel (45.6501°N 121.9107°W). The $500,000 structure was built as part of the restoration project, and was required to connect the park to another intact piece of road, located north of I-84 at the west Cascade Locks interchange.

== See also ==
- List of Oregon state parks

Historic Columbia River Highway
Ruckel Creek Bridge; MP 42.7	Sheridan State Park; MP 44	Cascade Locks; MP 45-46
