= Cascade Locks and Canal =

Coordinates: 45.66850°N 121.89644°W

- Cascade Locks Marine Park
- U.S. National Register of Historic Places
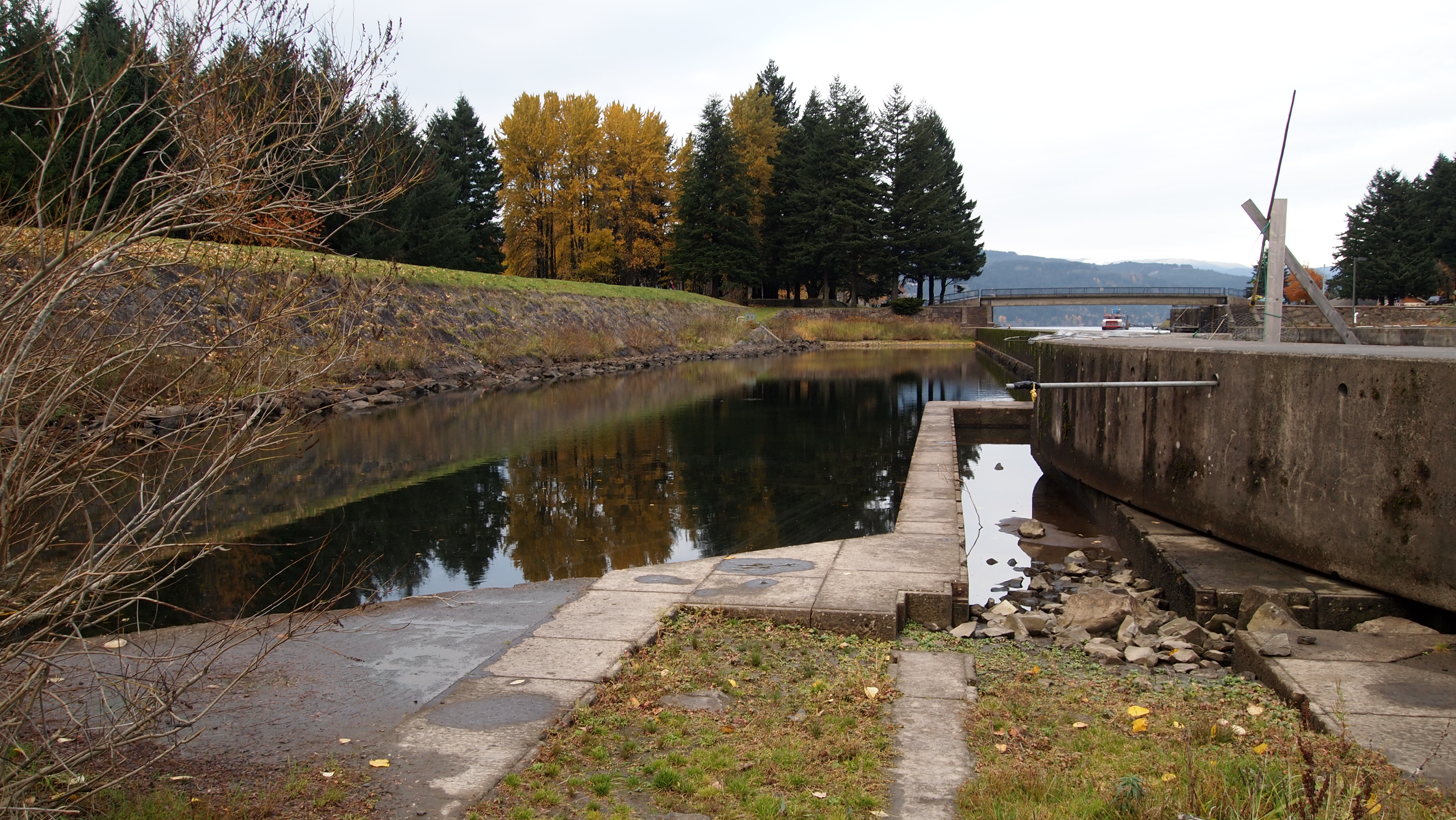
- Remnants of the locks as of 2011

- Location within Oregon Location within the United States
- Location: On the Columbia River, Cascade Locks, Oregon
- Area: 64.5 acres (26.1 ha)
- Built: 1896
- NRHP reference No.: 74001686
- Added to NRHP: May 15, 1974

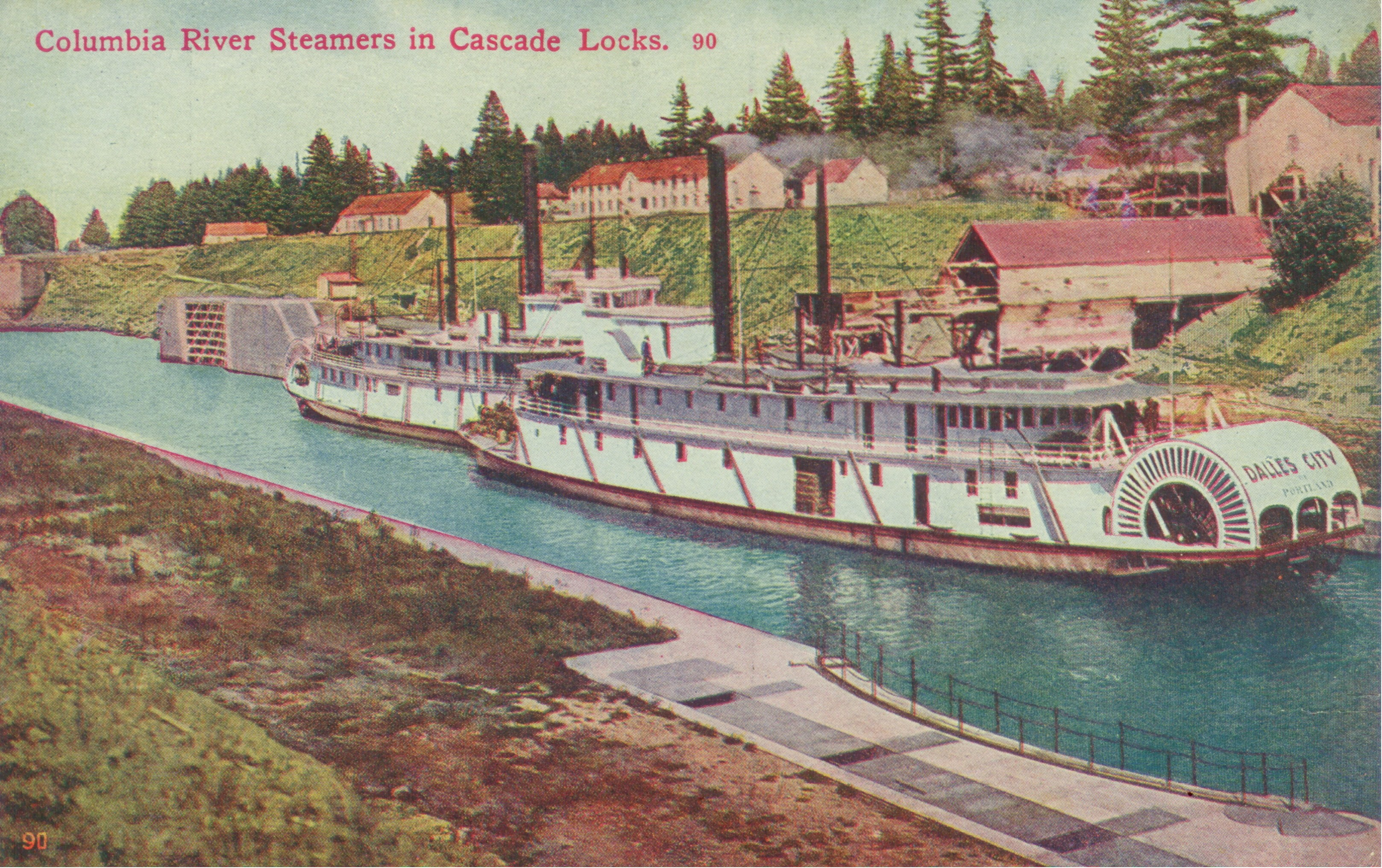
Dalles City and Regulator in Cascade Locks

The Cascade Locks and Canal was a navigation project on the Columbia River between the U.S. states of Oregon and Washington, completed in 1896. It allowed the steamboats of the Columbia River to bypass the Cascades Rapids, and thereby opened a passage from the lower parts of the river as far as The Dalles. The locks were submerged and rendered obsolete in 1938, when the Bonneville Dam was constructed, along with a new set of locks, a short way downstream.

== Design and construction ==
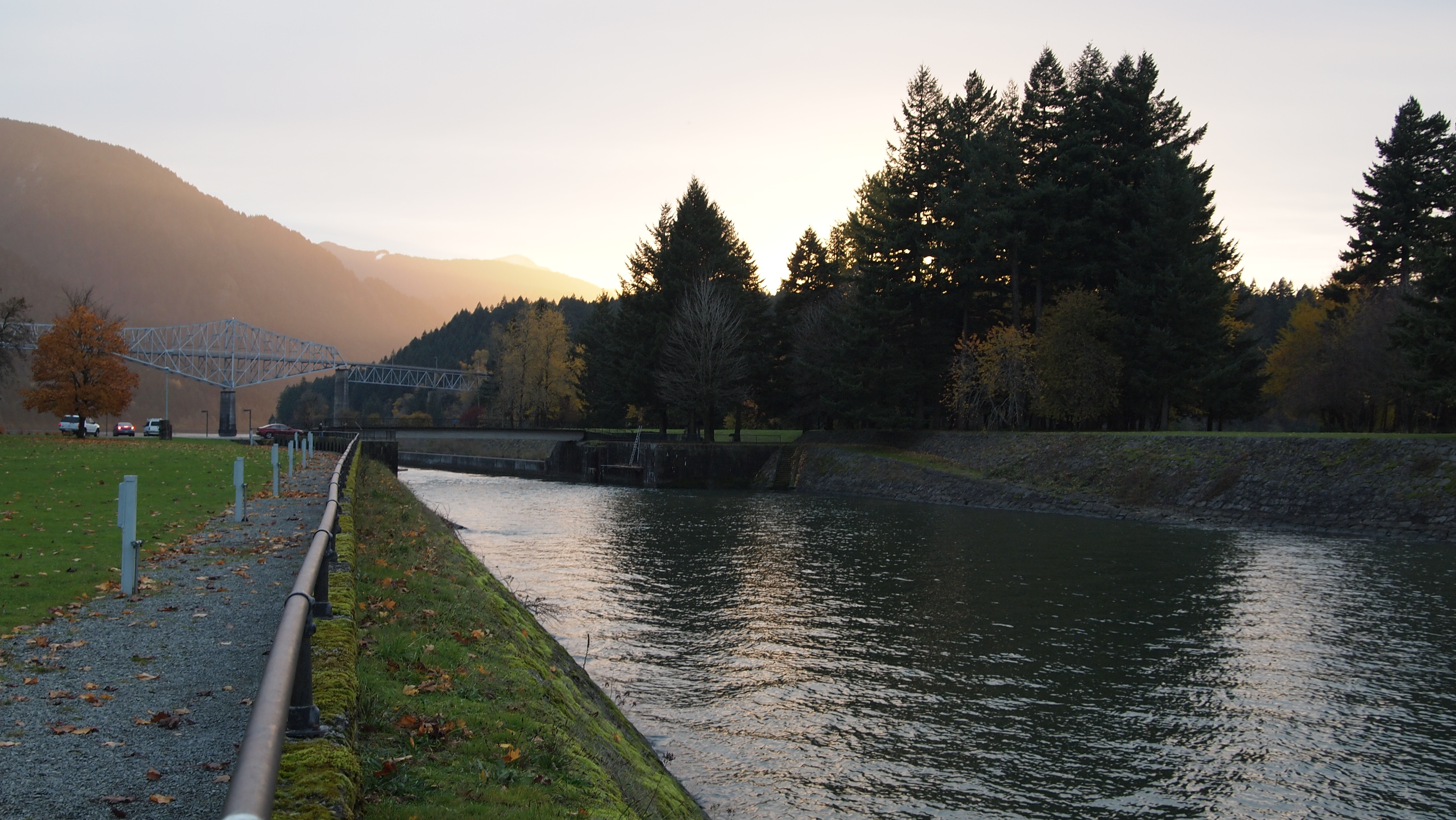
Sunset over the eastern lock entrance, now flooded

As rail competition grew, and forced steamboats off their old routes, shippers and steamboat lines began agitating Congress to allocate funds for improvements to the river, in the form of canals and locks, that would restore their competitive position relative to the railroads. The two main improvements sought on the Columbia were the Cascade Locks and, about twenty years later, the Celilo Canal and Locks.

Studies for a canal at the Cascades had begun in 1875, but interest tapered off when Oregon Railroad and Navigation Company (O.R.& N.) finished the railroad to The Dalles and took its boats off the middle river. Anti-monopoly shippers eventually got Congress to allocate funds in 1893 to begin the canal and locks at the Cascades, which were completed in November 1896. The locks had a lift chamber carved in solid rock 460 feet (140 m) long, and 90' wide, with 8 feet (2.4 m) of draft, deep enough for any vessel then on the river, and large enough to accommodate several at once. The locks could raise a vessel 14' at high water and 24' at low water.

The lock gates were 56 feet (17 m) wide and 90 feet (27 m) high. The locks were carefully designed to address the great variation in the height of the river, the difference between high and low water being 55 feet (17 m). This condition made it necessary to build a series of three sets of gates, increasing in height from the lower entrance to the huge upper guard gate, only two sets being used at one time. When the river was low, the upper guard gates remained open continually and the lower sets were operated. When the water rose enough to drown the lower gates, they were swung open and the lifting work was done by the others. The upper approach was formed by masonry wall extending from the guard gate in a long sweep of 1,200 feet (370 m), and the bank behind was armored against floods with riprapped stone.

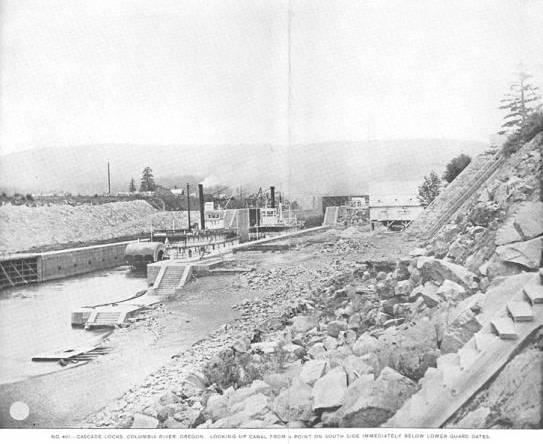
Cascade Locks, circa 1897, looking east, locks are functioning but bank work is still ongoing

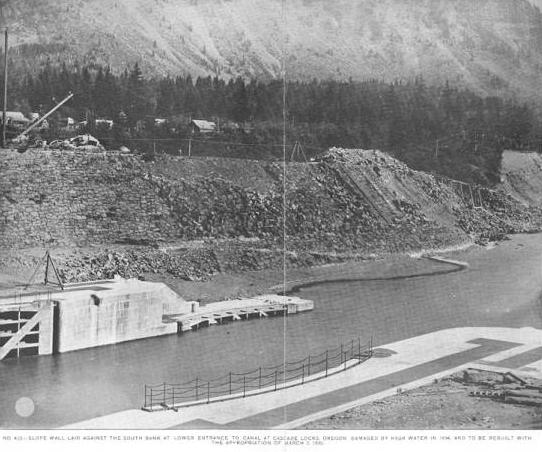
Cascade Locks, circa 1897, looking south and downriver across lower lock

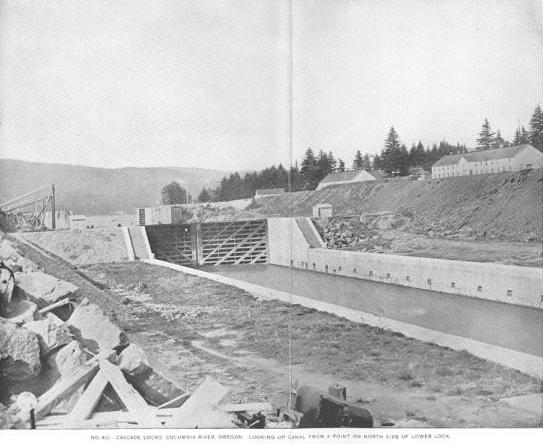
Cascade Locks, circa 1897, looking south, showing middle lock and lockmaster and engineer buildings on embankment on south side

== Effect on river traffic ==
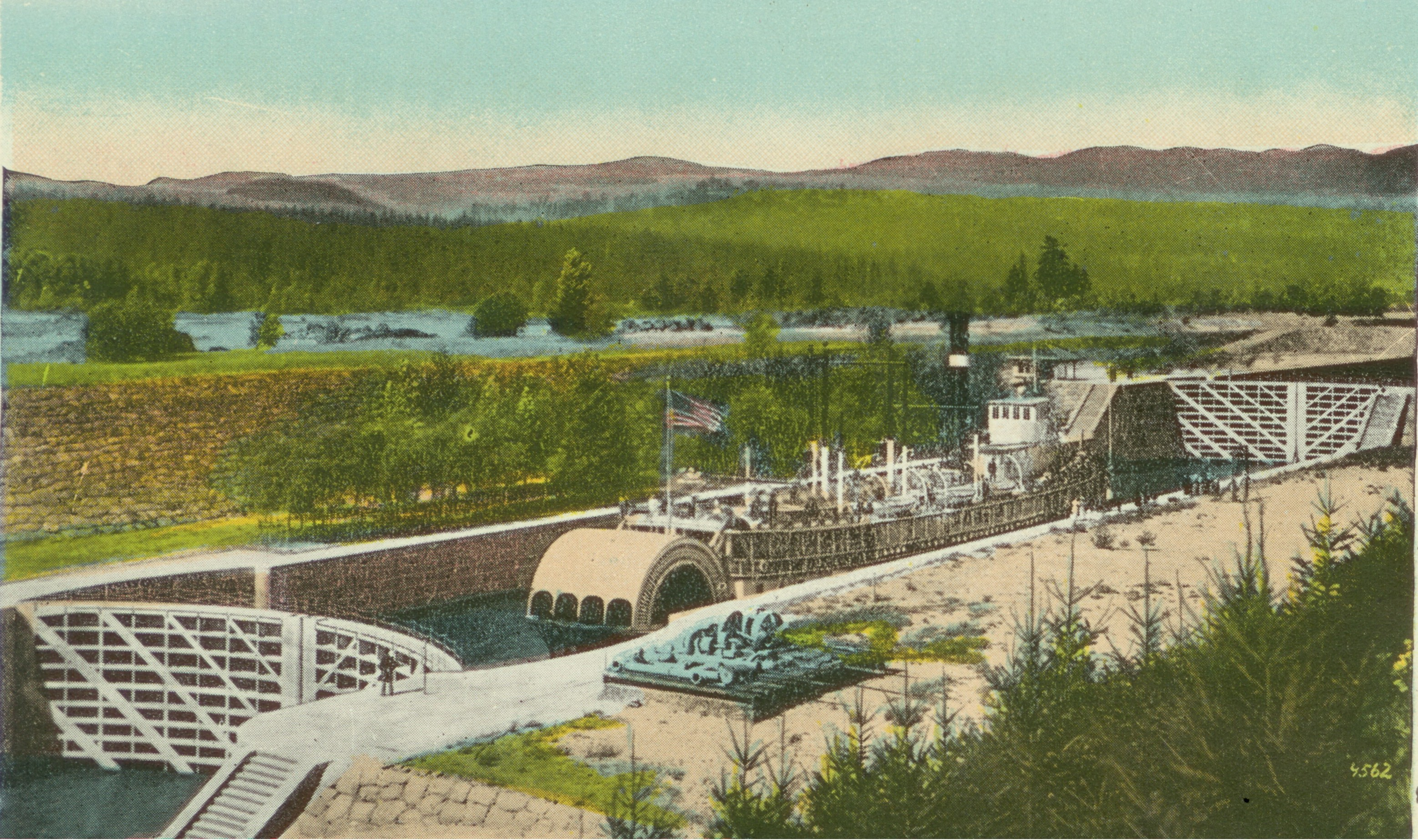
Bailey Gatzert in Cascade Locks, circa 1915, with Columbia River in background

In an 1897 article written shortly after their completion, Scientific American was optimistic about the future of the locks, saying:

With cheaper rates, adjacent counties will ship from here, and, considering that this is but one point on a river navigable for several hundred miles, we see that the total of the freight of this country is very large. Doubtless the railroads will still handle a large part of the business, but water transportation is always a most salutary regulator of freight rates, and everything consumed or produced in an area of probably 100,000 square miles (260,000 km^{2}) will be affected by these locks which open the great Columbia River to commerce. In particular will the vast quantity of wheat raised in Eastern Oregon and Washington feel the improved rates of transportation to the coast, whence it seeks a market in Europe. The people of the "Inland Empire" may well congratulate themselves on the completion of the Cascade Locks.

As it turns out, completion of the locks and the 3,000-foot (910 m) canal leading from the east end of the locks, produced some increase in traffic, but not as much increase in riverine traffic as had been hoped. The North Bank railroad was also completed along the Columbia, which took more business away from the boats. As a result, the Regulator Line, which had been running Dalles City, Regulator, and Bailey Gatzert on the lower Columbia, and, through the locks, on the middle Columbia, sold out to James J. Hill, owner of the Great Northern and other railroads. Not long later, in 1912, the Panama Canal Act made it illegal for a railroad to be owned in common with a competing steamboat line, so in 1915, Great Northern sold its boats.

== Current status ==
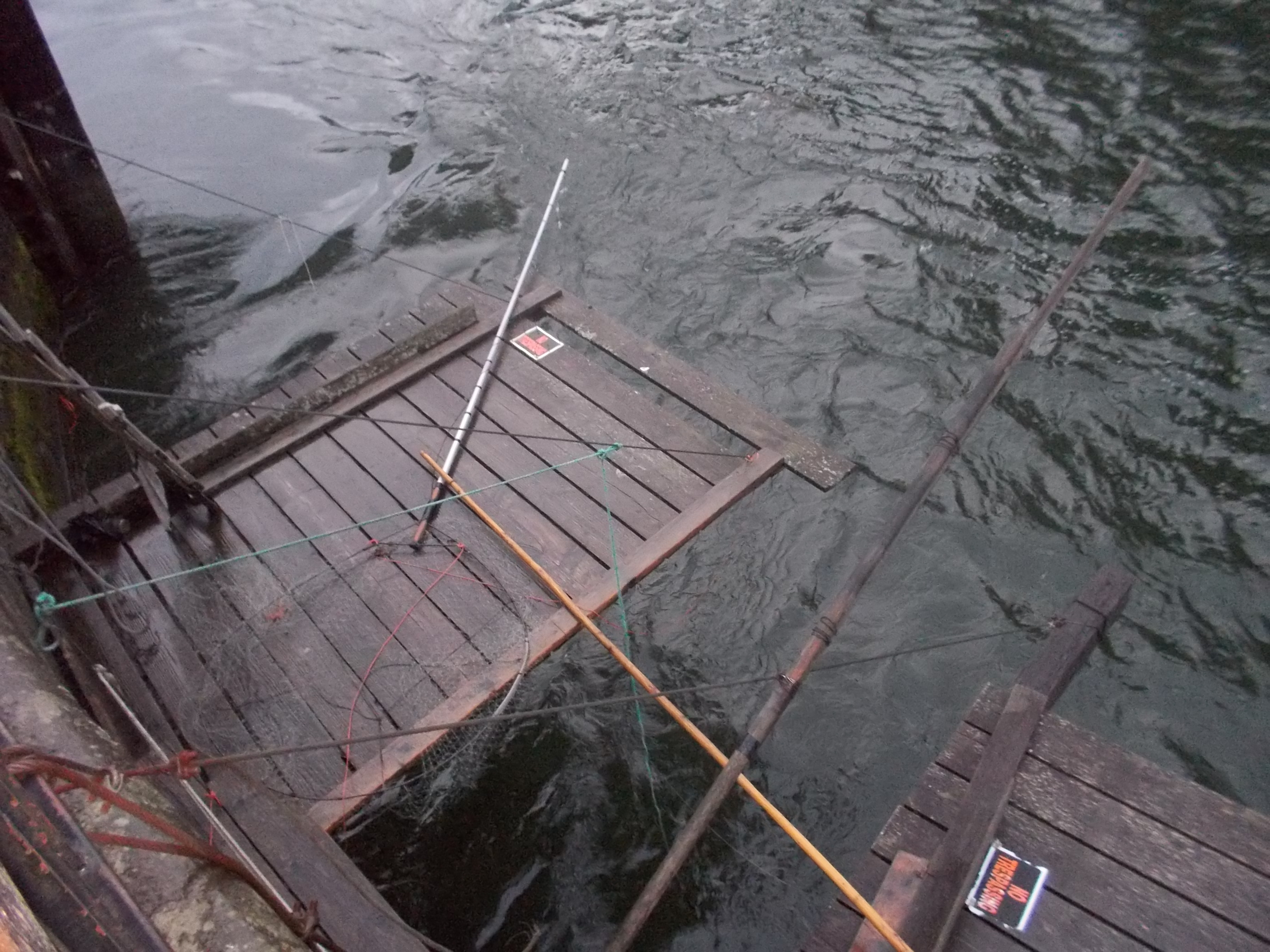
Dipnet fishing platforms on the canal

The lower lock and the canal were flooded when the Bonneville Dam was completed in the 1930s. The upper part of the higher lock is still visible and part of Cascade Locks Marine Park in the city of Cascade Locks, Oregon. The park is listed on the National Register of Historic Places.

== See also ==
- Celilo Canal
- Columbia Gorge
- Fort Cascades
- Steamboats of the Columbia River
- Shaver Transportation Company
