= Bridge of the Gods (land bridge) =

Historic natural dam

Coordinates: 45.6589°N 121.9162°W

The Bridge of the Gods was a landslide dam created by the Bonneville Slide, a major landslide that blocked the Columbia River near present-day Cascade Locks, Oregon in the Pacific Northwest of the United States. The river eventually breached the bridge and washed much of it away, but the event is remembered in legends of local Native Americans as the Bridge of the Gods.

Bonneville Landslide / Bridge of the Gods

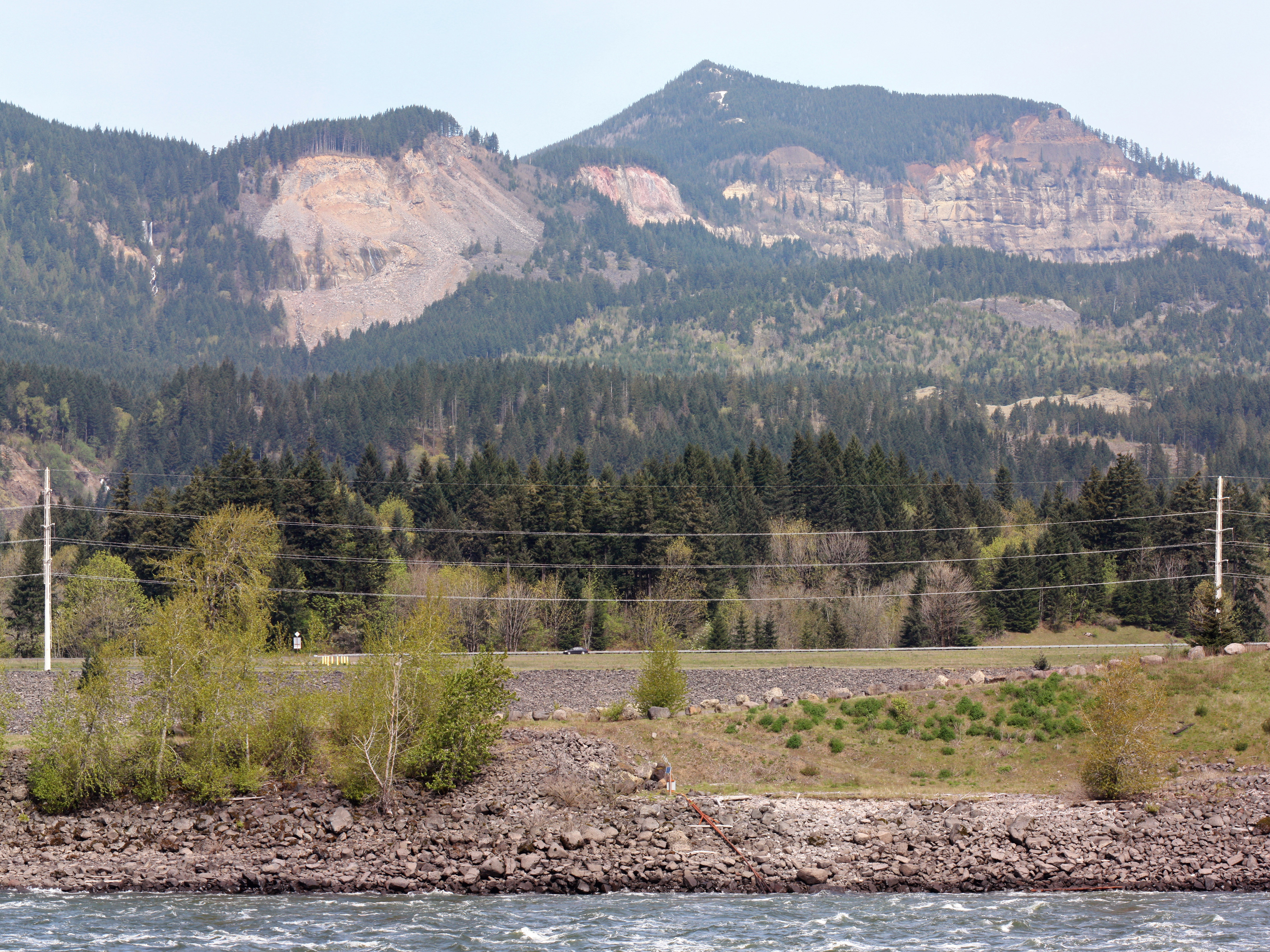
Greenleaf Peak and the Bonneville landslide from Bonneville Dam

The feature provided the name for a modern-day bridge across the Columbia River between Oregon and Washington.

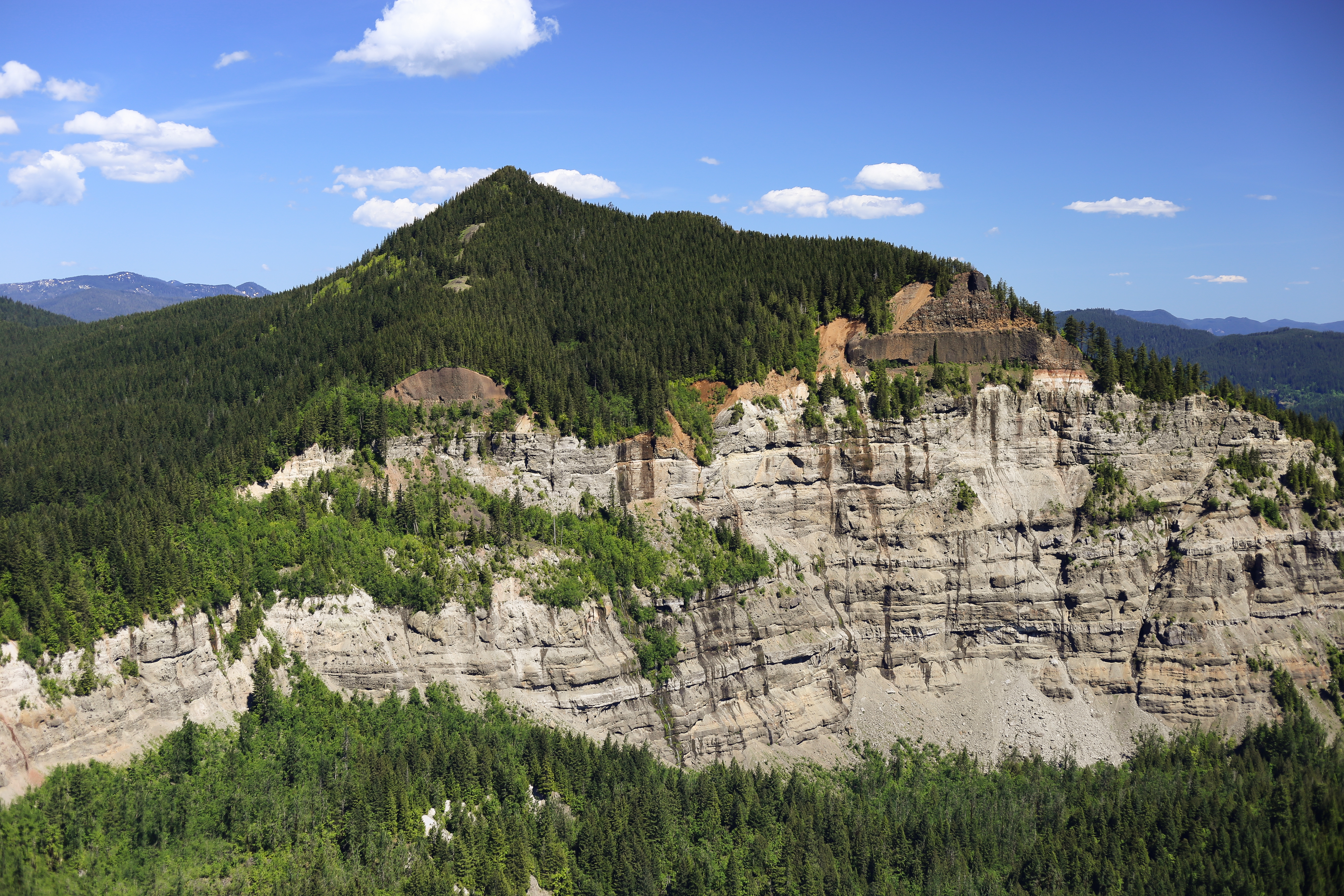
The southern face of Greenleaf Peak

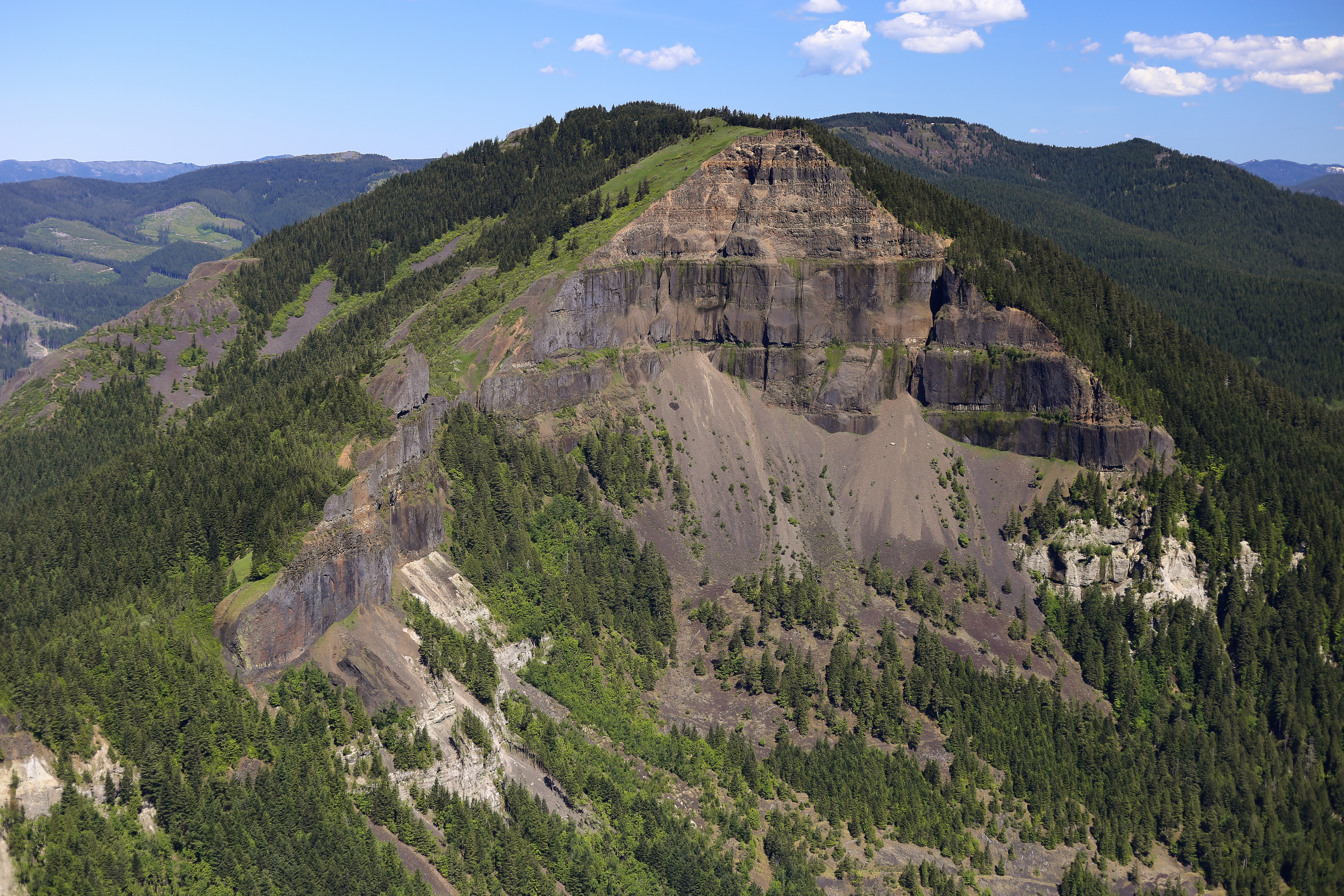
The southern face of Table Mountain

== Geologic history ==
Interpretations of the age of the Bonneville landslide have evolved as more investigators have studied it and as more modern dating techniques have become available. Early work based on dendrochronology and radiocarbon dating suggested the landslide occurred between AD 1060 and 1180 or between 1250 and 1280. The year 1100 has often been cited as the date of the Bonneville landslide. More recent work using radiocarbon dating and lichenometry has suggested dates between 1500 and 1760 or between 1670 and 1760. These younger radiocarbon ages permitted a possible link to the 1700 Cascadia earthquake. However, more recent investigations using radiocarbon dating and dendrochronology show the landslide occurred around 1450, that could be associated with an earlier great earthquake that occurred in the mid-fifteenth century.

The Bonneville landslide sent a large amount of debris south from Table Mountain and Greenleaf Peak, covering more than 5.5 square miles (14 km^{2}). The debris slid into the Columbia Gorge close to modern-day Cascade Locks, Oregon, blocking the Columbia River with a natural dam approximately 200 feet (61 m) high and 3.5 miles (5.6 km) long. The impounded river formed a lake and drowned a forest of trees for about 35 miles (56 km). Native Americans might have crossed the river on the dam or, as their oral histories say, a bridge. Although no one knows how long it took, the Columbia River eventually broke through the dam and washed away most of the debris, forming the Cascades Rapids, themselves submerged in 1938 by the construction of the Bonneville Dam. Geologists have determined that debris from several distinct landslides in the same area overlap, forming what is called the Cascades landslide complex. The Bonneville landslide was the most recent, and perhaps the largest landslide of the complex. Studies to understand the nature of the landslide complex and to map the lobes of individual landslide events were undertaken during the 1960s and 1970s. The composite nature of the landslide complex may explain the early discrepancies between date estimates of the Bonneville Landslide.

== Native American legend ==
Native American lore contains numerous legends to explain the eruptions of Mount St. Helens and other volcanoes in the Cascade Volcanic Arc. The most famous of these is the Bridge of the Gods legend told by the Klickitats. In their tale, the chief of all the gods, Tyhee Saghalie and his two sons, Pahto (also called Klickitat) and Wy'east, traveled down the Columbia River from the Far North in search of a suitable area to settle.

They came upon an area that is now called The Dalles and thought they had never seen a land so beautiful. The sons quarreled over the land and to solve the dispute, their father shot two arrows from his mighty bow; one to the north and the other to the south. Pahto followed the arrow to the north and settled there while Wy'east did the same for the arrow to the south. Saghalie then built Tanmahawis, the Bridge of the Gods, so his family could meet periodically.

When the two sons of Saghalie both fell in love with a beautiful maiden named Loowit, she could not choose between them. The two young chiefs fought over her, burying villages and forests in the process. The area was devastated and the earth shook so violently that the huge bridge fell into the river, creating the Cascades Rapids of the Columbia River Gorge.

For punishment, Saghalie struck down each of the lovers and transformed them into great mountains where they fell. Wy'east, with his head lifted in pride, became the volcano known today as Mount Hood, and Pahto, with his head bent toward his fallen love, was turned into Mount Adams. The fair Loowit became Mount St. Helens, known to the Klickitats as Louwala-Clough which means "smoking or fire mountain" in their language (the Sahaptin called the mountain Loowit).

== See also ==
- Geology of the Pacific Northwest
