= Fort Cascades =

Coordinates: 45.6404268°N 121.9640766°W

- North Bonneville Archeological District
- U.S. National Register of Historic Places
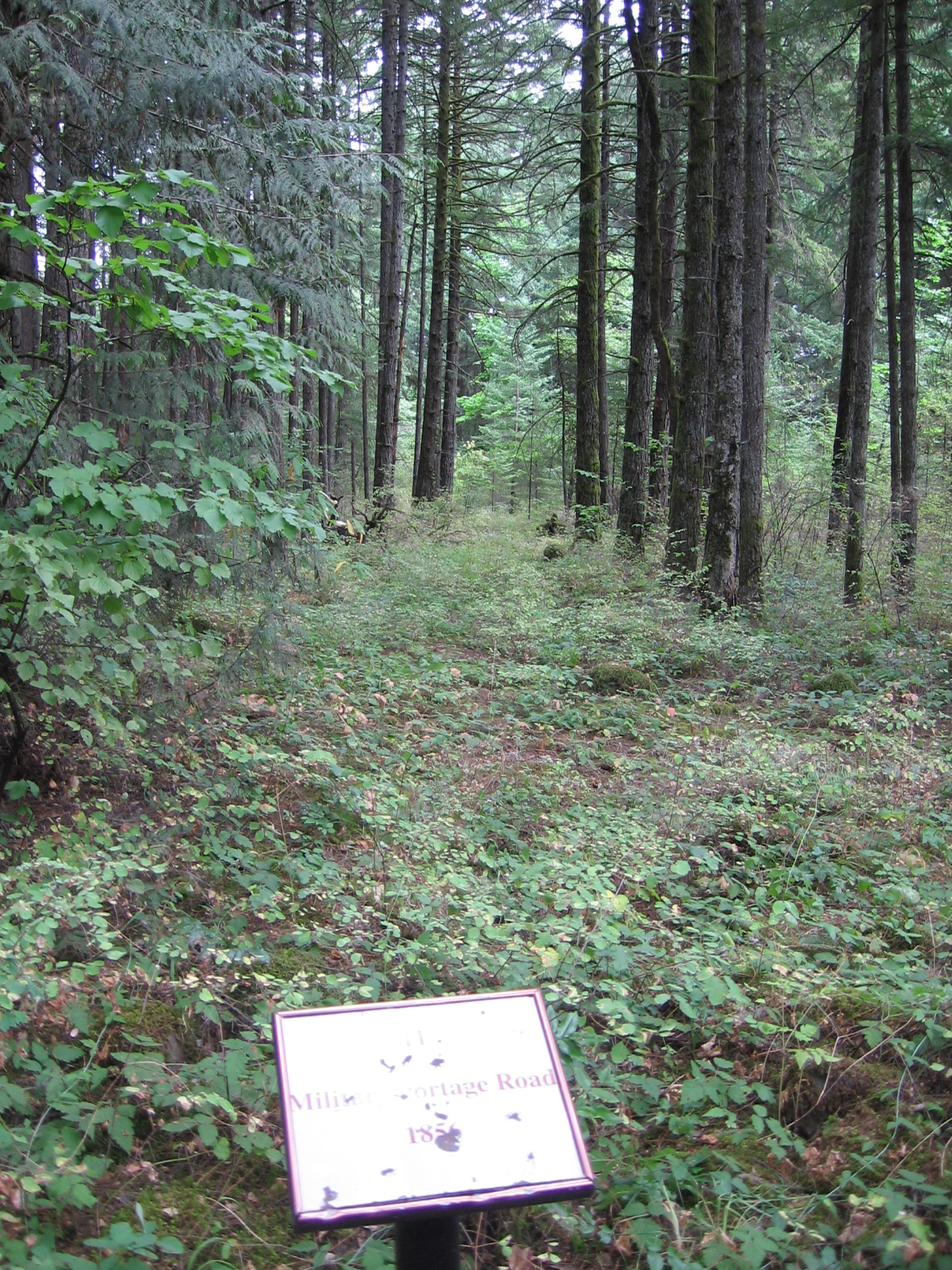
- Remnants of the military portage road, 2006

- Location within Washington (state)
- Nearest city: North Bonneville, Washington
- Area: 69.1 acres (28.0 ha)
- NRHP reference No.: 87000498
- Added to NRHP: February 2, 1987

Fort Cascades was a United States Army fort constructed in 1855 to protect the portage road around the final section of the Cascades Rapids, known as the "lower cascades." It was built on the Washington side of the Columbia River, between the present site of North Bonneville and the Bonneville Dam in Skamania County.

== History ==
Fort Cascades first began in 1850, burned in 1856, and was eventually vacated by the army in 1861. A small community, Cascades, was formed around the fort and during its peak, was home to 130 residents. Harvesting fish from the Columbia, as well as rail work, were the primary economic forces in the small town. Cascades served as the county seat of Skamania County prior to 1893, when the county records were moved to Stevenson; the records were reported as not being moved voluntarily as they were stolen during a night break-in at the Cascades courthouse. The largest flood of the Columbia River in recorded history passed over both the townsite and the fort site in 1894; the town was never rebuilt.

In 1867, decades before the disastrous floods, famed photographer Carleton Eugene Watkins arrived on the scene. Watkins took a commission from the Oregon Steam Ship Navigation Company to document areas of the Columbia River, with "Cascades" featuring prominently in his Pacific Coast stereoviews collection. Approximately 50 Watkins stereoscopic images of the Cascades area are known to exist, ranging from serials 1250–1302. Labeled "Upper Cascades," "Cascades" and "Lower Cascades," these photographs feature river view landscapes as well as images of the town and fort blockhouses. Aside from capturing scenery, Watkins documents saw mills, as well as train and riverboat traffic vital to the local economy at that time. A few of the images provide a glimpse of salmon fishing before the rapids were submerged by the construction of the Bonneville Dam. Although his negatives were destroyed in the great 1906 San Francisco earthquake, many of his printed images can be found in museums and private collections around the world.

The 21-acre (8.5 ha) grounds of Fort Cascades was listed on the National Register of Historic Places in 1987. In 1998, the United States Army Corps of Engineers (USACE) began a $28.8 million build of a fish passage through the original fort location. The work, meant to ferry juvenile salmon around the Bonneville Dam, was approved by the Washington State Historic Preservation Office; some of the rail tracks were demolished and the grounds where the fort's jail was located was destroyed. A 1.5-mile (2.4 km) looped trail courses through the remain of the fort and townsite. There is also a replica of a rock covered with petroglyphs that was originally located at the site but has since been moved to Stevenson.

Fort Cascades is one of several forts built to protect the portage around the Cascade Rapids. Others are Fort Raines and Fort Lugenbeel.
