= Greenleaf Peak =

Mountain in Washington (state), United States

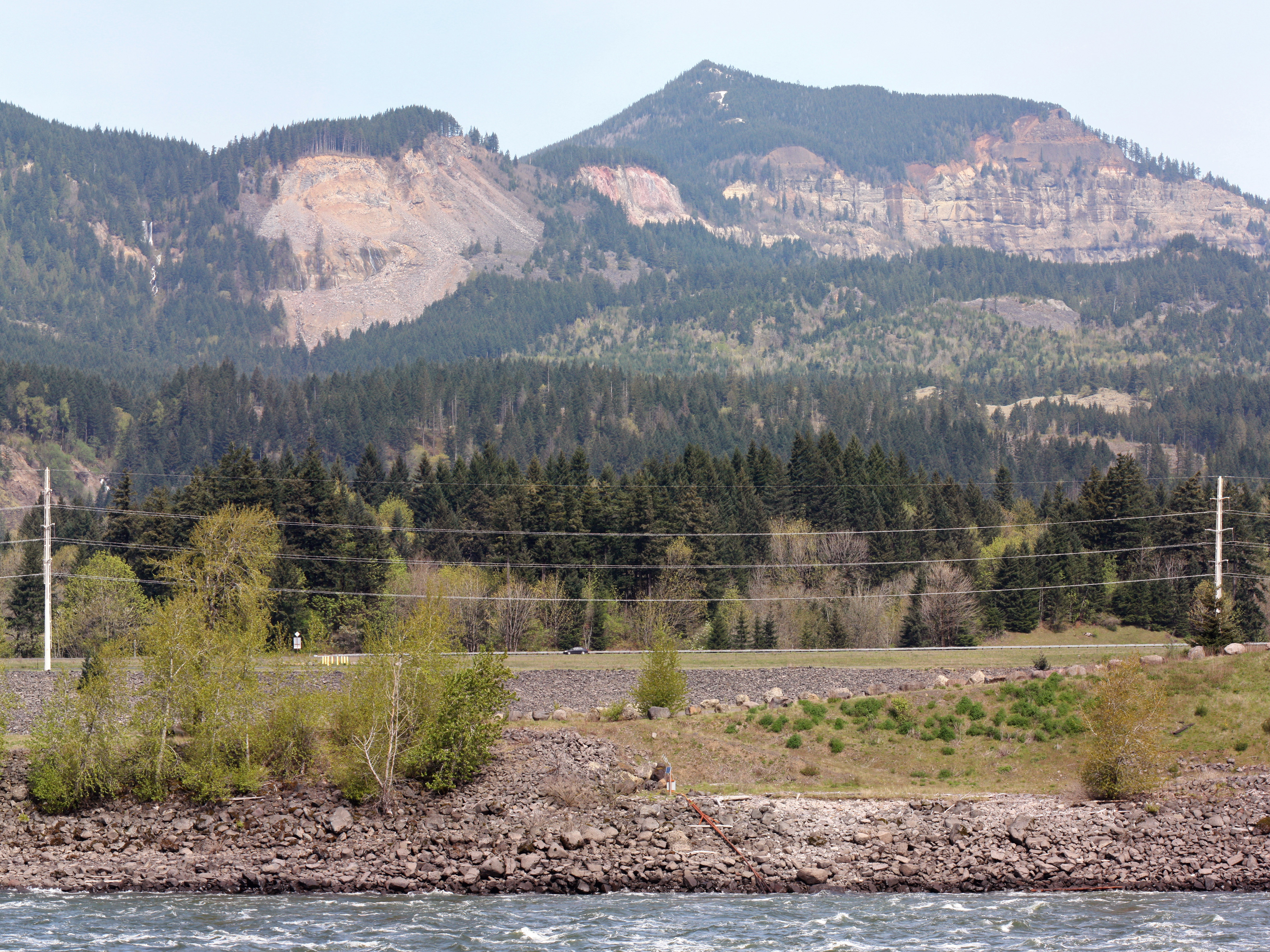
- Southeast slope of Greenleaf Peak, Red Bluffs and the Columbia River from Bonneville Dam

Highest point
- Elevation: 3,424 ft (1,044 m) NAVD 88
- Coordinates: 45°42′50″N 121°58′01″W

Geography
- Location within Washington (state)
- Location: Skamania County, Washington, U.S.
- Parent range: Cascade Range
- Topo map: USGS Bonneville Dam

Greenleaf Peak is a mountain in the Cascade Range in the U.S. state of Washington, located on the north side of the Columbia River near Table Mountain, in the Columbia River Gorge. The peak lies within the Columbia River Gorge National Scenic Area near Bonneville Dam. It is 3,424 feet (1,044 m) in elevation. Botanist David Douglas climbed to the summit in September 1825, making this the first recorded mountain ascent in what is now Washington state.

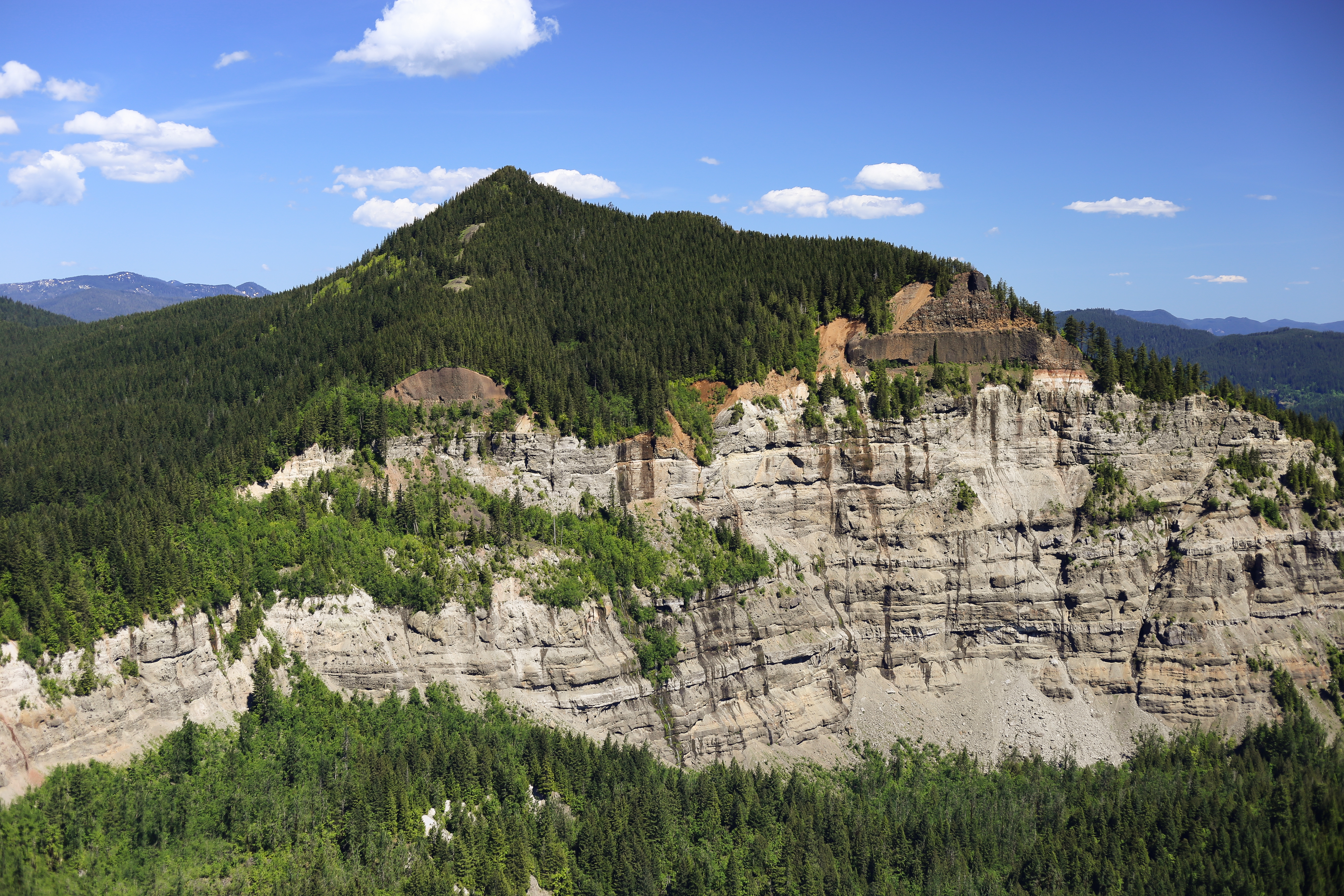
An aerial view of the south face of Greenleaf Peak.

Just south of the summit of Greenleaf Peak there is a dramatic escarpment called Red Bluffs, which connects Greenleaf Peak and Table Mountain. Approximately 1,300 feet (400 m) of the Eagle Creek formation are exposed at Red Bluffs. The Red Bluffs escarpment was created by the repeated collapse of Greenleaf Peak and Table Mountain. Massive landslides have fallen from the mountains, creating a 12-to-14-square-mile (31 to 36 km^{2}) area of debris called the Cascade Landslide Complex. The largest and most studied landslide is known as the Bonneville Slide, which created the Bridge of the Gods and Cascade Rapids The topography of the landslide complex is uneven with roughly rolling hills and abrupt slopes. The whole area is inclined south toward and beyond the Columbia River. There may have been a cinder cone between Greenleaf Peak and Table Mountain which collapsed during the Bonneville Slide.

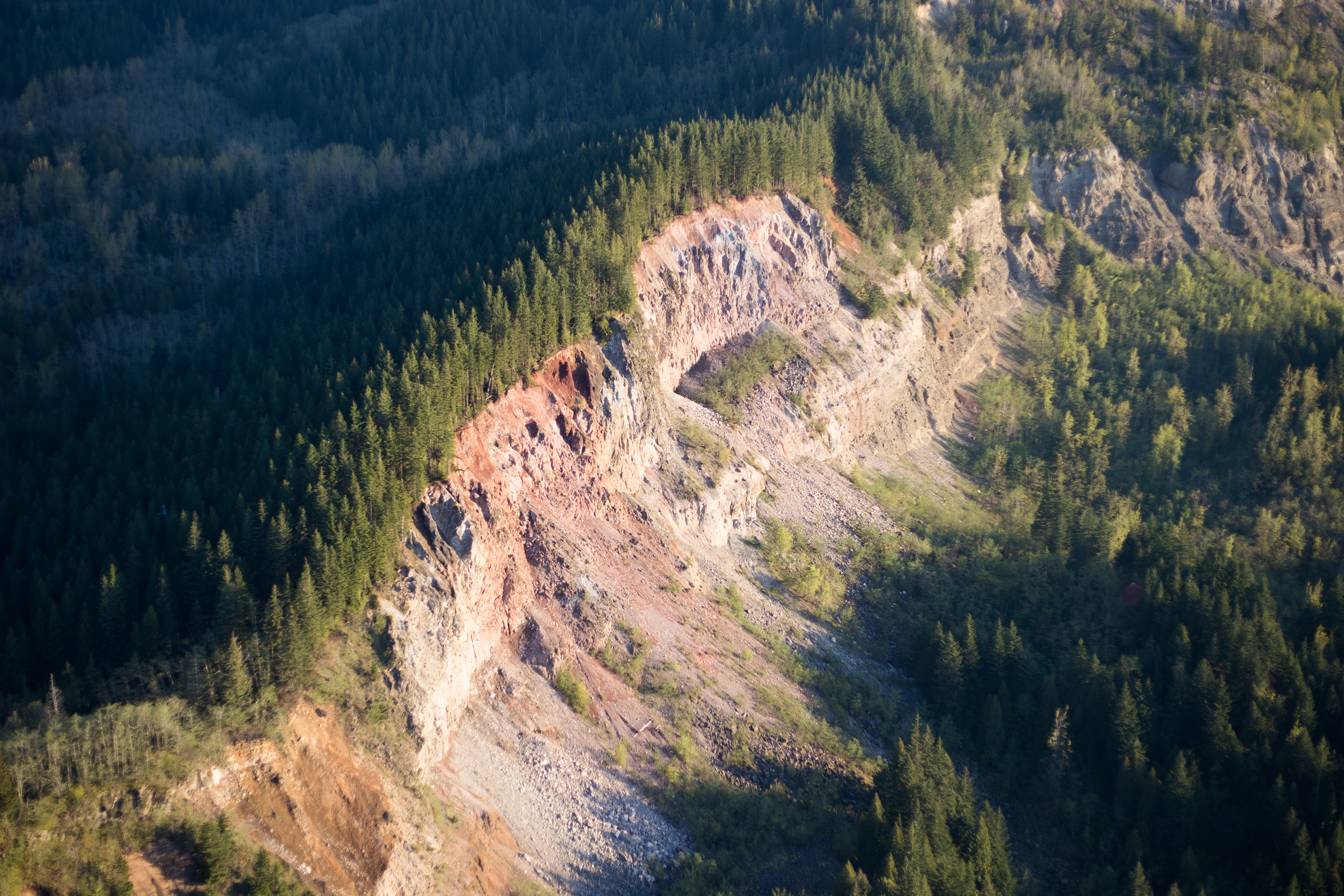
The Red Bluffs between Table Mountain and Greenleaf Peak.

The propensity of the area south of Greenleaf Peak and Table Mountain to collapse in landslides is due to the Eagle Creek formation. The rocks of the formation cover approximately 30 miles (48 km) of the Columbia River Gorge east of Cape Horn and consist of a mixture of past landslides, volcanic mud flows and ash falls. The formation is topped with basalt. Water can percolate through the basalt and saturate the Eagle Creek formation. In places where the formation is relatively close to the surface and inclined downslope, such as near Greenleaf Peak and Table Mountain, water saturation can cause the formation's material to slide away, carrying the overlying basalt with it.

Between Greenleaf Peak and Table Mountain, and above the Red Bluffs, lies Greenleaf Basin. The basin averages 2,040 feet (620 m) in elevation and is covered with forested wetlands. Greenleaf Creek flows south through the basin before plunging as a waterfall over the Red Bluffs escarpment.

In the winter of 2007-2008, there was a large landslide on the south slope of Greenleaf Peak, in the state-owned Table Mountain Natural Resources Conservation Area. Some 3 to 5 acres (12,000 to 20,000 m^{2}) of a timbered rocky cliff slid, burying approximately 30 acres (120,000 m^{2}) of forest under rubble. The slide was estimated to be about 750 feet (230 m) wide and 0.5 miles (0.80 km) long.
