= Table Mountain (Skamania County, Washington) =

Mountain in Washington (state), United States

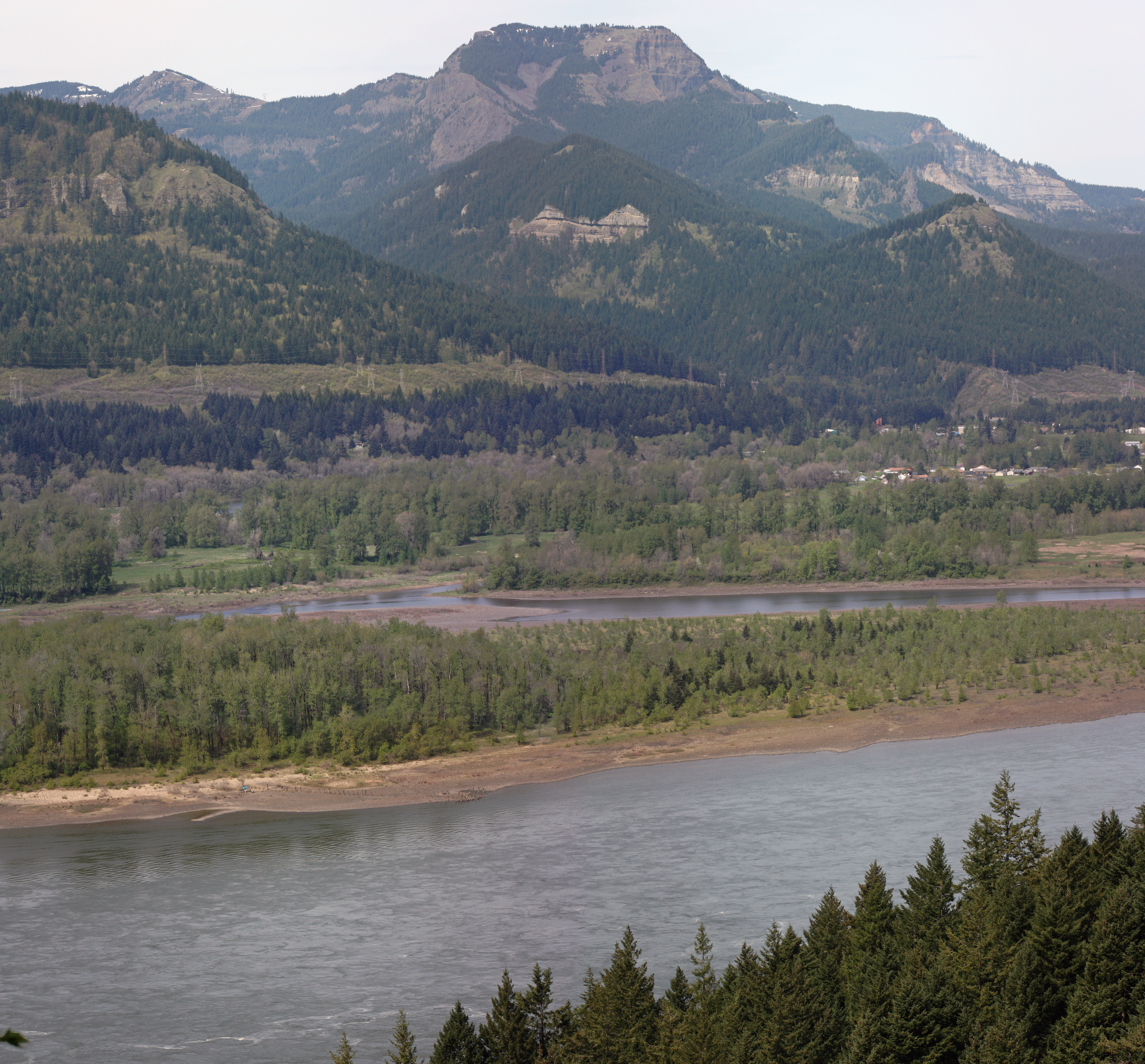
- South face of Table Mountain and Columbia River from John B. Yeon State Scenic Corridor

Highest point
- Elevation: 3,417 ft (1,042 m) NGVD 29
- Prominence: 377 ft (115 m)
- Coordinates: 45°41′26″N 121°59′01″W

Geography
- Location: Skamania County, Washington, U.S.
- Parent range: Cascade Range
- Topo map: USGS Bonneville Dam

Geology
- Mountain type: Basalt

Table Mountain is a peak rising on the north side of the Columbia River in Washington state, about 4 miles (6.4 km) north-northwest of Bonneville Dam. It is one of the most spectacular landmarks of the Columbia River Gorge. Its southeast face drops 2,400 feet (730 m) in less than one horizontal mile (1.6 km.), and is topped by an almost vertical 800-foot (240 m) cliff. Table Mountain is joined by the similar Greenleaf Peak to the northeast, and also by Hamilton Mountain to the southwest, which is lower, (2,438 ft or 743 m), but similarly steep and much closer to the Columbia. Together these peaks form an impressive group on the Washington side of the Gorge.

Between 1425 and 1450 AD the south side of Table Mountain sheared off and dammed the Columbia River in an event known as the Bonneville Slide.

The river soon carved a new bend around to the south, but for a while Native Americans living in the area could walk across. This led to the legend known as the Bridge of the Gods.
