= Cascade Locks, Oregon =

- City
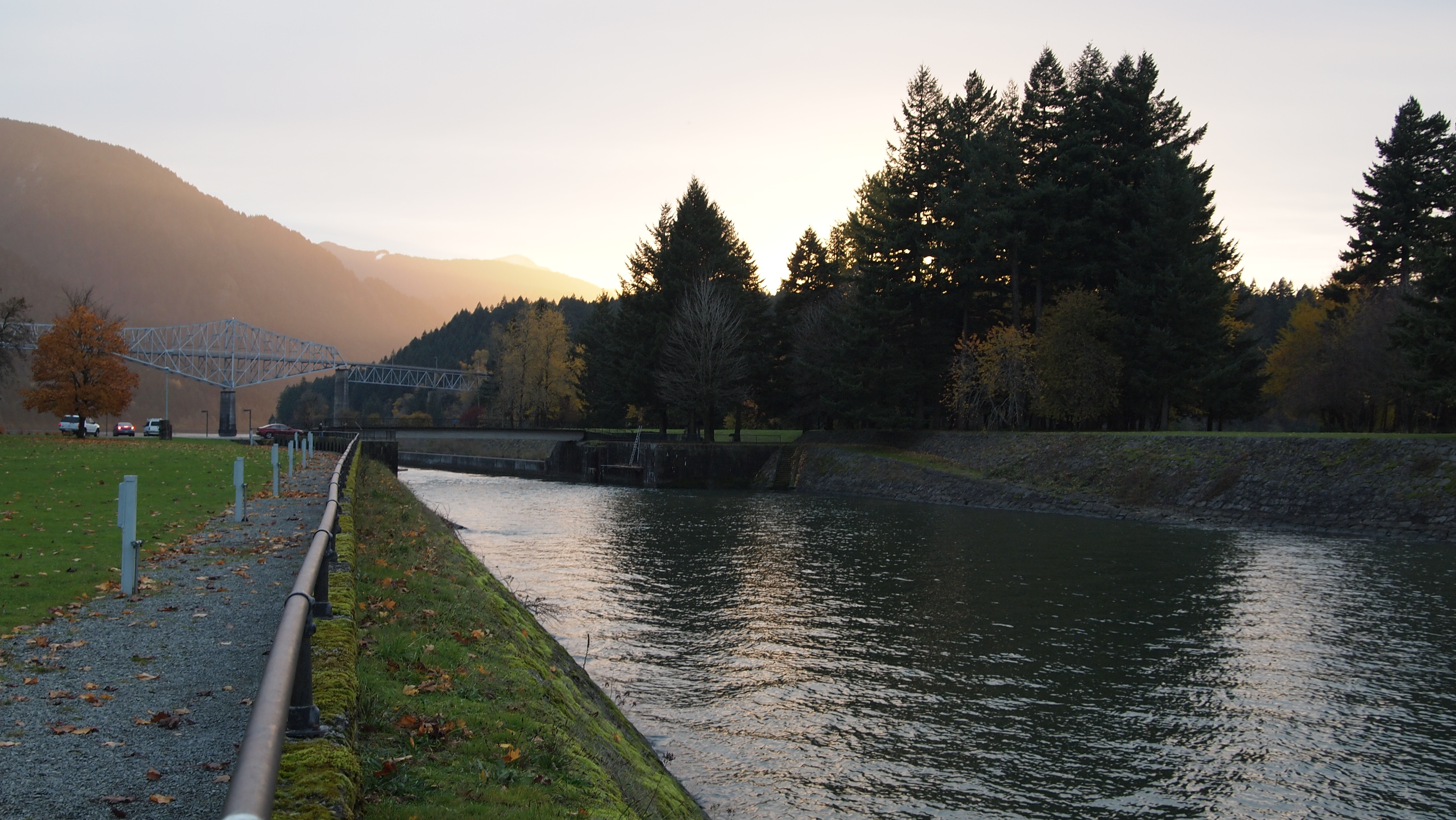
- Former locks on the Columbia River, with the modern Bridge of the Gods in the background

- Location in Oregon
- Coordinates: 45°40′21″N 121°52′25″W
- Country: United States
- State: Oregon
- County: Hood River
- Incorporated: 1935

Government
  - Mayor: Brenda Wood

Area
  - Total: 3.03 sq mi (7.85 km^{2})
  - Land: 2.08 sq mi (5.40 km^{2})
  - Water: 0.95 sq mi (2.46 km^{2})
- Elevation: 151 ft (46 m)

Population (2020)
  - Total: 1,379
  - Density: 661.5/sq mi (255.42/km^{2})
- Time zone: UTC-8 (Pacific)
  - Summer (DST): UTC-7 (Pacific)
- ZIP code: 97014
- Area codes: 541 and 458
- FIPS code: 41-11600
- GNIS feature ID: 2409403
- Website: cascade-locks.or.us

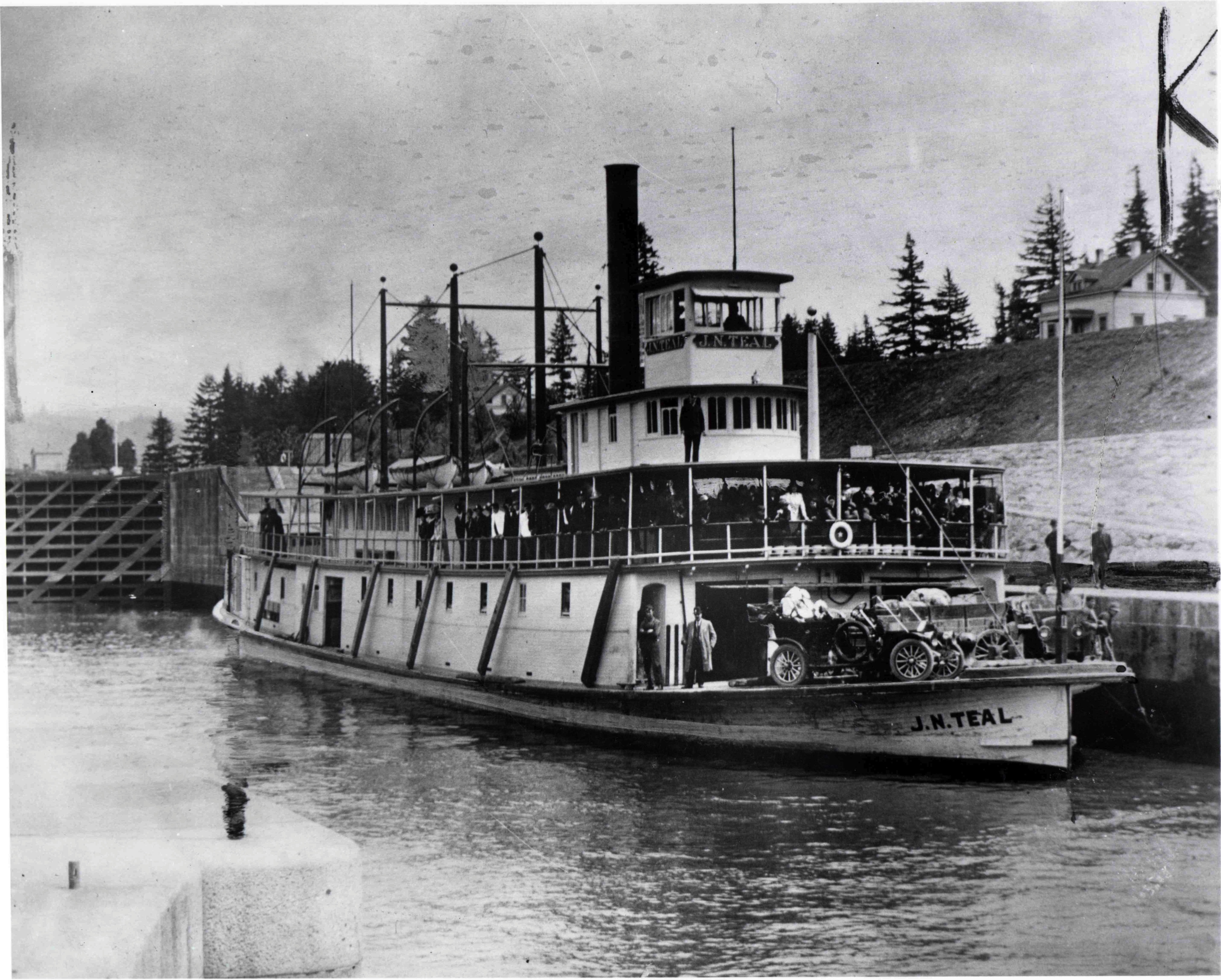
Sternwheeler J.N. Teal in Cascade Locks, 1911 Note the Brass Era cars on foredeck.

Cascade Locks is a city in Hood River County, Oregon, United States. As of the 2020 census, Cascade Locks had a population of 1,379.

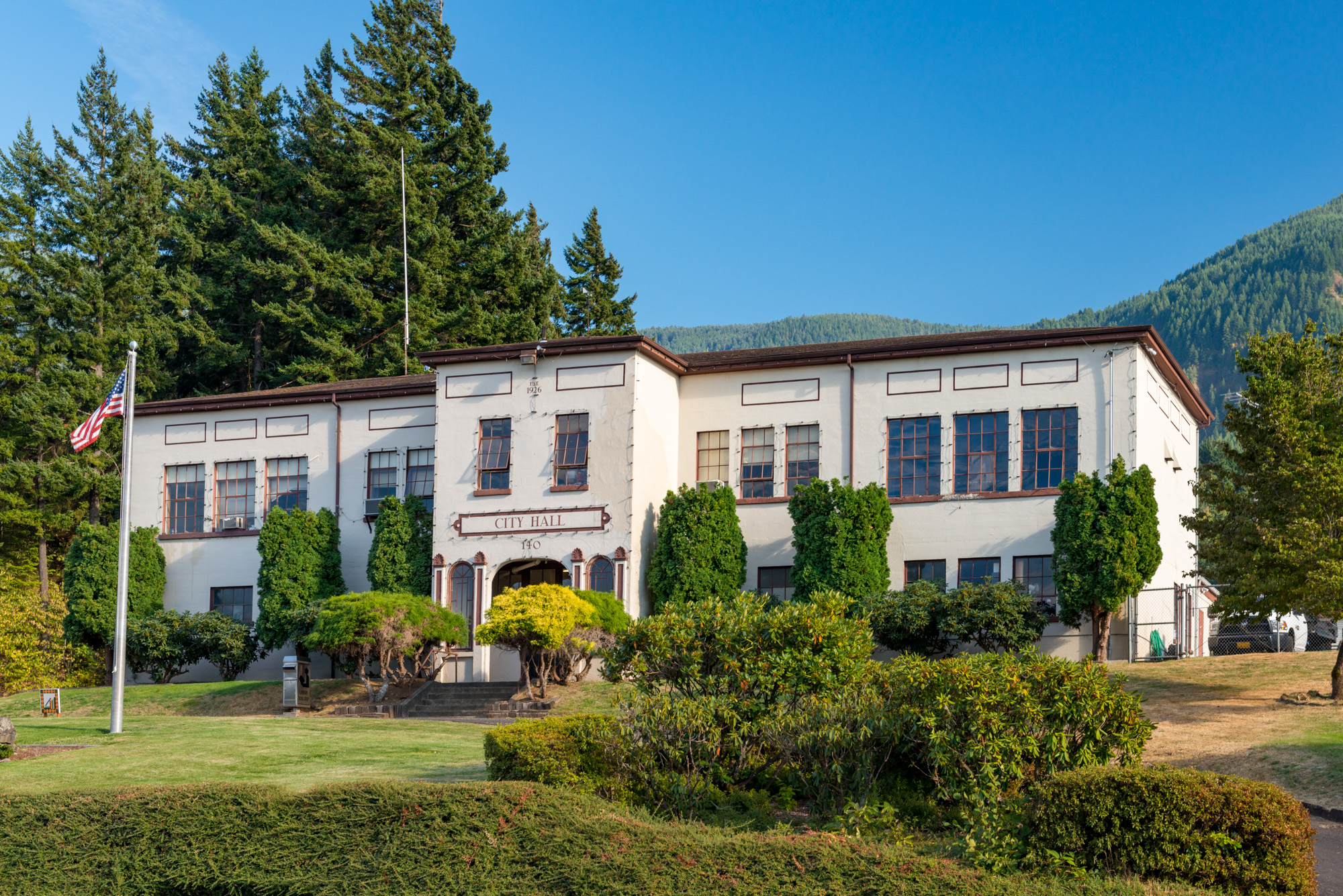
City hall

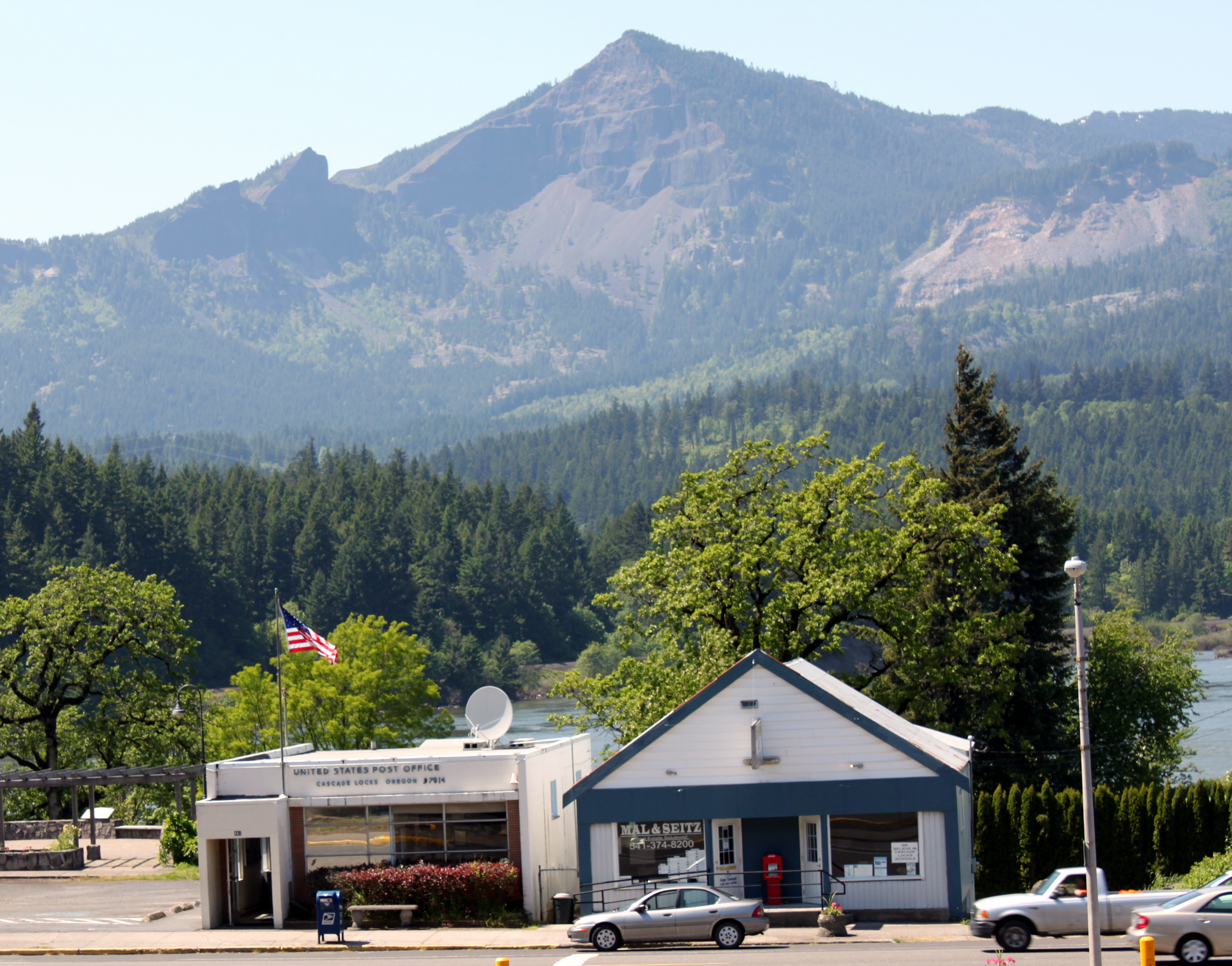
Post office in Cascade Locks, with the Columbia River in the background

Cascade Locks is just upstream from the Bridge of the Gods, a toll bridge that spans the Columbia River. It is the only bridge across the Columbia between Portland and Hood River. Cascade Locks is a few miles upstream of Eagle Creek Gorge, a popular scenic area that doubles as an alternate route for the Pacific Crest Trail. Cascade Locks is used frequently by hikers along the Pacific Crest Trail (PCT) to cross the Columbia River. Cascade Locks is the lowest point along the trail, which runs from the Mexico–US border in California to the Canada–US border in Washington, and the largest city directly on the trail.

Since 1999 the Confederated Tribes of Warm Springs have been pursuing an off-reservation casino to be sited in Cascade Locks. Starting in 2008, city officials began pursuing an arrangement that would allow them to trade city well water for state-owned spring water and to sell it to Nestlé for bottling. In May 2016, Hood River County voters voted over 68% in favor to stop the project permanently.

== Geography ==
Cascade Locks is in the northwest corner of Hood River County, on the south side of the Columbia River. It is bordered to the north (in the middle of the river) by Skamania County, Washington. The city of Stevenson, Washington, is north of Cascade Locks across the river.

U.S. Route 30 passes through the center of Cascade Locks as Wa Na Pa Street, joining Interstate 84 at the east and west end of the downtown. Both exits with I-84 are labeled "44". I-84 and US 30 lead east 19 miles (31 km) to Hood River and west 43 miles (69 km) to Portland. US 30 provides access to the Bridge of the Gods, a toll bridge which crosses the Columbia River to connect with Washington State Route 14 between North Bonneville and Stevenson.

According to the United States Census Bureau, the city of Cascade Locks has a total area of 3.04 square miles (7.87 km^{2}), of which 2.08 square miles (5.39 km^{2}) are land and 0.96 square miles (2.49 km^{2}) are water.

=== Climate ===
This region experiences warm and dry summers, with no average monthly temperatures above 71.6 °F (22.0 °C). According to the Köppen climate classification system, Cascade Locks has a warm-summer Mediterranean climate which is abbreviated as "Csb" on climate maps. The city receives an average of 76.27 in (1,937 mm) of precipitation per year.

Cascade Locks (1894-2014 Averages)

Climate chart (precipitation, max. and min. temperature)
J	F	M	A	M	J	J	A	S	O	N	D
12 40 31	9.2 46 34	8.4 54 37	5 63 42	3.6 68 47	2.3 74 52	0.7 80 56	1 80 56	3.2 73 51	6.2 63 46	12 50 39	13 43 34
- █ Average max. and min. temperatures in °F
- █ Precipitation totals in inches
Metric conversion
J	F	M	A	M	J	J	A	S	O	N	D
295 5 −1	234 8 1	212 12 3	127 17 5	91 20 8	57 23 11	17 27 13	25 27 13	80 23 11	158 17 8	310 10 4	331 6 1
- █ Average max. and min. temperatures in °C
- █ Precipitation totals in mm

== History ==
The city got its name from a set of locks built to improve navigation past the Cascades Rapids of the Columbia River. The U.S. federal government approved the plan for the locks in 1875, construction began in 1878, and the locks were completed on November 5, 1896. The locks were subsequently submerged in 1938, replaced by Bonneville Lock and Dam, although the city did not lose land from the expansion of Lake Bonneville behind the dam some 4 miles (6 km) downstream of the city.

== Demographics ==
Historical population
Census	Pop.	Note	%±
1940	703		—
1950	733		4.3%
1960	660		−10.0%
1970	574		−13.0%
1980	838		46.0%
1990	930		11.0%
2000	1,115		19.9%
2010	1,144		2.6%
2020	1,379		20.5%
U.S. Decennial Census

=== 2020 census ===
As of the 2020 census, Cascade Locks had a population of 1,379. The median age was 39.3 years, 22.0% of residents were under the age of 18, and 16.8% were 65 years of age or older. For every 100 females there were 104.3 males, and for every 100 females age 18 and over there were 100.9 males age 18 and over.

0% of residents lived in urban areas, while 100.0% lived in rural areas.

There were 545 households in Cascade Locks, of which 30.6% had children under the age of 18 living in them. Of all households, 44.4% were married-couple households, 22.9% were households with a male householder and no spouse or partner present, and 25.5% were households with a female householder and no spouse or partner present. About 25.7% of all households were made up of individuals and 11.0% had someone living alone who was 65 years of age or older.

There were 609 housing units, of which 10.5% were vacant. Among occupied housing units, 72.8% were owner-occupied and 27.2% were renter-occupied. The homeowner vacancy rate was 2.4% and the rental vacancy rate was 7.5%.

Racial composition as of the 2020 census
Race	Number	Percent
White	1,060	76.9%
Black or African American	6	0.4%
American Indian and Alaska Native	40	2.9%
Asian	21	1.5%
Native Hawaiian and Other Pacific Islander	5	0.4%
Some other race	69	5.0%
Two or more races	178	12.9%
Hispanic or Latino (of any race)	167	12.1%

=== 2010 census ===
As of the census of 2010, there were 1,144 people, 445 households, and 305 families residing in the city. The population density was 550.0 inhabitants per square mile (212.4/km^{2}). There were 502 housing units at an average density of 241.3 per square mile (93.2/km^{2}). The racial makeup of the city was 87.7% White, 0.5% African American, 1.8% Native American, 0.9% Asian, 0.6% Pacific Islander, 2.7% from other races, and 5.8% from two or more races. Hispanic or Latino of any race were 9.1% of the population.

There were 445 households, of which 30.3% had children under the age of 18 living with them, 47.2% were married couples living together, 13.7% had a female householder with no husband present, 7.6% had a male householder with no wife present, and 31.5% were non-families. 21.6% of all households were made up of individuals, and 7.4% had someone living alone who was 65 years of age or older. The average household size was 2.57 and the average family size was 2.95.

The median age in the city was 40.8 years. 20.8% of residents were under the age of 18; 10.3% were between the ages of 18 and 24; 24.4% were from 25 to 44; 32.9% were from 45 to 64; and 11.5% were 65 years of age or older. The gender makeup of the city was 51.5% male and 48.5% female.

== Transportation ==
- Cascade Locks State Airport

The Historic Columbia River Highway US 30 runs through the city, and can be accessed by exit 44 from I-84. The Bridge of the Gods connects Cascade Locks to Washington State Route 14.

Columbia Area Transit and Skamania County Transit provide local and intercity bus service to surrounding communities.

== See also ==
- List of cities in Oregon
- Cascade Locks and Canal, historical site after which the city is named
- Starvation Creek State Park
