= Bridge of the Gods (modern structure) =

Bridge between Oregon and Washington, U.S.

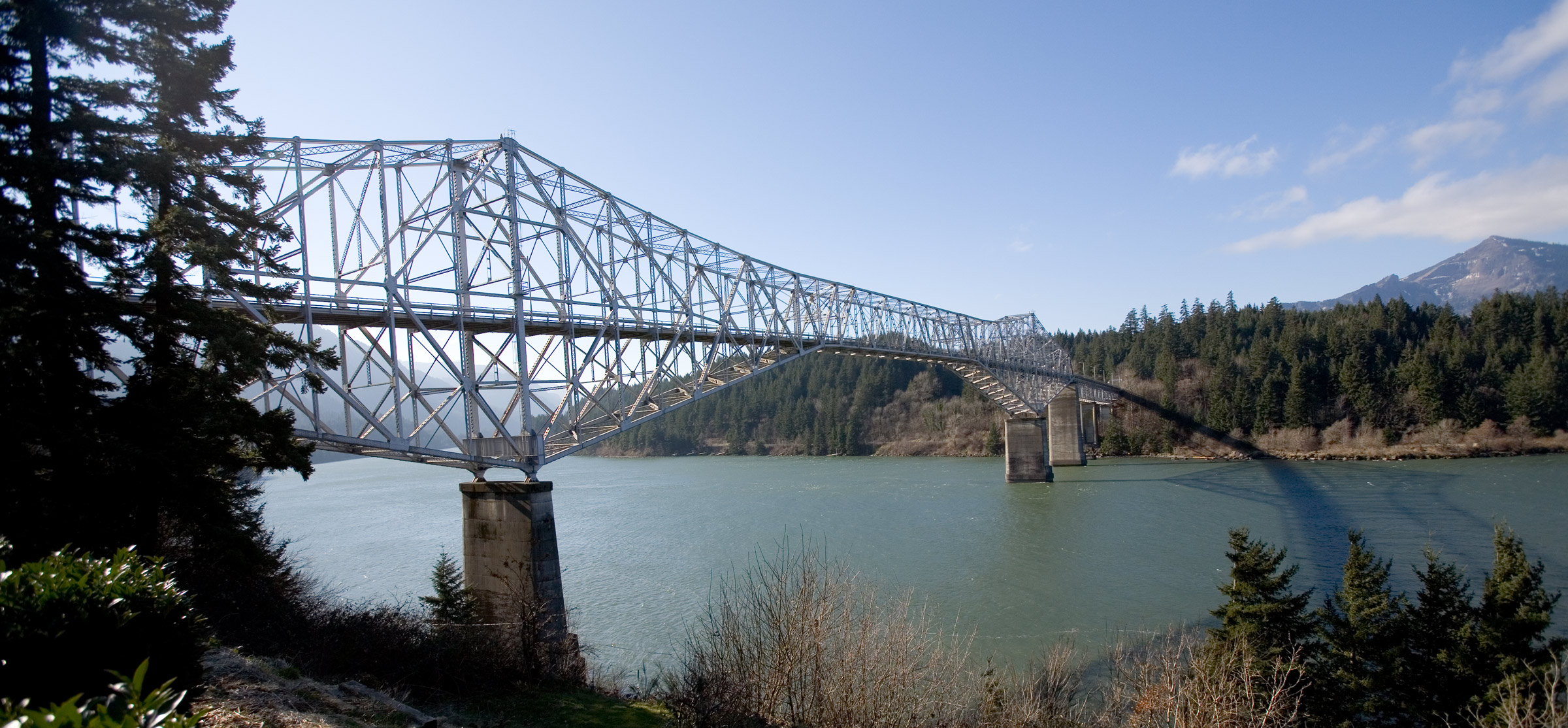
- Coordinates: 45.6623°N 121.9012°W
- Crosses: Columbia River
- Locale: Cascade Locks, Oregon / Skamania County, Washington
- Maintained by: Port of Cascade Locks

Characteristics
- Design: Cantilever through truss
- Total length: 1,856 ft (565 m)
- Longest span: 706 ft (215 m)
- Clearance below: 140 feet (43 m)

History
- Opened: 1926

Statistics
- Daily traffic: 3,732 (2014)
- Toll: Cars $3.00 (both directions)

Location
- Interactive map of Bridge of the Gods

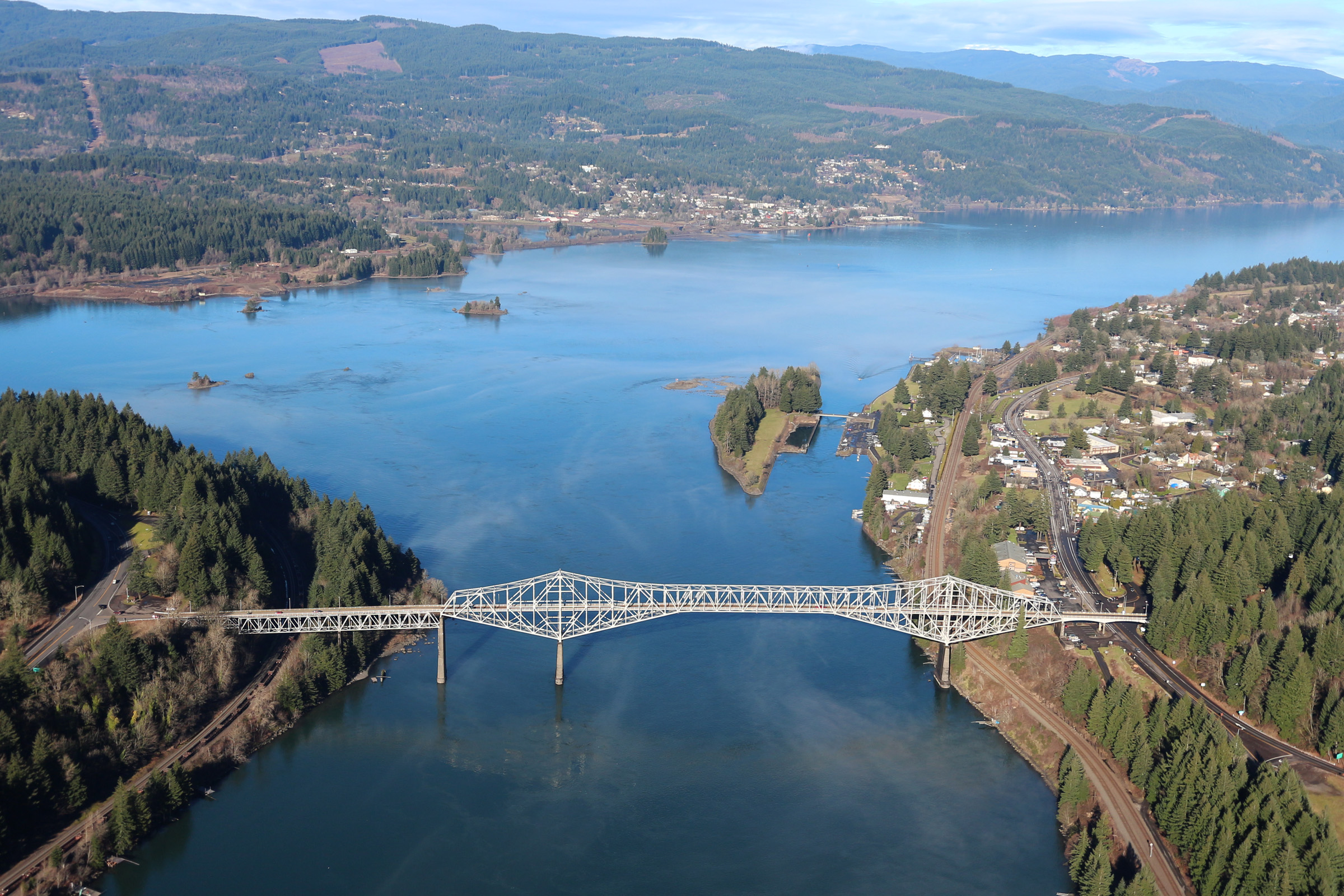
The Bridge of the Gods in 2015

The Bridge of the Gods is a steel truss cantilever bridge that spans the Columbia River between Cascade Locks, Oregon, and Washington state near Stevenson. It is approximately 40 miles (64 km) east of Portland, Oregon, and 4 miles (6.4 km) upriver from Bonneville Dam. It is a toll bridge operated by the Port of Cascade Locks, and it is named after the historic land bridge on the river.

The bridge was completed by the Wauna Toll Bridge Company and opened in 1926 at a length of 1,127 feet (344 m). The higher river levels resulting from the construction of the Bonneville Dam required the bridge to be further elevated by 44 feet (13 m) in 1938 and extended to its current length of 1,858 feet (566 m). The Columbia River Bridge Company of Spokane, Washington, acquired ownership of the bridge in 1953 for $735,000 (equivalent to $8.85 million today). In 1961, the bridge was purchased by the Port of Cascade Locks, which still owns and operates it.

The Pacific Crest Trail crosses the Columbia River on the Bridge of the Gods. The lowest elevation of the trail is about a mile north from the bridge at 110 feet (34 m). (Note: The bridge deck lies 180 feet above sea level, with the water below at 77 feet. South west of the bridge, the trail declines slightly in elevation. According to Halfmile's 2018 PCT track with Google Earth's elevation data, the lowest point is at 110 ft near Wauna Lake Road, about a mile past the bridge.)

Onlookers in September 1927 saw Charles Lindbergh fly the Spirit of St. Louis from Portland low over the new bridge and then, in a bit of barnstorming, make a 180 degree turn and fly back under the bridge, continuing to the Portland Airport, then on Swan Island.

For many years, the bridge toll was $1 per crossing; in 2016, it was raised to $2 due to the increased traffic after the release of the 2014 film Wild. The toll was increased to $3 in July 2022.

== See also ==
- List of crossings of the Columbia River
