= McSweeney-McNary Act of 1928 =

United States law

The McSweeney-McNary Act of 1928 is an article of American legislation that was enacted on May 22, 1928. The law created the directive to implement "…a comprehensive survey of the present and prospective requirements for timber and other forest products of the United States." The Act was sponsored by Senator Charles L. McNary from Oregon and Senator John McSweeney from Ohio.

The Act led to the creation of the first major survey of US forestry reserves and aimed to address four areas of forest management - to complete an inventory of timber reserves, an assessment of forest growth phases, a study of forest depletion and estimate requirements for forest products. The survey began in 1929 in the Douglas fir region of Oregon and Washington based out of the Pacific Northwest Forest and Range Experiment Station and was led by Thornton T. Munger, a research scientist for the U.S. Forest Service.

The McSweeney-McNary Act was repealed and replaced by the Forest and Rangeland Renewable Resources Research Act of 1978.
