= Stevenson-Carson School District =

School district in Washington, United States

Address
- 350 Northwest Bulldog Drive Stevenson, Washington, 98648; United States
- Coordinates: 45°41′58″N 121°53′11″W

District information
- Type: Public
- Grades: PreK–12
- NCES District ID: 5308520

Students and staff
- Students: 842 (2020–2021)
- Teachers: 45.34 (on an FTE basis)
- Staff: 15.64 (on an FTE basis)
- Student–teacher ratio: 18.57:1

Other information
- Website: www.scsd303.org

Stevenson High School

Location
- 390 Northwest Gropper Road; Stevenson, (Skamania County), Washington 98648; United States; 45.701°N 121.887°W

Information
- Type: Public high school
- Principal: Bill Schwan
- Staff: 14.00 (FTE)
- Enrollment: 270 (2023-24)
- Student to teacher ratio: 19.29
- Colors: Maroon, Columbia blue and white
- Nickname: Bulldogs
- Website: Stevenson High School

The Stevenson-Carson School District is located in Skamania County, Washington, with the district office in Stevenson, Washington It consists of:

- Carson Elementary School in Carson, Washington.
- Stevenson Elementary School in Stevenson, Washington.
- Wind River Middle School in Stevenson, Washington.
- Stevenson High School in Stevenson, Washington

As of 2021, there were 842 students in the district.
