= Mill A, Washington =

Unincorporated community in Washington, United States

- Unincorporated community
- Location within Washington (state)
- Coordinates: 45°45′13″N 121°38′56″W
- Country: United States
- State: Washington
- County: Skamania
- Elevation: 1,027 ft (313 m)
- Time zone: UTC-8 (Pacific (PST))
  - Summer (DST): UTC-7 (PDT)
- ZIP code: 98605
- Area code: 509
- GNIS feature ID: 1523144

Mill A is a small unincorporated community in Skamania County in the southwestern part of the U.S. state of Washington. It is near the southernmost edge of the Gifford Pinchot National Forest and lies between Willard to the north and Cook to the south.

== Parks and recreation ==
Mill A is located next to the Little White Salmon River, a popular local spot for white water kayaking. The Willard National Fish Hatchery is also situated on the river, just outside of the town. Other activities such as wind-surfing, skiing, snow boarding, camping, hunting, fishing, bicycling, golfing, and boating are also popular near Mill A and other communities. Nearby hiking locations include Dog Mountain, Indian Heaven, and Beacon Rock State Park. There is also nearby access to the Pacific Crest Trail.

== Education ==
Mill A is located in the Mill A School District, home to both the Mill A Elementary School and Pacific Crest Innovation Academy. This district contains about 491 residents.
