= Stabler, Washington =

Unincorporated community in Washington, United States

- Unincorporated community
- Location within Washington (state) Location within the United States
- Coordinates: 45°48′29″N 121°54′28″W
- Country: United States
- State: Washington
- County: Skamania
- Elevation: 951 ft (290 m)
- Time zone: UTC-8 (Pacific (PST))
  - Summer (DST): UTC-7 (PDT)
- GNIS feature ID: 1526471

Stabler is a small unincorporated community in Skamania County in the southwestern part of the U.S. state of Washington. Also known as "Hemlock", Stabler is located in the southernmost region of the Gifford Pinchot National Forest.

Stabler is primarily a bedroom community for commuters working in nearby Carson, Stevenson, and other towns in the Columbia River Gorge. The area is also home to the Wind River Experimental Forest, and the Wind River Ranger Station, a base of operations for the United States Forest Service.

== History ==
The twenty-six foot Hemlock Lake dam was built in 1935 by the Civilian Conservation Corps (CCC) to provide water for hydroelectric power generation, and was modified in 1958 to provide irrigation water to the Wind River Tree Nursery. The hydropower was terminated in the 1950s, and the diversion that used to supply the nursery is not currently in use. The Wind River Tree Nursery was closed in 1997 and the dam is no longer used to divert water. It was the first in the Columbia basin to incorporate the use of a fish ladder. The dam was torn out in the summer of 2009 amid much debate with the idea that the removal of Hemlock Dam and restoration of lower Trout Creek would contribute to this whole watershed approach to habitat restoration, and is the culmination of many years of planning.

== Parks and recreation ==
As the "Gateway to Mount St. Helens", Stabler is a year-round recreation area. Activities include hunting, fishing, hiking with access to the Pacific Crest Trail, camping and snowmobiling. Many forest products can be obtained, with permit, such as edible mushrooms, huckleberries and beargrass.
