= Columbia Gorge Museum =

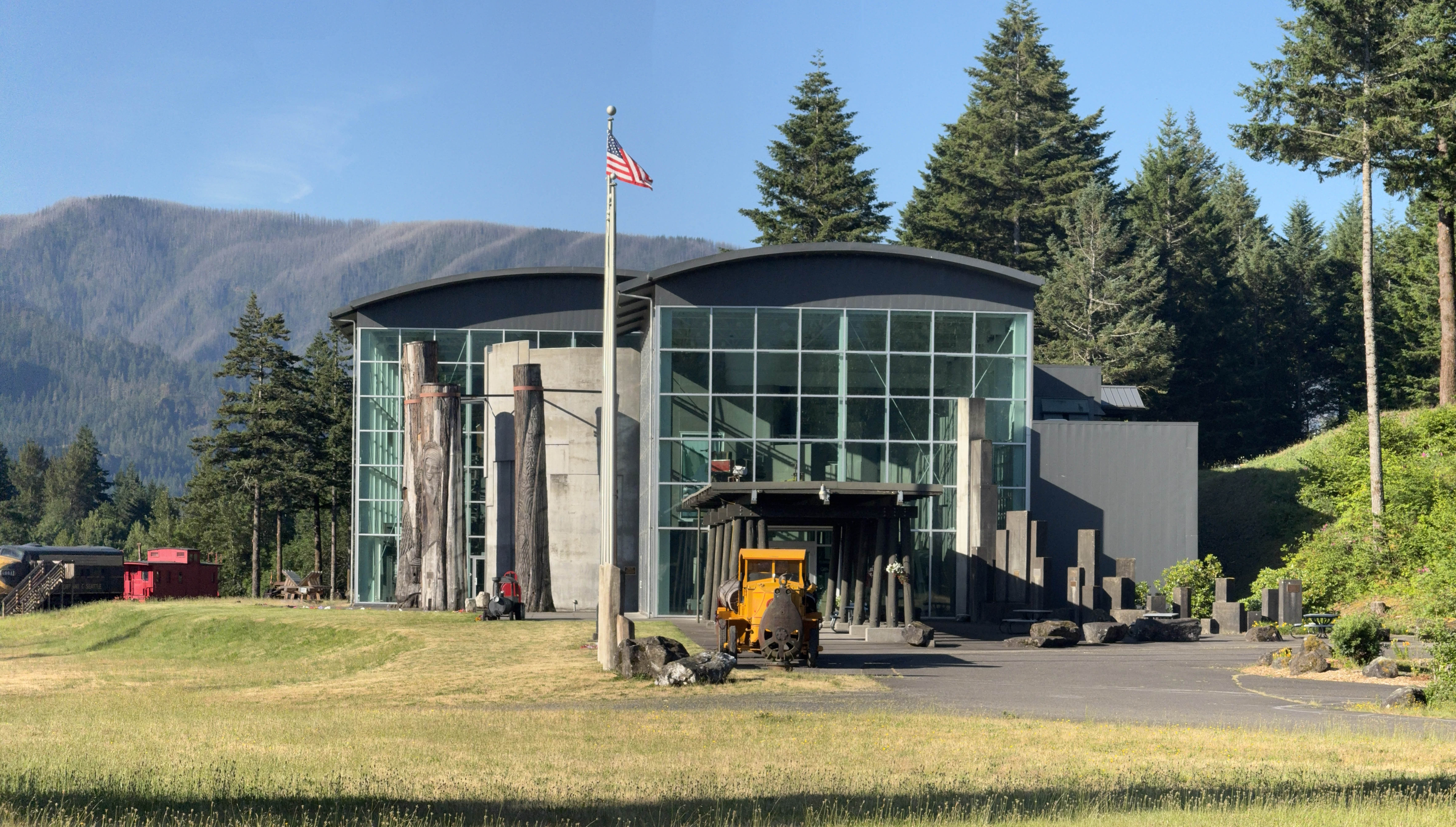
- Main entrance in Stevenson, Washington

- Location in Washington
- Established: 1995
- Location: 990 SW Rock Creek Drive; Stevenson, Washington
- Coordinates: 45.6879°N 121.8983°W
- Type: Regional history museum
- Owner: Skamania County Historical Society
- Website: www.columbiagorgemuseum.org

Columbia Gorge Museum (formerly the Columbia Gorge Interpretive Center Museum) is a regional history museum in Stevenson, Washington, that interprets the natural and cultural heritage of the Columbia River Gorge National Scenic Area. Operated by the Skamania County Historical Society, the 23,000‑square‑foot (2,100 m²) facility opened on May 17, 1995, replacing a smaller county museum and costing about $10.5 million.

== History ==
In 1973, Skamania County and the Skamania County Historical Society opened a small historical museum in Stevenson. It soon proved too small for a region attracting increasing numbers of visitors after Congress created the Columbia River Gorge National Scenic Area in 1986. In 1993 ground was broken on a larger museum designed by Portland architect Jean‑Jacques André to echo basalt cliffs and conifer forests surrounding the Gorge. The Columbia Gorge Interpretive Center Museum formally opened in May 1995 with 11,000 square feet of gallery space. Its name was formally changed to the Columbia Gorge Museum in 2023.

== Building and site ==
The museum stands on the north bank of the Columbia River, located near Skamania Lodge, downtown Stevenson and the Columbia River waterfront. The building's design incorporates stone and glass. Landscaped grounds include native plantings and Carver's "Cedar Trees," three 30‑foot (9.1 m) cedar sculptures by Chinookan artist Dudley Carver.

== Exhibits and collections ==
- Grand Gallery: Dominated by four large industrial artifacts: a 37‑foot (11 m) working replica of a 19th‑century McCord fish wheel, a 1921 Mack logging truck, an 1893 Corliss steam engine, and a 1917 Curtiss JN‑4 "Jenny" biplane.
- Harvesting Resources: Explores the timber and commercial fishing industries, featuring an indoor waterfall.
- Spiritual Quest Gallery: Houses the Don Brown Rosary Collection, billed as the world's largest assortment of rosaries, with more than 4,000 pieces.
- Natural History of the Gorge: Mezzanine‑level field tent exhibit on Gorge geology, botany, and entomology.
- Lewis and Clark & Early Settlement: Artifacts and dioramas covering Indigenous cultures, the Lewis and Clark Expedition, and 19th‑century fur trading.

Rotating art shows are hosted in a gallery that showcases regional artists and rotating exhibits.

== Programs and events ==
The museum offers guided tours, curriculum‑aligned school programs, and lectures on Gorge history. It participates in the annual "Columbia Gorge Museums Pass" program with partner institutions in Oregon and Washington.

== Governance and funding ==
Columbia Gorge Museum is a 501(c)(3) nonprofit owned and operated by the Skamania County Historical Society. Funding comes from admissions, memberships, county support, and private donations.

== See also ==
- Columbia Gorge Discovery Center & Museum
- History Museum of Hood River County
- Maryhill Museum of Art
