= Christian Aalvik =

American politician

Christian Aalvik was a member of the Washington House of Representatives who represented the 16th legislative district from 1937 to 1939.

== Biography ==
Born in or around the year 1876, Aalvik was of Danish descent and worked as a fuel dealer in Stevenson, Washington.

Aalvik ran for state representative in 1936 in the 16th legislative district, which included portions of Benton, Franklin, Klickitat, and Skamania counties. A Democrat, Aalvik was initially reported to have lost the general election to the Republican nominee but edged out a victory once absentee ballots were counted, winning by only 324 votes. During his term in office, Aalvik introduced a bill that he claimed would cut the lawful limit of game fish from 30 to 20 a day; however, the limit was already 20 at the time of the bill's introduction. He also introduced a bill that would have legalized some fish traps in Washington. Aalvik filed to run for reelection in 1938 but only received 4% of the vote in the primary.

Aalvik was a long-time member of the Independent Order of Odd Fellows and Fraternal Order of Eagles. He died on May 16, 1953.

== Electoral history ==
16th House District Position 1 Election, 1936
Primary election
Party	Candidate	Votes	%
Democratic	Fred D. Kemp	4,403	42.59
Republican	L.E. Johnson	2,003	19.38
Republican	Chauncey Price	1,560	15.09
Republican	Bessie F. Ratliff	1,384	13.39
Democratic	Christian Aalvik	987	9.55
General election
Democratic	Fred D. Kemp	7,643	34.76
Democratic	Christian Aalvik	5,161	23.47
Republican	Chauncey Price	4,837	22.00
Republican	L.E. Johnson	4,347	19.77
Total votes		21,988	100.0

16th House District Position 1 Election, 1938
Primary election
Party	Candidate	Votes	%
Republican	Mark M. Moulton	2,976	19.22
Republican	Geo F. Christensen	2,513	16.23
Democratic	D.W. Neff	1,961	12.66
Republican	Guy F. Wade	4,403	11.98
Democratic	Earl S. Coe	1,548	10.00
Democratic	Hilda Broughton	1,182	7.63
Democratic	D.M. Hurley	1,059	6.84
Democratic	Merle Hurd	1,038	6.70
Democratic	W.J. Ewing	726	4.69
Republican	Christian Aalvik	726	4.06
General election
Republican	Mark M. Moulton	5,423	25.45
Democratic	Earl S. Coe	5,397	25.33
Republican	Geo F. Christensen	5,244	24.61
Democratic	D.W. Neff	5,243	24.61
Total votes		21,307	100.0
