= Little White Salmon River =

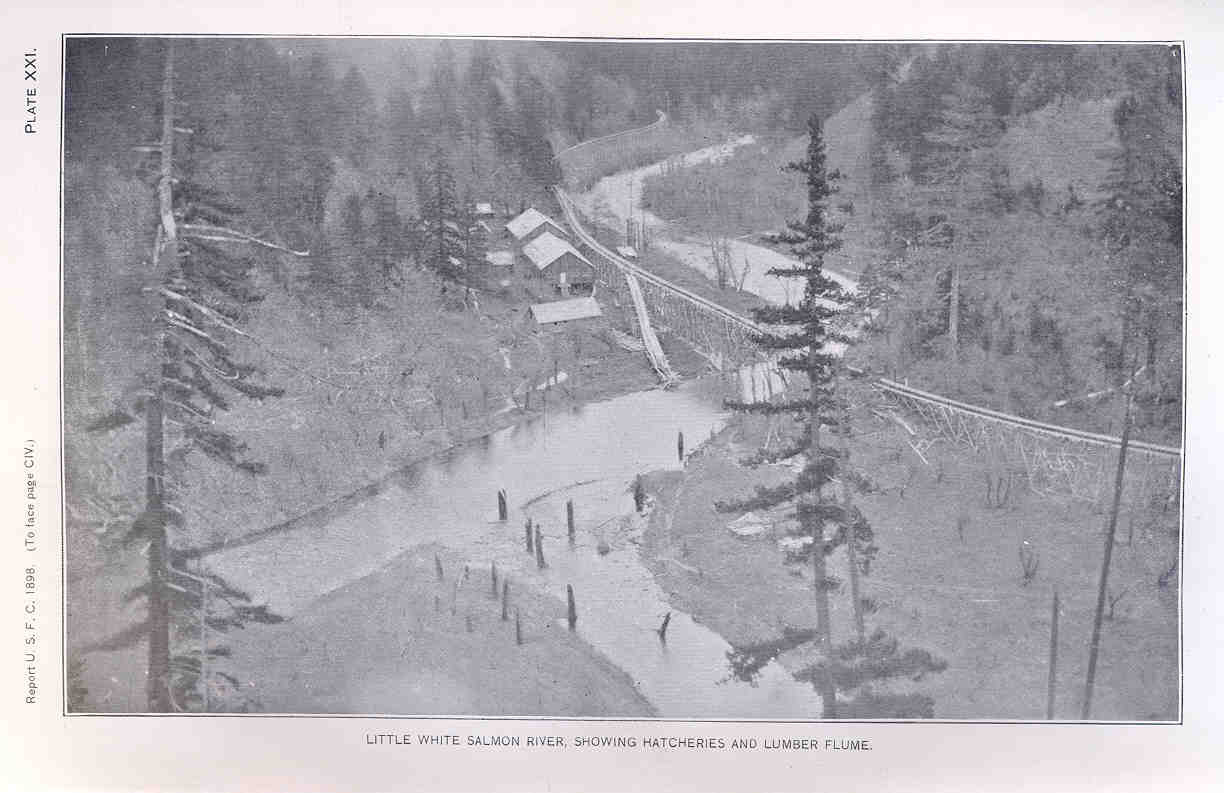
- Fish hatchery and log flume, 1898

- Location of the mouth of the Little White Salmon River in Washington Little White Salmon River (the United States)

Location
- Country: United States
- State: Washington
- County: Skamania, Klickitat

Physical characteristics
- Source: Monte Cristo Range of the Cascade Range
  - location: Gifford Pinchot National Forest, Klickitat County
  - coordinates: 45°55′07″N 121°35′52″W
  - elevation: 3,384 ft (1,031 m)
- Mouth: Columbia River
  - location: Drano Lake of the Bonneville Pool, Skamania County
  - coordinates: 45°43′14″N 121°38′25″W
  - elevation: 98 ft (30 m)
- Length: 19 mi (31 km)
- Basin size: 136 sq mi (350 km^{2})

The Little White Salmon River is a tributary, about 19 miles (31 km) long, of the Columbia River in the U.S. state of Washington. Its headwaters are in the Monte Cristo Range in Gifford Pinchot National Forest. The river flows from this part of the Cascade Range into Drano Lake, an arm of the Bonneville Pool of the Columbia. The river drains a basin of 136 square miles (350 km^{2}) The basin's population was an estimated 513 in 2000.

Whitewater kayaking experts sometimes run a 4-mile (6.4 km) stretch of rapids in a steep canyon between the Cook–Underwood Road bridge and Drano Lake. The run, dangerous throughout, is rated Class V (extremely difficult) on the International Scale of River Difficulty. Named rapids include Gettin' Busy, Boulder Sluice, Island, Sacriledge, Double Drop, Backender, S-Turn, Wishbone, Bowey's Hotel, The Gorge, Stovepipe, Spirit Falls, Chaos and Master Blaster. The river has been the scene of two kayaking deaths since this stretch was first run in the 1990s.

== Course ==
The Little White Salmon River begins in the Monte Cristo Range in western Klickitat County near its border with Skamania County. In its upper reaches, it flows generally south through the Gifford Pinchot National Forest before turning southwest, receiving Beetle Creek from the right and entering Skamania County. Downstream of the county border, it passes through Oklahoma Campground and under Oklahoma Road (Forest Road 18), which then runs along the right. In the next stretch, the river receives Homes Creek from the left and Lusk Creek from the right.

Turning more sharply south, the river receives Berry Creek from the right, then passes under Oklahoma Road again before Cabbage Creek enters from the right. The road now runs along the left bank of the river as it meanders along the base of Shingle Mountain, which is to the river's right. In this stretch, Wilson Creek enters from the left before the river reaches Big Cedars County Park. Below the park, the river passes under Oklahoma Road again before flowing by Moss Creek Campground, on the river's right along the road. Below camp, Moss Creek enters from the right.

Over the next stretch, the river reaches the community of Willard and leaves the national forest. Just below Willard, the river passes under Willard Road, and Pine Creek enters from the right. Slightly further downstream, the Little White Salmon passes the Willard National Fish Hatchery, on the right, flows under Cook–Underwood Road, enters the Columbia River Gorge National Scenic Area, and receives Lapham Creek from the left. In a narrow canyon paralleled by Cook–Underwood Road on both sides of the river for the next stretch, the stream receives Rock, Squaw, and Bunker creeks, all from the right. At the end of the canyon, the river passes through the Little White Salmon National Fish Hatchery and enters Drano Lake, 163 miles (262 km) from the Columbia's mouth on the Pacific Ocean.

== Campgrounds ==
The United States Forest Service operates the Oklahoma Campground along upper Little White Salmon River. Amenities include 22 campsites, vault toilets, and potable water. The Lower Monte Carlo Trailhead is across Oklahoma Road (Forest Road 18) from the campground.

Further downstream, Skamania County manages the Big Cedars Campground, with two sites for tents and another for a small motorized camper. Near the county park and on the opposite side of Oklahoma Road is Moss Creek Campground, run by the Forest Service. Amenities include potable water, vault toilets, and 17 campsites.

== See also ==
- List of Washington rivers
- Tributaries of the Columbia River
