= Charles L. McNary =

American politician (1874–1944)

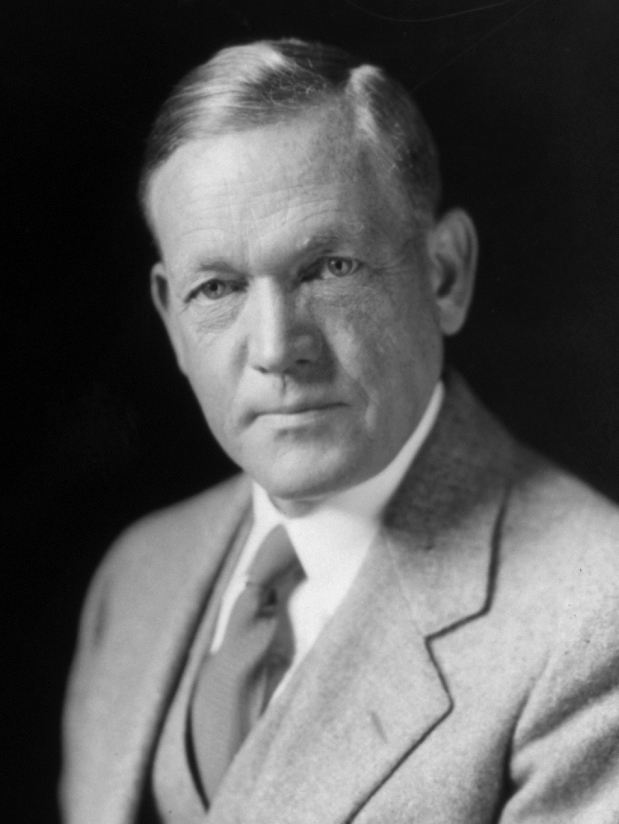
- McNary in 1931

United States Senator from Oregon
- In office December 18, 1918 – February 25, 1944
- Preceded by: Frederick W. Mulkey
- Succeeded by: Guy Cordon
- In office May 29, 1917 – November 5, 1918
- Appointed by: James Withycombe
- Preceded by: Harry Lane
- Succeeded by: Frederick W. Mulkey
Senate positions
Senate Minority Leader
In office March 4, 1933 – February 25, 1944
Deputy	Felix Hebert; Warren Austin
Preceded by	Joseph Taylor Robinson
Succeeded by	Wallace H. White
Leader of the Senate Republican Conference
In office March 4, 1933 – February 25, 1944
Deputy	Felix Hebert; Warren Austin
Preceded by	James E. Watson
Succeeded by	Wallace H. White
Chair of the Senate Republican Conference
In office March 4, 1933 – February 25, 1944
Deputy	Frederick Hale; Wallace H. White Jr.
Preceded by	James E. Watson
Succeeded by	Arthur Vandenberg
Chair of the Senate Agriculture and Forestry Committee
In office August 1926 – March 4, 1933
Preceded by	George W. Norris
Succeeded by	Ellison D. Smith

Justice of the Oregon Supreme Court
- In office 1913–1915
- Preceded by: new seat
- Succeeded by: Henry L. Benson

Personal details
- Born: Charles Linza McNary; June 12, 1874 Salem, Oregon, U.S.
- Died: February 25, 1944 (aged 69) Fort Lauderdale, Florida, U.S.
- Party: Republican
- Spouse(s): Jessie Breyman; Cornelia Morton
- Education: Stanford University

Charles Linza McNary (June 12, 1874 – February 25, 1944) was an American politician. A Republican, he served in the U.S. Senate from 1917 to 1944 and was Senate Minority Leader from 1933 to 1944. In the Senate, McNary helped to pass legislation that led to the construction of Bonneville Dam on the Columbia River, and worked on agricultural and forestry issues. He also supported many New Deal programs at the beginning of the Great Depression. He was Oregon's longest-serving senator until Mark Hatfield surpassed his mark in 1993.

McNary was the Republican candidate for Vice President of the United States in 1940, on the ticket with presidential candidate Wendell Willkie; both died in 1944, during what would have been their term had they won. They lost to the Democratic ticket, composed of Franklin D. Roosevelt, who was running for his third term as president, and Henry A. Wallace, by just under a ten-point margin.

McNary was a justice of the Oregon Supreme Court from 1913 to 1915. He had been dean of Willamette University College of Law, in his hometown of Salem, from 1908 to 1913. Before that, he was a deputy district attorney under his brother, John Hugh McNary. John McNary later was appointed as a federal judge for the District of Oregon.

McNary died in office after unsuccessful surgery on a brain tumor. Oregon held a state funeral for him, during which his body lay in state at the Oregon State Capitol in Salem. McNary Dam, McNary Field, McNary High School, and McNary Country Club (on land he owned) in Oregon are named in his honor. He continues to have the record as the longest-serving Senate Minority Leader.

== Early life ==
McNary was born on his maternal grandfather's family farm north of Salem on June 12, 1874. He was the ninth of ten children, and the third son, born to Hugh Linza McNary and Mary Margaret McNary (née Claggett). When the two married in 1860, Hugh McNary's father-in-law gave him a 112-acre (0.45 km^{2}) farm in what is now the city of Keizer.

McNary's father helped on the family farm, then taught school for a few years before returning to farming near Salem.

McNary was four years old when his mother died in 1878. His widowed father moved the family to Salem where he bought a general merchandise store; his declining health made him unable to run the family farm. Charles, known as Tot, began his education at a one-room school in Keizer and later attended Central School in Salem, living on North Commercial Street. Hugh McNary died in 1883, making Charles an orphan at the age of nine.

Nina McNary became the head of the household, while other siblings took jobs in order to provide for the family. As a boy, Charles worked as a paperboy, in an orchard, and at other farming tasks. He met Herbert Hoover, a future U.S. president, who moved to Salem in 1888.

He later worked in the county recorder's office for his brother John Hugh McNary, who had been elected as county recorder in 1890. For a short time he attended the Capital Business College. After leaving that school, he enrolled in college preparatory classes at Willamette University, with an eye toward attending Stanford University or the University of California. During this time, he met Jessie Breyman at a social club he helped start, and they began dating. Another member of the club was Oswald West, a future governor of Oregon.

=== Legal career ===
In the autumn of 1896, McNary moved to California to attend Stanford, where he studied law, economics, science, and history while working as a waiter to pay for his housing. He left Stanford and returned to Oregon in 1897 after his family asked him to come home. Back in Salem, McNary read law under the supervision of his brother John and Samuel L. Hayden, and passed the bar in 1898.

The brothers practiced law together in Salem as McNary & McNary, while John also served as deputy district attorney for Marion County. At this time, Charles bought the old family farm and returned it to the family. From 1909 to 1911 he served as president of the Salem Board of Trade, and in 1909 helped to organize the Salem Fruit Union, an agricultural association.

Jessie Breyman circa 1896

While still partnered with his brother, McNary began teaching property law at Willamette University College of Law in the spring of 1899 and courting Jessie Breyman. In 1908, he was hired as its dean to replace John W. Reynolds. As dean, he worked to enlarge the school and secure additional classroom space. He recruited prominent local attorneys to serve on the faculty and increased the size of the school from four graduates in 1908 to 36 in 1913, his last year as dean.

In his drive to make Willamette's law school one of the top programs on the West Coast, McNary had it relocated from leased space in office buildings to the university campus.

== State politics ==
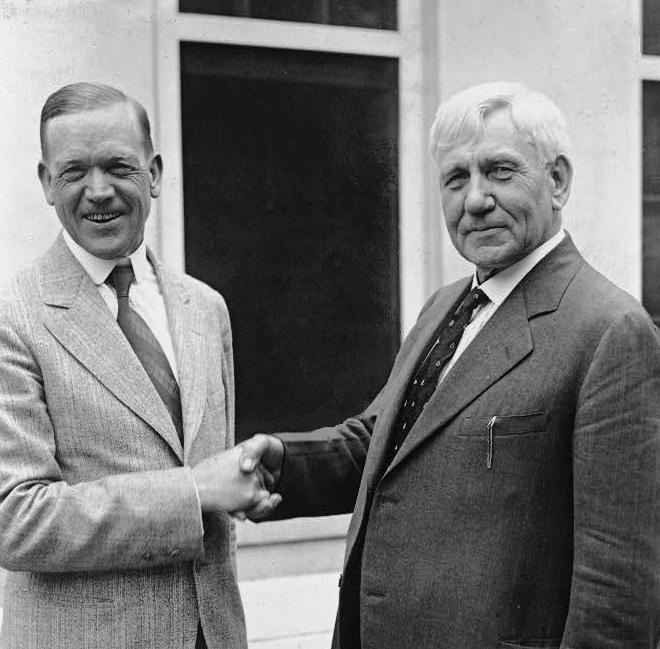
Senator McNary and Representative Gilbert N. Haugen, cosponsors of the McNary–Haugen Farm Relief Bill, shake hands at the White House in 1929.

McNary first held public office in 1892 when he became Marion County's deputy recorder, serving in the position until 1896. In 1904, he managed a successful campaign of his brother John for district attorney for the third judicial district of Oregon. John appointed Charles as his deputy, and the latter served until 1911.

Steve Neal, McNary's biographer, describes McNary as a progressive who stuck with the Republican Party in 1910, even when many progressives left the party in favor of West, a Democrat. McNary backed the Progressive Era reforms (the initiative, recall, referendum, primary elections, and the direct election of US senators) that were supported by Oregonian William Simon U'Ren. McNary was also an early supporter of public, rather than private, power companies.

After West won the election, he chose McNary to be special legal counsel to Oregon's railroad commission; he urged lower passenger and freight rates. Meanwhile, McNary maintained friendly relations with both progressive and conservative factions of the Oregon Republicans and with West.

In 1913, West appointed McNary to the Oregon Supreme Court to fill a new position, created by the legislature's expansion of the court from five justices to seven. At 39, he was the youngest of the justices, and McNary left law school and private practice behind. He quickly "established himself as a judicial activist and strong advocate of progressive reform". A supporter of organized labor, McNary "consistently defended the rights of injured workers and was not hesitant about using the bench as an instrument for social change", such as an eight-hour day for public employees. Unions supported McNary throughout his political career.

Several criminal convictions resulted from the Portland vice scandal in November 1912 which related to the city's epicenes. By the time McNary was seated, some convictions had been appealed to the court. He wrote the dissenting opinion in the reversal of the conviction of prominent Portland attorney Edward McAllister. The dissent was described as emotionally charged and "revealed a deeply seated personal discomfort with same-sex eroticism".

In 1914, the court moved into the new Oregon Supreme Court Building. McNary filed to run for a full six-year term on the bench. At that time the office was partisan, and McNary lost the Republican primary, by a single vote, to Henry L. Benson, after several recounts and the discovery of uncounted ballots.

After his defeat, McNary served the remainder of his partial term and left the court in 1915. On July 8, 1916, after a close, multi-ballot contest, with several contenders, the Republican State Committee elected McNary to be its chair. He was seen as someone who could unify the progressive and conservative wings of the party in Oregon.

== Federal politics ==
As chairman of the state's Republican Party, McNary campaigned to get the Republican presidential nominee, Charles Evans Hughes, elected in the 1916 presidential election. Hughes, a former US Supreme Court justice and future chief justice, carried Oregon but lost the presidency to the incumbent, Woodrow Wilson.

When Senator Harry Lane died in office, on May 23, 1917, McNary saw a chance to redeem himself after his failed bid for election to the Oregon Supreme Court. McNary was among several possible successors considered by Oregon Governor James Withycombe. The governor preferred someone who supported national women's suffrage and Prohibition, and he shared with McNary an interest in farming. Furthermore, McNary supporters argued that both progressive and conservative factions of the Republican Party would accept McNary and that unity would give the party the best chance of retaining the Senate seat in the next election. Withycombe appointed McNary to the unexpired term on May 29.

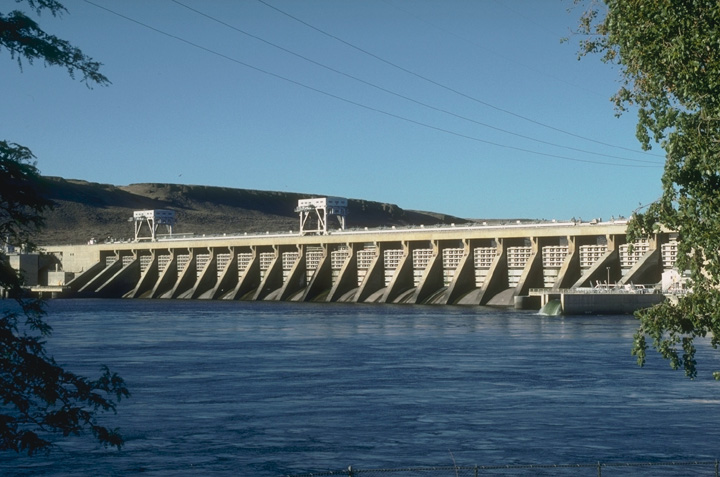
McNary Dam on the Columbia River.

After resigning as state party chairman, McNary prepared to campaign for a full term in the Senate. He faced Speaker of the Oregon House of Representatives Robert N. Stanfield in the May 1918 Republican primary. McNary defeated Stanfield 52,546 to 30,999. In the November general election, he defeated Oswald West, a friend and former governor, by 82,360 to 64,303, to win a full, six-year term in the Senate. Meanwhile, Frederick W. Mulkey won the election to replace McNary and finished Lane's original term, which would end in March 1919. Mulkey took office on November 6, 1918, replacing McNary in that seat.

Shortly after taking office, Mulkey resigned the seat effective December 17, 1918. McNary was reappointed to the Senate on December 12, 1918, and took office on December 18, instead of taking office in March, when the term he was elected to would have started.

Mulkey resigned to give McNary a slight seniority edge over other new senators who would join the 66th Congress. In 1920, former adversary Stanfield defeated incumbent Democrat George Earle Chamberlain for Oregon's other Senate seat, making McNary the state's senior senator. McNary won re-election to the Senate four times, in 1924, 1930, 1936, and 1942, serving in Washington, D.C., until his death.

=== Senate years ===
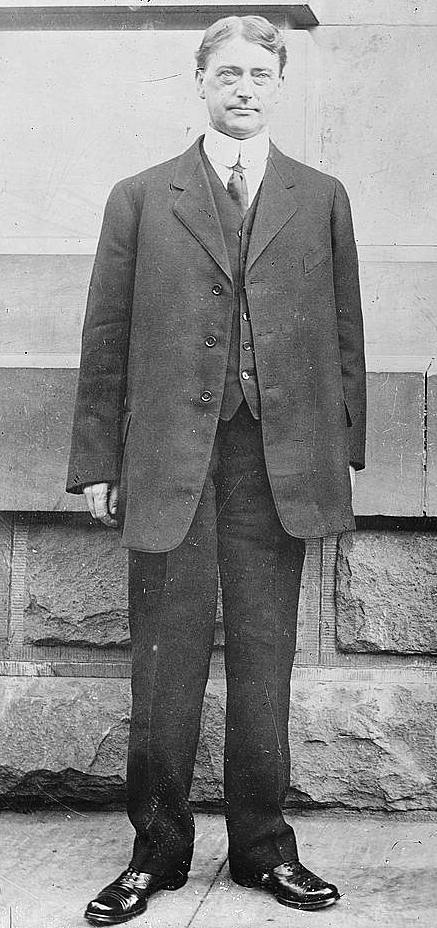
McNary as senator

After World War I, Wilson sought Senate approval of the Treaty of Versailles. Because the treaty included provisions for establishing and joining the League of Nations, one of Wilson's Fourteen Points, Republicans opposed it. Going against much of his party, McNary, part of a group of senators known as "reservationists", proposed minor changes to support the United States entry into the League. Ultimately, the Senate never ratified the Treaty of Versailles, and the United States never joined the League.

One of the prime opponents of Wilson and the League was Senate Majority Leader Henry Cabot Lodge. After McNary demonstrated his skill in the debate over the League, Lodge took him under his wing, and the two formed a longtime friendship. The friendship helped McNary secure favorable committee assignments and ushered him into the inner power circle of the Senate. Early in his career, he served as chairman of the Irrigation and Reclamation Committee, and as a member of the Agriculture and Forestry Committee. In 1922, President Warren G. Harding asked McNary to become Secretary of the Interior to replace Albert B. Fall because of Fall's involvement in the ongoing Teapot Dome scandal. McNary declined, preferring to stay in the Senate.

In 1933, McNary's fellow Republicans selected him as the Senate Minority Leader while the Senate was under Democratic control during the New Deal era. He remained Minority Leader for the rest of his time in office and "hovered most of the time on the periphery of the Republican left" and opposed disciplining Republican senators who supported Roosevelt. He supported many of the New Deal programs, at the beginning of Roosevelt's presidency. As World War II approached, he favored "all aid to England and France short of war". He voted to keep an arms embargo in place but supported the Lend-Lease agreement with the British in 1941 and the reinstatement of Selective Service in 1940, in preparation for military conscription of civilian men.

As early as the 1920s, McNary supported the development of federal hydroelectric power dams, and in 1933, he introduced legislation that led to the building of the Grand Coulee and Bonneville dams on the Columbia, as public works projects. He voted for the US joining the World Court in 1926. He favored buying more National Forest lands, forest management via the McSweeney-McNary Act, fire protection for forests via the Clarke–McNary Act, and farm support. Although President Calvin Coolidge vetoed it, the McNary–Haugen Farm Relief Bill was the forerunner of the farm legislation of the New Deal.

=== Vice presidential nomination ===
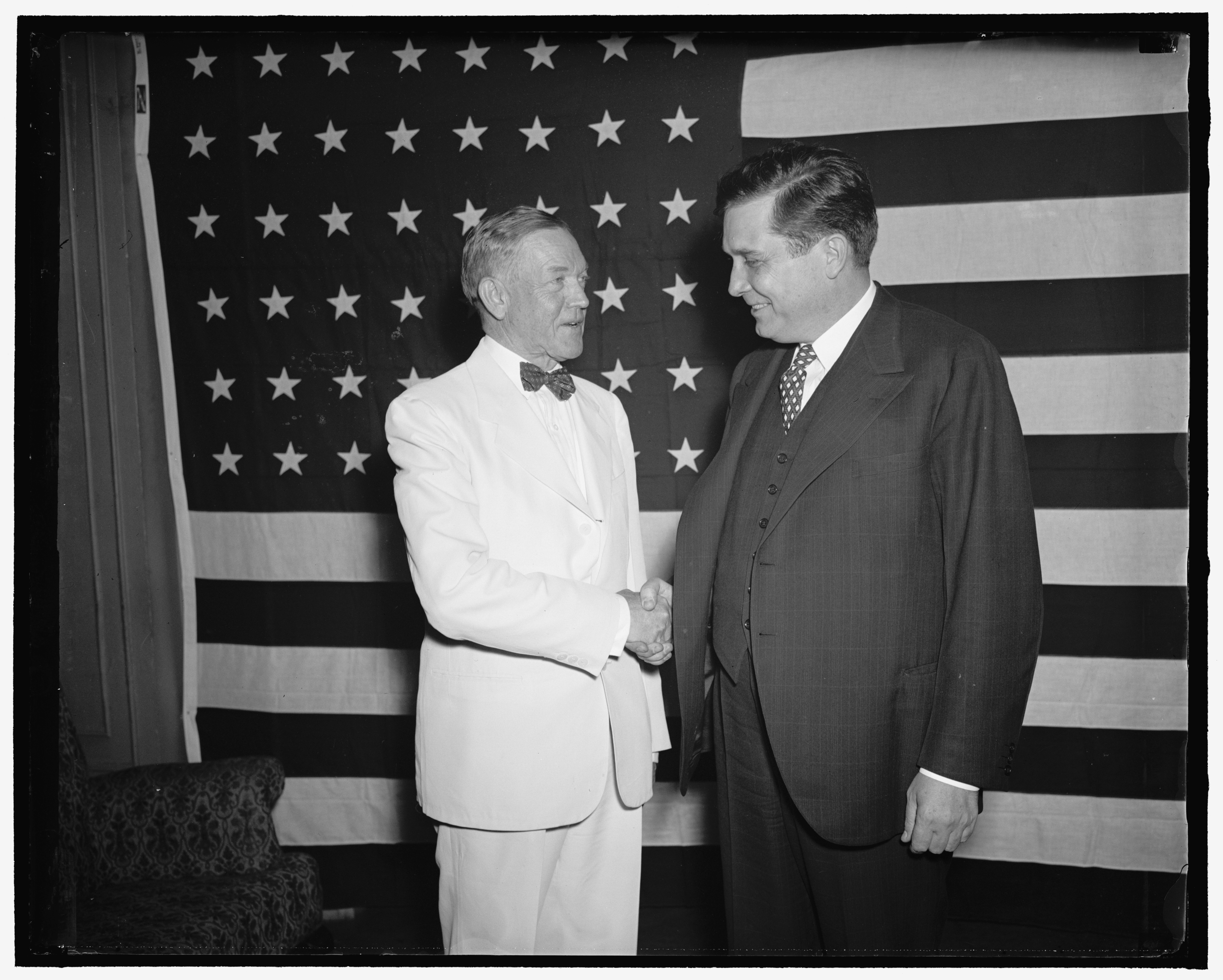
Charles McNary as Republican nominee for vice president, with his running mate Wendell Willkie, 1940

In 1940, McNary was the Republican nominee for vice president, as a western farm leader chosen to balance the ticket of presidential nominee Wendell Willkie, a pro-business leader from the east.

The two men differed on many issues. Writing for Life magazine shortly before the general election in 1940, Richard L. Neuberger said, "Whether as Vice President of the U.S. Charley McNary can keep on endorsing Government-power projects, isolation, high tariffs and huge outlays for farm relief under a President who believes in none of these things remains to be seen." McNary's acceptance speech reiterated his support for the Tennessee Valley Authority, a federally owned power-producing corporation that Willkie, as "the head of a far-flung [private] utilities empire", had opposed. During the campaign, McNary promoted farming issues and criticized foreign trade agreements, which, he said, had "closed European markets to our grain, meat, fruits and fiber".

== Personal life and death ==
On November 19, 1913, McNary married Jessie Breyman, the daughter of Salem businessman Eugene Breyman and his wife. Jessie died on July 3, 1918, in an automobile accident south of Newberg on her way home to Salem. She had been in Oregon to attend the funeral of her mother and was returning from Portland in the Boise family's car when it flipped and crushed her. McNary spent several days in Oregon for her funeral and then returned to Washington.

On December 29, 1923, McNary married for the second time, to Cornelia Woodburn Morton. He met Morton at a dinner party during World War I, in her hometown of Washington, D.C. Before the marriage, she had worked as his private secretary. As with his first marriage, his second did not produce children, but Charles and Cornelia adopted a daughter, Charlotte, in 1935.

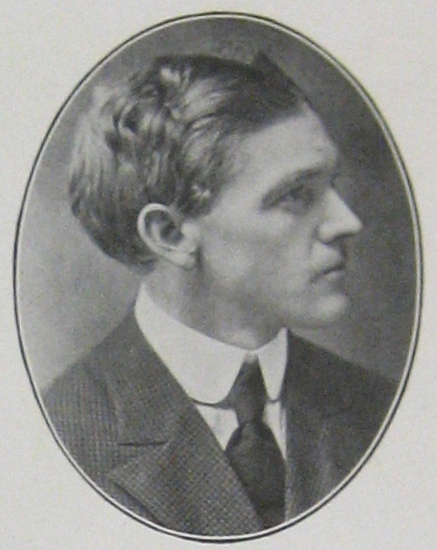
McNary in 1912.

In 1926, McNary built a new $6,000 ranch-style house, which he designed himself, along two creeks on his farm north of Salem. His estate, called "Fir Cone", featured a putting green, rose garden, tennis court, fishpond, and arboretum, and more than 250 acres (1.0 km^{2}) of trees. Later Senator Richard L. Neuberger would describe Fir Cone as Oregon's Monticello, as it hosted many meetings with politicians from the national stage. The farm included 110 acres (0.45 km^{2}) of nut and fruit orchards, through which McNary helped establish the filbert industry in Oregon and on which he developed the Imperial prune.

After complaining of headaches and suffering slurred speech beginning in early 1943, McNary went to the Bethesda, Maryland, Naval Hospital on November 8, 1943, where doctors diagnosed a malignant brain tumor. They removed it that week, and McNary was released from the hospital on December 2, but the cancer had already spread to other parts of his body. He and his family departed for Fort Lauderdale, Florida, to spend the winter. He partly recovered from the surgery, but by February 24, 1944, when he was re-elected as Republican Senate leader, he was comatose. McNary died the following day in Fort Lauderdale. He was given a state funeral, during which his body lay in state in the chamber of the Oregon House of Representatives at the Oregon State Capitol, Salem, and then was buried in Belcrest Memorial Cemetery in Salem. At the time of his death, McNary held the record for longest-serving senator from Oregon — 9,726 days in office. This mark held for nearly 50 years, until broken by Mark O. Hatfield in 1993.

== See also ==
- List of members of the United States Congress who died in office (1900–1949)

Academic offices
Preceded by John Reynolds	Dean of the Willamette University College of Law; 1908–1913	Succeeded by Isaac Homer Van Winkle
Legal offices
New seat	Justice of the Oregon Supreme Court; 1913–1915	Succeeded by Henry L. Benson
U.S. Senate
Preceded by Harry Lane	U.S. Senator (Class 2) from Oregon; 1917–1918; Served alongside: George E. Chamberlain	Succeeded by Frederick W. Mulkey
Preceded by Frederick W. Mulkey	U.S. Senator (Class 2) from Oregon; 1918–1944; Served alongside: George E. Chamberlain, Robert N. Stanfield, Frederick Steiwer, Alfred E. Reames, Alexander G. Barry, Rufus C. Holman	Succeeded by Guy Cordon
Preceded by James D. Phelan	Chair of the Arid Lands Committee; 1919–1926	Succeeded by John Thomas
Preceded by Charles Curtis	Senate Minority Leader; 1933–1940	Succeeded by Warren Austin; Acting
Preceded by Warren Austin; Acting	Senate Minority Leader; 1941–1944	Succeeded by Wallace H. White Jr.
Party political offices
Preceded by Frederick W. Mulkey	Republican nominee for U.S. Senator from Oregon (Class 2); 1918, 1924, 1930, 1936, 1942	Succeeded by Guy Cordon
Preceded by James E. Watson	Chair of the Senate Republican Conference; 1933–1944	Succeeded by Arthur Vandenberg
Preceded by Charles Curtis	Senate Republican Leader; 1933–1940	Succeeded by Warren Austin; Acting
Preceded by Frank Knox	Republican nominee for Vice President of the United States; 1940	Succeeded by John W. Bricker
Preceded by Warren Austin	Senate Republican Leader; 1941–1944	Succeeded by Wallace H. White Jr.
