= Willard, Washington =

Unincorporated community in Washington, United States

- Unincorporated community
- Location within Washington (state)
- Coordinates: 45°46′51″N 121°37′51″W
- Country: United States
- State: Washington
- County: Skamania
- Elevation: 1,253 ft (382 m)
- Time zone: UTC-8 (Pacific (PST))
  - Summer (DST): UTC-7 (PDT)
- ZIP code: 98605
- Area code: 509
- GNIS feature ID: 1528164

Willard is a small unincorporated community in Skamania County, in southwestern Washington.

Willard is situated along the Little White Salmon River, 5.0-mile (8.0 km) north of the Columbia River and Washington State Route 14, at the southern boundary of the Gifford Pinchot National Forest. The community of Mill A and the Willard National Fish Hatchery is also situated on the river, just outside of the town.
