= Carson, Washington =

Unincorporated community in Washington, United States

- CDP
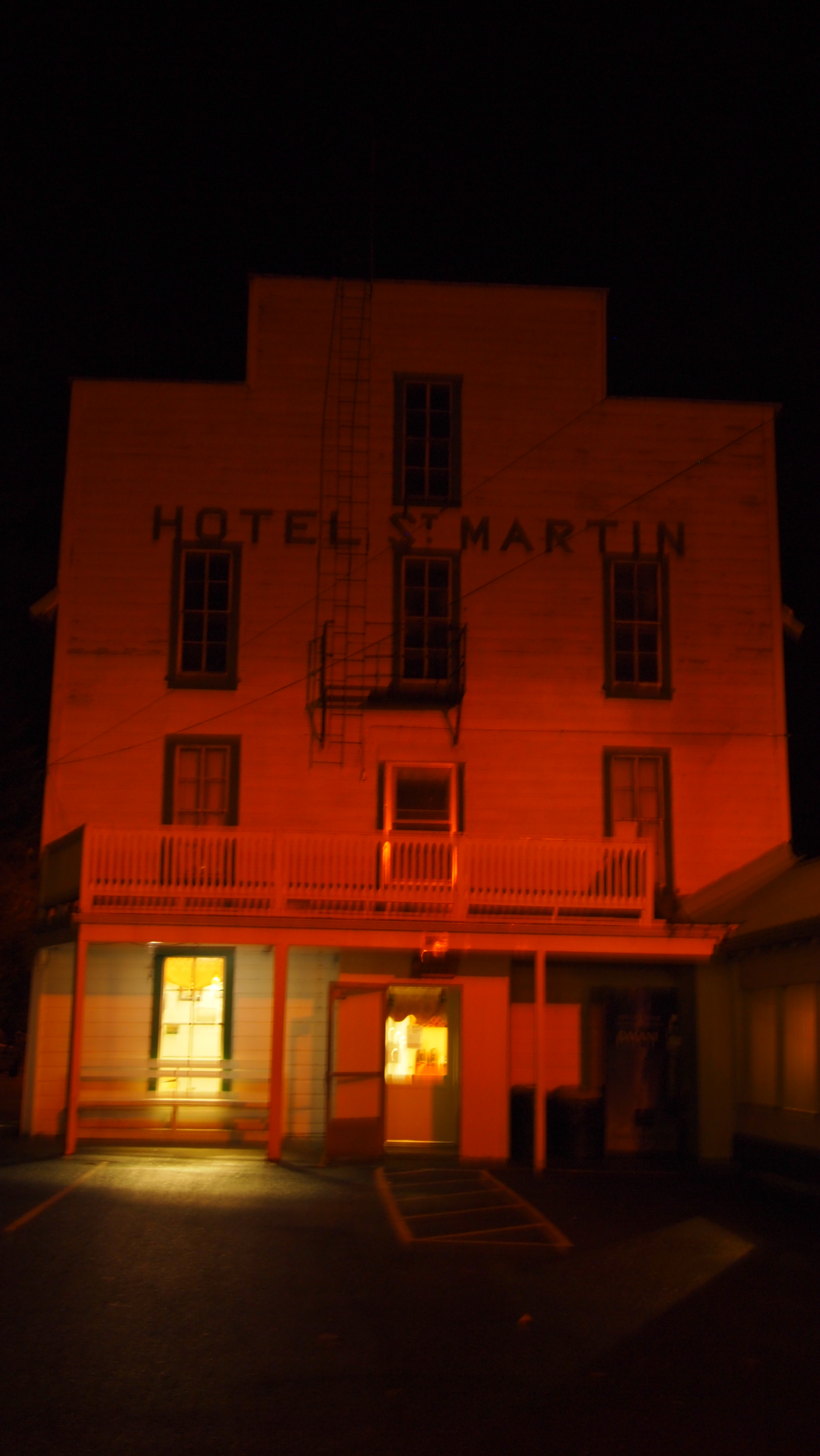
- Hotel St. Martin at Carson Hot Springs

- Location of Carson, Washington
- Coordinates: 45°44′47″N 121°49′28″W
- Country: United States
- State: Washington
- County: Skamania

Area
  - Total: 4.7 sq mi (12.2 km^{2})
  - Land: 4.7 sq mi (12.1 km^{2})
  - Water: 0.039 sq mi (0.1 km^{2})
- Elevation: 518 ft (158 m)

Population (2020)
  - Total: 2,323
  - Density: 497/sq mi (192/km^{2})
- Time zone: UTC-8 (Pacific (PST))
  - Summer (DST): UTC-7 (PDT)
- ZIP code: 98610
- Area code: 509
- GNIS feature ID: 2407972

Carson is a census-designated place in the Columbia River Gorge National Scenic Area, north of the Columbia River in Skamania County, in the southwestern part of Washington, United States. The population was 2,323 at the 2020 census.

Carson is located north of Washington State Route 14 and the town lies south of Stabler and between Stevenson to the west and Underwood and the neighboring cities of Bingen and White Salmon to the east.

== History ==
The post office in Carson has been in operation since 1894. The community takes its name from nearby Carson Creek.

== Geography ==
According to the United States Census Bureau, the CDP has a total area of 4.7 square miles (12.2 km^{2}), of which, 4.7 square miles (12.1 km^{2}) of it is land and 0.04 square miles (0.1 km^{2}) of it (0.43%) is water.

=== Climate ===
Climate data for Carson, Washington
Month	Jan	Feb	Mar	Apr	May	Jun	Jul	Aug	Sep	Oct	Nov	Dec	Year
Record high °F (°C)	45.6 (7.6)	54.3 (12.4)	62.8 (17.1)	70.4 (21.3)	78.9 (26.1)	85.8 (29.9)	93.5 (34.2)	93 (34)	84.1 (28.9)	71.7 (22.1)	54.7 (12.6)	44.2 (6.8)	93.5 (34.2)
Mean daily maximum °F (°C)	38.3 (3.5)	43.6 (6.4)	50.3 (10.2)	59.1 (15.1)	67.8 (19.9)	73.1 (22.8)	80.7 (27.1)	79.8 (26.6)	73.9 (23.3)	61.4 (16.3)	47.5 (8.6)	40.9 (4.9)	59.7 (15.4)
Daily mean °F (°C)	31 (−1)	35 (2)	40 (4)	46 (8)	53 (12)	58 (14)	64 (18)	63 (17)	58 (14)	49 (9)	39 (4)	35 (2)	48 (9)
Mean daily minimum °F (°C)	25.6 (−3.6)	27.9 (−2.3)	30.4 (−0.9)	33.5 (0.8)	39.1 (3.9)	47.4 (8.6)	47.4 (8.6)	46.7 (8.2)	42.5 (5.8)	37.5 (3.1)	31.9 (−0.1)	29.5 (−1.4)	36.4 (2.4)
Record low °F (°C)	2.9 (−16.2)	15.5 (−9.2)	22.8 (−5.1)	25.8 (−3.4)	33.8 (1.0)	39.7 (4.3)	46.2 (7.9)	45.2 (7.3)	34.5 (1.4)	28.4 (−2.0)	10 (−12)	7.6 (−13.6)	2.9 (−16.2)
Average precipitation inches (mm)	16.9 (430)	12.6 (320)	11.5 (290)	6.1 (150)	3.6 (91)	2.4 (61)	0.7 (18)	1.3 (33)	3 (76)	8.4 (210)	15 (380)	18.4 (470)	99.7 (2,530)
Average snowfall inches (cm)	38.1 (97)	17.8 (45)	7.3 (19)	0.7 (1.8)	0.0 (0.0)	0.0 (0.0)	0.0 (0.0)	0 (0)	0.0 (0.0)	0.0 (0.0)	3.4 (8.6)	17.6 (45)	84.9 (216)
Average precipitation days (≥ 0.01 in.)	18	15	16	12	10	8	4	4	7	13	16	19	142
Source: weatherbase.com

== Demographics ==
Historical population
Census	Pop.	Note	%±
1990	1,678		—
2000	2,116		26.1%
2010	2,279		7.7%
2020	2,323		1.9%
U.S. Decennial Census; 1970 1980 1990; 2000 2010

Carson first appeared as a census designated place under the name Carson River Valley in the 1990 U.S. census; the name was change to Carson prior to the 2010 U.S. census.

=== Racial and ethnic composition ===
Carson CDP, Washington – Racial and ethnic composition Note: the US Census treats Hispanic/Latino as an ethnic category. This table excludes Latinos from the racial categories and assigns them to a separate category. Hispanics/Latinos may be of any race.
Race / Ethnicity (NH = Non-Hispanic)	Pop 2000	Pop 2010	Pop 2020	% 2000	% 2010	% 2020
White alone (NH)	1,832	1,957	1,870	86.58%	85.87%	80.50%
Black or African American alone (NH)	7	10	2	0.33%	0.44%	0.09%
Native American or Alaska Native alone (NH)	68	38	35	3.21%	1.67%	1.51%
Asian alone (NH)	5	12	6	0.24%	0.53%	0.26%
Native Hawaiian or Pacific Islander alone (NH)	1	1	0	0.05%	0.04%	0.00%
Other race alone (NH)	19	1	9	0.90%	0.04%	0.39%
Mixed race or Multiracial (NH)	55	100	181	2.60%	4.39%	7.79%
Hispanic or Latino (any race)	129	160	220	6.10%	7.02%	9.47%
Total	2,116	2,279	2,323	100.00%	100.00%	100.00%

=== 2020 census ===
As of the 2020 United States census, there were 2,323 people residing in the CDP. The population density was approximately 484.0 inhabitants per square mile (186.9/km^{2}), based on a land area of 4.8 square miles. The racial makeup of the CDP was 88.5% White, 0.3% African American, 3.5% Native American, 0.2% Asian, 0.6% Pacific Islander, 3.6% from other races, and 3.2% from two or more races. Hispanic or Latino of any race were 220 persons (9.5%) of the population.

According to the 2023–2024 American Community Survey 5-year estimates, there were 1,082 households and 1,195 housing units. The median age was 53.5 years, and 26.6% of residents were 65 years of age or older. The median household income was $68,929, and 8.5% of the population lived below the poverty line. The homeownership rate was 73.5%, and the median gross rent was $910.

== Parks and recreation ==
Carson is situated within the Columbia River Gorge National Scenic Area and outside the southern end of Gifford Pinchot National Forest, which contains the nearby highland terrain areas of Wind Mountain and Dog Mountain.

The oldest arboretum in the Pacific Northwest, the Wind River Arboretum, is located in nearby Stabler. Carson has a local hot spring, and hotel and resort businesses in the town provide geothermal steam baths.

== See also ==
- List of census-designated places in Washington
