= Skamania Lodge =

Coordinates: 45.686°N 121.905°W

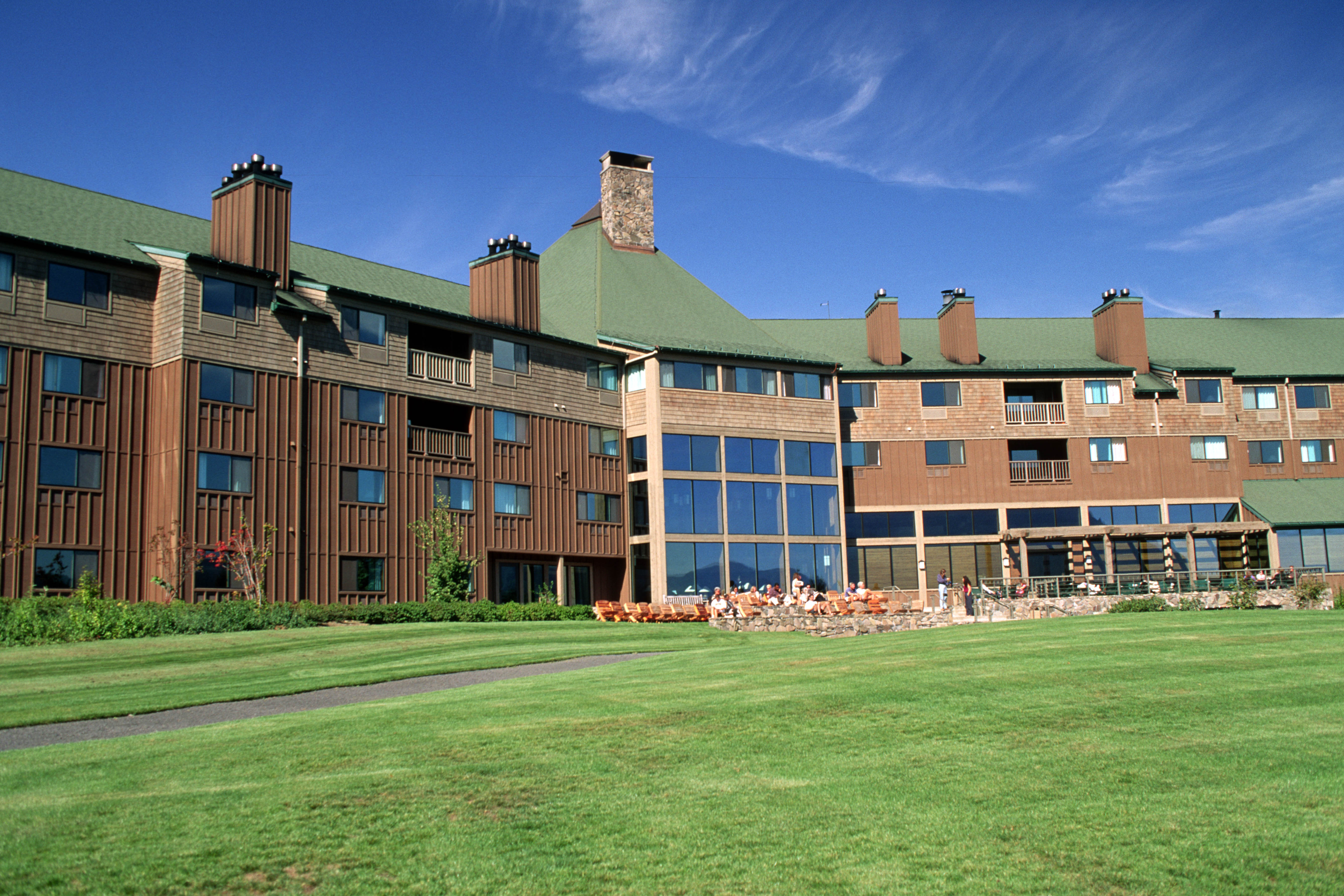
Skamania Lodge

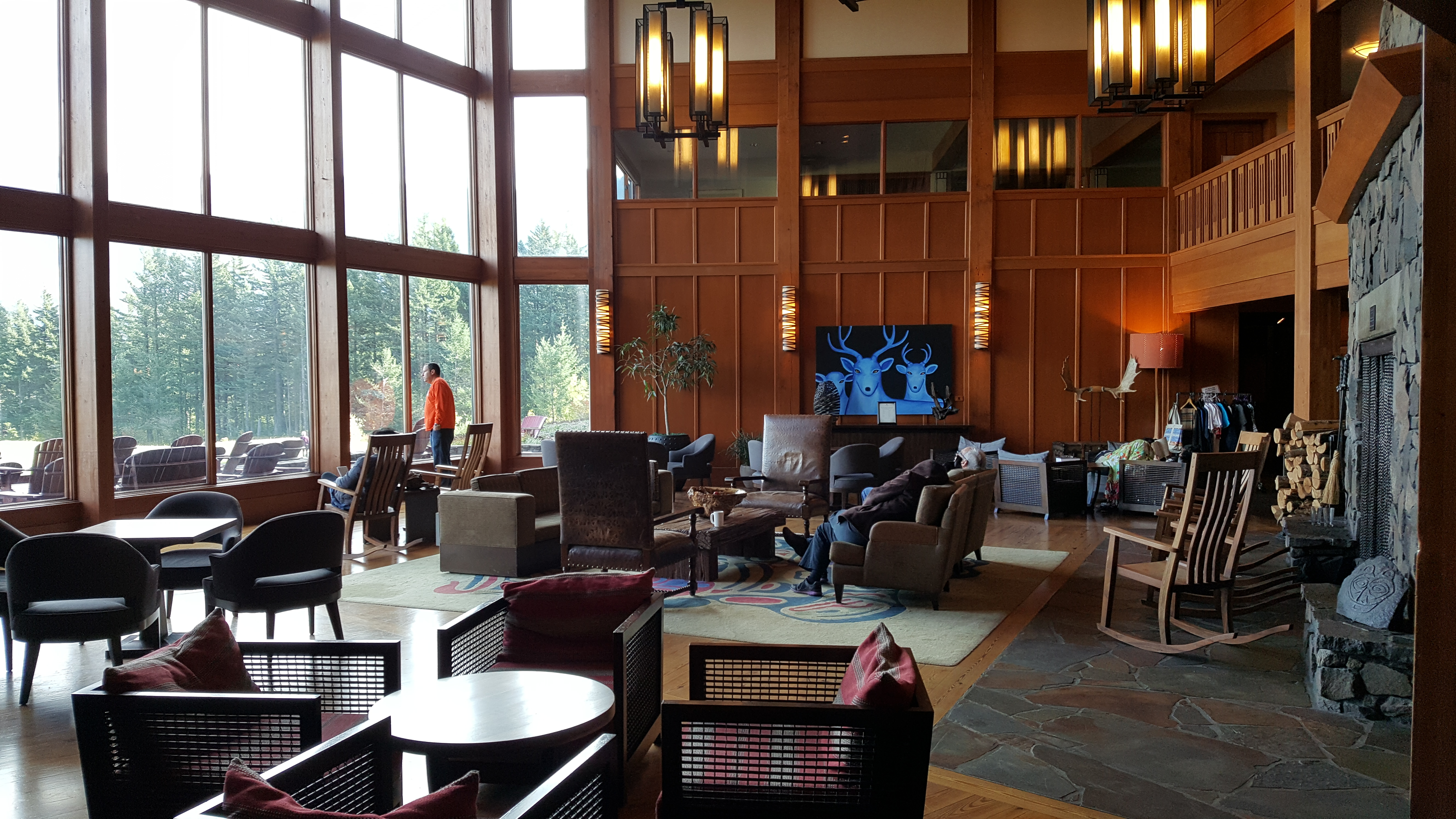
Interior view, 2017

Skamania Lodge is a resort near Stevenson, Washington, in the Columbia River Gorge, United States. The resort is on 175 acres (71 ha) of wooded land. Its lobby houses the Skamania Lodge Information Center, which serves as a visitor center for the United States Forest Service.

The resort underwent renovations in 2016, and opened luxury tree houses in 2017. Skamania also has an adventure park with zip-lining.
