= Thornton T. Munger =

Thornton T. Munger (1883–1975) was a pioneering research scientist for the U.S. Forest Service in the Pacific Northwest, known for founding research operations at the Wind River Experimental Forest.

== Early life ==
Thornton Taft Munger was born in North Adams, Massachusetts on October 3, 1883. Munger grew up next to the large estate of Hillhouse Woods, an eighteen-acre natural area, which facilitated his lifelong interest in forests. Munger went to Yale, graduating in 1905, also earning a master's degree in forestry from the school in 1908. After receiving his master's degree, Munger went to work for the U.S. Forest Service.

== Forest Service ==
Munger 2nd from left

In 1908, Munger was assigned to the Forest Service's new North Pacific District in Portland, Oregon. Almost immediately, Munger began his influential studies of the Douglas fir trees found in the western Cascades, establishing research plots in the Wind River area. In 1912, Munger established an arboretum in the area, the first of its kind in the Pacific Northwest. Munger used the arboretum to test the suitability of exotic trees in the specific climate and conditions of the Pacific Northwest. After working to further establish the Wind River Arboretum, as well as a nearby nursery, the area was selected by the Forest Service to be a permanent research site. In 1913, the Wind River Experiment Station was officially designated by the Forest Service. In 1924, the Wind River Experimental Station was replaced by the new Pacific Northwest Forest and Range Experiment Station, with offices in Portland, Oregon. Munger was selected as the first director of the Pacific Northwest Forest and Range Experiment Station.

Munger continued his research at Wind River until his retirement for the Forest Service in 1946. Wind River was the site of valuable long-term studies of plants and wildlife in the Pacific Northwest, with many of the projects continuing on for decades. Munger’s pioneering research legacy at Wind River was permanently honored following his death on August 11, 1975, when the Thornton T. Munger Research Natural Area was officially designated on Wind River Forest lands in 1977.

== Civic Activism ==
In the mid-1940s, Munger became the first chairman of the Forest Park Committee of Fifty, a committee created by the Portland City Club and the Mazamas to promote creation of a large forested park in the West Hills of Portland, Oregon. The city dedicated Forest Park in 1948. Munger later co-wrote a history of the park. The Committee of Fifty eventually became the Forest Park Conservancy.
