= Wind River Arboretum =

Research arboretum in Washington State, US

Coordinates: 45°47′57″N 121°56′4″W

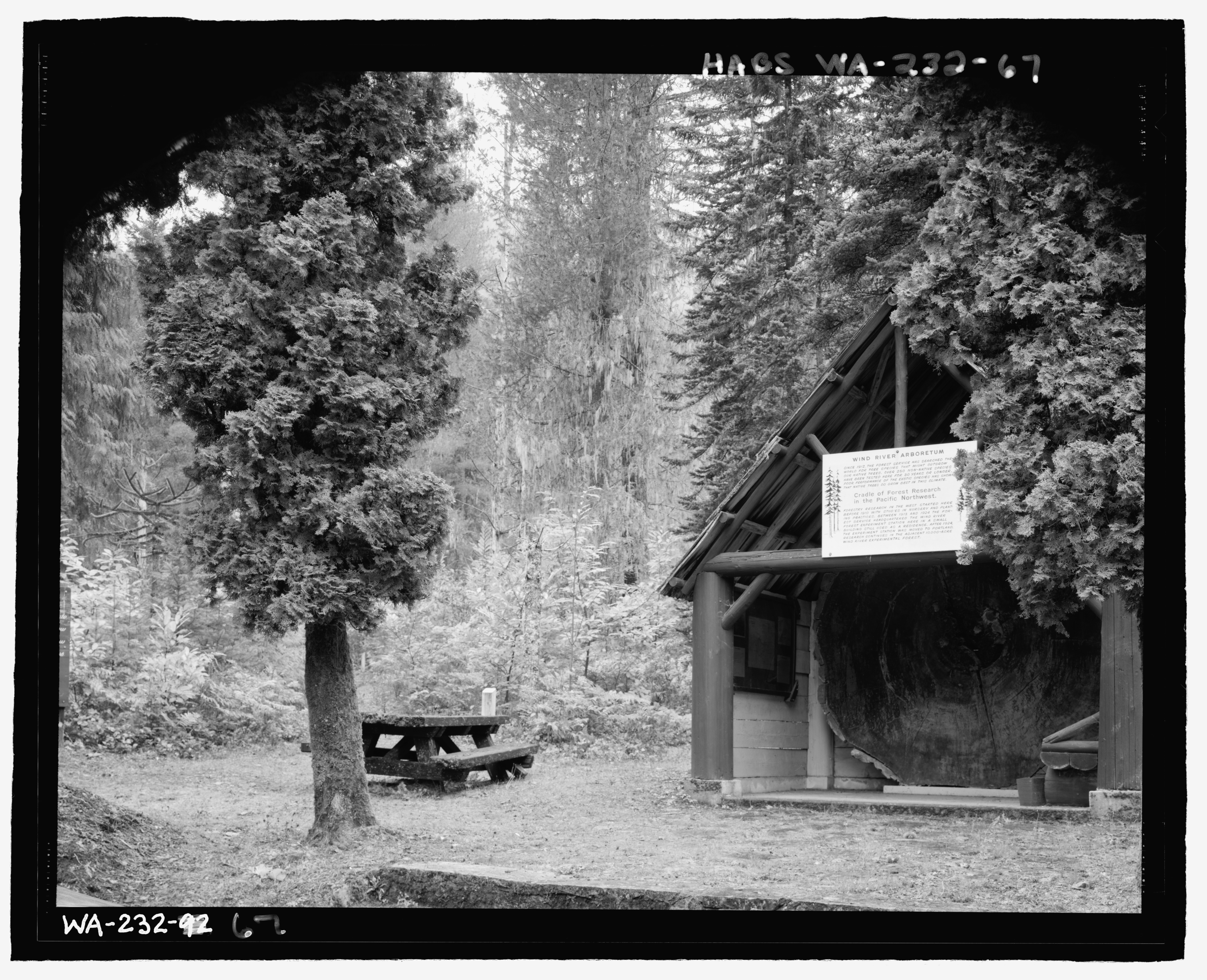
Entrance to the Wind River Arboretum

Wind River Arboretum, part of the Wind River Experimental Forest, is a research arboretum in the Gifford Pinchot National Forest in Carson, Washington, United States. It is the oldest arboretum in the Pacific Northwest.

== Description ==
The arboretum was established in 1912 by Thornton T. Munger of the United States Forest Service to determine the best trees for commercial purposes. Foresters planted tree species from various temperate and subtropical zones to compare their performance with local Pacific Northwest native tree species. After more than 90 years and 165 species tested, the general conclusion has been that native species are best adapted to the local environment. Most of the non-native species have died.

The Wind River is best known for its old-growth forests of Coast Douglas-fir and Western Hemlock. Other species include Western Redcedar and Pacific Silver Fir, grand fir, and noble fir. Understory trees include Pacific Yew, Vine Maple, Pacific Dogwood, and Red Alder. Much of the forest is more than 400 years old.

A section of the fallen Mineral Tree, recognized as of 2025 as the tallest Douglas fir ever recorded in the state, was given to the arboretum.

== See also ==
- List of botanical gardens in the United States
