= Skamania County, Washington =

County in Washington, United States

- County
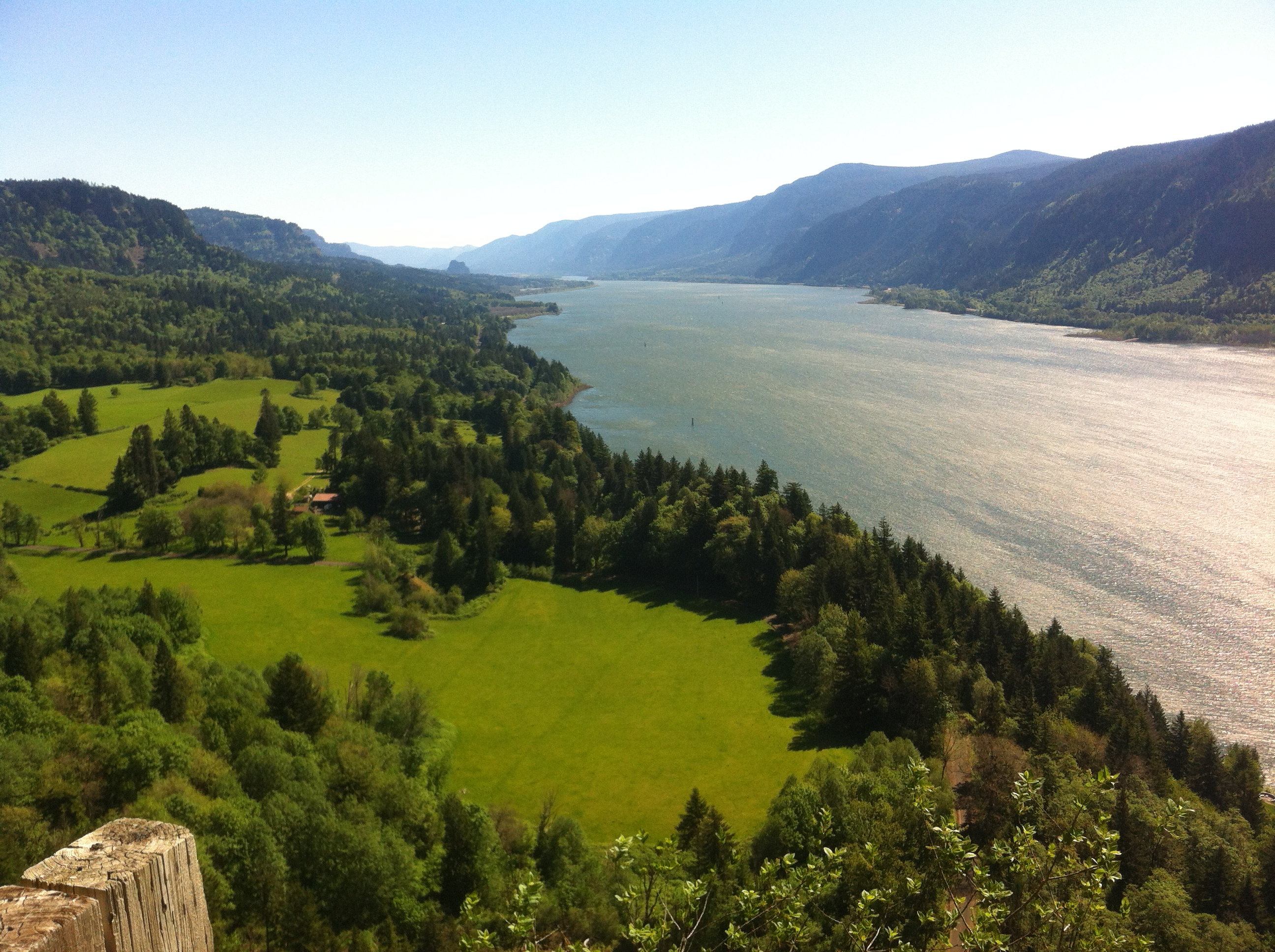
- Cape Horn Lookout, overlooking the Columbia River

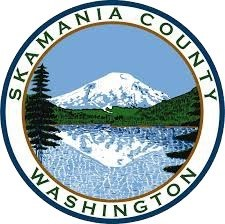
- Seal

- Location within the U.S. state of Washington
- Coordinates: 46°02′N 121°55′W
- Country: United States
- State: Washington
- Founded: March 9, 1854
- Seat: Stevenson
- Largest town: Carson

Government
  - Commissioners: List: Brian Nichols (R); Rob Farris (R); Asa Leckie (R)

Area
  - Total: 1,683 sq mi (4,360 km^{2})
  - Land: 1,656 sq mi (4,290 km^{2})
  - Water: 28 sq mi (73 km^{2}) 1.7%

Population (2020)
  - Total: 12,036
  - Estimate (2025): 12,669 ▲
  - Density: 7.15/sq mi (2.76/km^{2})
- Time zone: UTC−8 (Pacific)
  - Summer (DST): UTC−7 (PDT)
- Congressional district: 3rd
- Website: www.skamaniacounty.gov

Skamania County (/skəˈmeɪniə/ skə-MAY-nee-ə) is a county located in the U.S. state of Washington. As of the 2020 census, the population was 12,036. The county seat and largest incorporated city is Stevenson, although the Carson River Valley CDP is more populous. Skamania County is included in the Portland-Vancouver-Hillsboro, OR-WA Metropolitan Statistical Area.

== History ==
=== Etymology ===
The county was founded in 1854 and derives its name from the Cascades Chinook word sk'mániak, meaning 'swift waters'.

=== County beginnings ===
The area delineated by the future Washington state boundary began to be colonized at the start of the nineteenth century, both by Americans and British subjects. However, the majority of British exploration and interest in the land was due to the fur trade, whereas American settlers were principally seeking land for agriculture and cattle raising. The Treaty of 1818 provided for the region to be an Anglo-American condominium. During this period, the future Washington Territory was divided into two administrative zones: Clarke County (now Clark County) and Lewis County (made official in 1845).

The condominium was unwieldy and led to continual argument, and occasional conflict. The status of the Washington area was settled in 1846, when the Oregon Treaty ceded the land south of North latitude 49 degrees to American control.

On March 9, 1854, Skamania County was split from the original Clarke County and stretched east to the Rocky Mountains in present-day Montana. Walla Walla County was split from the portions of Skamania County east of the Deschutes River on April 24. The county lost its eastern edge during the creation of Klickitat County in 1861.

The territorial legislature dissolved Skamania County and divided its land between Clarke and Klickitat counties in January 1865 during a taxing dispute with the Oregon Steam Navigation Company. The dissolution was repealed in 1867 after intervention from the U.S. Congress. After that, Skamania County retained its shape, including through the period after Washington became the 42nd state of the Union in 1889. Fort Cascades, built to protect the Columbia River, served as an early county seat, but the county seat has been in Stevenson since 1893.

=== 20th century to present day ===
Skamania County is also known for enacting what has been described as the "Bigfoot Ordinance", passed by the Board of County Commissioners at its meeting of April 1, 1969, and published twice in the Skamania County Pioneer, the newspaper of highest circulation in the county, as required by law. The ordinance forbids the slaying of any "nocturnal primate mammal variously described as an ape-like creature or a sub-species of Homo sapiens ... generally and commonly known as a 'Sasquatch', 'Yeti', 'Bigfoot', or 'Giant Hairy ape'", subject to a maximum penalty of a $10,000 fine and five years imprisonment. Although its passage coincided with April Fool's Day, Ordinance 69-01 was real, was amended in 1984, and has not been repealed. Its purposes included protection of residents and visitors from in the county from a very real concern, "an influx of scientific investigators as well as casual hunters, many armed with lethal weapons", who had been attracted to the area by reported sightings of a creature.

Mt. St. Helens, which is located in Skamania County, erupted in 1980.

== Geography ==
According to the United States Census Bureau, the county has a total area of 1,684 square miles (4,360 km^{2}), of which 1,656 square miles (4,290 km^{2}) is land and 28 square miles (73 km^{2}), or 1.7%, is water. 90% of Skamania is forested and 80% is a part of Gifford Pinchot National Forest. The highest elevation in the county is 8,920 feet (2,720 m), on the slopes of Mount Adams, although prior to its eruption, Mount Saint Helens was the highest point at 9,677 feet (2,950 m).

=== Geographic features ===
- Cascade Mountains
- Columbia River
- Mount St. Helens
- Indian Heaven

=== Major highways ===
- State Route 14
- Wind River Highway

=== Adjacent counties ===
- Lewis County - north
- Yakima County - northeast
- Klickitat County - east
- Hood River County, Oregon - south
- Multnomah County, Oregon - southwest
- Clark County - west
- Cowlitz County - west

== Demographics ==
Historical population
Census	Pop.	Note	%±
1860	173		—
1870	133		−23.1%
1880	809		508.3%
1890	774		−4.3%
1900	1,688		118.1%
1910	2,887		71.0%
1920	2,357		−18.4%
1930	2,891		22.7%
1940	4,633		60.3%
1950	4,788		3.3%
1960	5,207		8.8%
1970	5,845		12.3%
1980	7,919		35.5%
1990	8,289		4.7%
2000	9,872		19.1%
2010	11,066		12.1%
2020	12,036		8.8%
2025 (est.)	12,669	▲	5.3%
U.S. Decennial Census; 1790–1960 1900–1990; 1990–2000 2010–2020

=== Racial and ethnic composition ===
Skamania County, Washington – Racial and ethnic composition Note: the US Census treats Hispanic/Latino as an ethnic category. This table excludes Latinos from the racial categories and assigns them to a separate category. Hispanics/Latinos may be of any race.
Race / Ethnicity (NH = Non-Hispanic)	Pop 1980	Pop 1990	Pop 2000	Pop 2010	Pop 2020	% 1980	% 1990	% 2000	% 2010	% 2020
White alone (NH)	7,697	7,868	8,922	9,918	10,060	97.20%	94.92%	90.38%	89.63%	83.58%
Black or African American alone (NH)	7	4	30	44	72	0.09%	0.05%	0.30%	0.40%	0.60%
Native American or Alaska Native alone (NH)	94	195	205	150	170	1.19%	2.35%	2.08%	1.36%	1.41%
Asian alone (NH)	27	49	53	96	120	0.34%	0.59%	0.54%	0.87%	1.00%
Native Hawaiian or Pacific Islander alone (NH)	x	x	5	11	29	x	x	0.05%	0.10%	0.24%
Other race alone (NH)	13	1	69	7	79	0.16%	0.01%	0.70%	0.06%	0.66%
Mixed race or Multiracial (NH)	x	x	190	287	741	x	x	1.92%	2.59%	6.16%
Hispanic or Latino (any race)	81	172	398	553	765	1.02%	2.08%	4.03%	5.00%	6.36%
Total	7,919	8,289	9,872	11,066	12,036	100.00%	100.00%	100.00%	100.00%	100.00%

=== 2020 census ===
As of the 2020 census, there were 12,036 people, 4,748 households, and 3,199 families residing in the county. The population density was 7.3 inhabitants per square mile (2.8/km^{2}). There were 5,796 housing units at an average density of 3.5 inhabitants per square mile (1.4/km^{2}).

Of the residents, 18.6% were under the age of 18, 3.7% were under the age of five, and 21.6% were 65 years of age or older; the median age was 47.0 years. For every 100 females there were 105.8 males, and for every 100 females age 18 and over there were 105.5 males. 0.0% of residents lived in urban areas and 100.0% lived in rural areas.

The racial makeup of the county was 85.6% White, 0.6% Black or African American, 1.6% American Indian and Alaska Native, 1.0% Asian, 2.4% from some other race, and 8.5% from two or more races. Hispanic or Latino residents of any race comprised 6.4% of the population.

There were 4,748 households in the county, of which 26.8% had children under the age of 18 living with them and 19.6% had a female householder with no spouse or partner present. About 25.4% of all households were made up of individuals and 11.6% had someone living alone who was 65 years of age or older.

Of the 5,796 housing units, 18.1% were vacant. Among occupied housing units, 76.2% were owner-occupied and 23.8% were renter-occupied. The homeowner vacancy rate was 1.2% and the rental vacancy rate was 5.1%.

=== 2010 census ===
As of the 2010 census, there were 11,066 people, 4,522 households, and 3,072 families living in the county. The population density was 6.7 people per square mile (2.6 people/km^{2}). There were 5,628 housing units at an average density of 3.4 units per square mile (1.3 units/km^{2}). The racial makeup of the county was 92.8% white, 1.6% American Indian, 0.9% Asian, 0.4% black or African American, 0.1% Pacific islander, 1.3% from other races, and 3.0% from two or more races. Those of Hispanic or Latino origin made up 5.0% of the population. In terms of ancestry, 20.6% were German, 15.7% were Irish, 11.0% were English, 6.3% were Norwegian, and 5.0% were American.

Of the 4,522 households, 28.4% had children under the age of 18 living with them, 54.3% were married couples living together, 8.9% had a female householder with no husband present, 32.1% were non-families, and 25.6% of all households were made up of individuals. The average household size was 2.44 and the average family size was 2.92. The median age was 44.0 years.

=== 2000 census ===
As of the 2000 census, there were 9,872 people, 3,755 households, and 2,756 families living in the county. The population density was 6 people per square mile (2.3 people/km^{2}). There were 4,576 housing units at an average density of 3 units per square mile (1.2 units/km^{2}). The racial makeup of the county was 92.11% White, 0.30% Black or African American, 2.20% Native American, 0.54% Asian, 0.17% Pacific Islander, 2.43% from other races, and 2.25% from two or more races. 4.03% of the population were Hispanic or Latino of any race. 17.7% were of German, 12.5% English, 12.1% Irish, 11.2% United States or American and 5.2% Norwegian ancestry.

There were 3,755 households, out of which 34.00% had children under the age of 18 living with them, 60.50% were married couples living together, 8.20% had a female householder with no husband present, and 26.60% were non-families. 21.10% of all households were made up of individuals, and 6.60% had someone living alone who was 65 years of age or older. The average household size was 2.61 and the average family size was 3.02.

In the county, the population was spread out, with 26.60% under the age of 18, 6.70% from 18 to 24, 28.60% from 25 to 44, 27.10% from 45 to 64, and 11.00% who were 65 years of age or older. The median age was 39 years. For every 100 females there were 101.30 males. For every 100 females age 18 and over, there were 99.40 males.

The median income for a household in the county was $39,317, and the median income for a family was $44,586. Males had a median income of $36,732 versus $25,130 for females. The per capita income for the county was $18,002. About 10.00% of families and 13.10% of the population were below the poverty line, including 18.10% of those under age 18 and 7.90% of those age 65 or over.

In the year 2000 there were more Seventh-day Adventists in Skamania County than adherents of any other religious group. Skamania County is the only county in the United States for which this is true. Currently, this honor belongs to the state of Washington.

== Recreation ==
- Skamania County has abundant trails within its borders, including hiking at the Columbia River Gorge and Gifford Pinchot National Forest, which includes the Mount St. Helens National Volcanic Monument. The Pacific Crest Trail passes through Skamania County.
- Fishing in Skamania County allows for the opportunity to catch certain popular species such as rainbow trout, steelhead and bass.
- The Columbia Gorge Museum, in Stevenson, examines the geologic and human past in the Columbia River Gorge.
- The Lewis and Clark Expedition passed through Skamania County, and some of their campsites can be visited.
- Historical markers are located in several areas, such as Fort Cascades and Fort Raines, both built in the 1850s to protect the portage road around the Cascades Rapids.
- Kiteboarding and windsurfing are seasonal sports popular in the Columbia River Gorge.

=== Parks and other protected areas ===
==== County parks ====
- Prindle Park is a county-maintained park with picnic facilities and a playground.
- Big Cedars Campground is a county-maintained campground with primitive campsites.
- Home Valley Campground is another county-maintained camping area.

==== State parks ====
- Beacon Rock State Park offers hiking, camping, rock climbing, and picnicking facilities.

==== Sites maintained by the US Forest Service ====
- Sams Walker Day Use Site offers an interpretive trail, access to the Columbia River, and opportunities to view wildlife. Portions of it are typically wheelchair-accessible. However, vegetation growth sometimes prevents people in wheelchairs from using the trails.
- St. Cloud Day Use Site features a short, easy trail through a meadow, picnic area, access to the Columbia River and wildlife viewing opportunities.

==== National protected areas ====
- Franz Lake National Wildlife Refuge
- Gifford Pinchot National Forest (part)
- Mount St. Helens National Monument (part)
- Pierce National Wildlife Refuge
- Wind River Arboretum
- Wind River Experimental Forest

== Communities ==
=== Cities ===
- North Bonneville
- Stevenson (county seat)

=== Census-designated place ===
- Carson
- Carson River Valley (former)

=== Unincorporated communities ===
- Cook
- Mill A
- Skamania
- Stabler (also known as Hemlock)
- Underwood
- West End
- Willard

== Politics ==
Skamania County is a fairly competitive county in presidential elections. The Republicans and Democrats won the county four times each between 1988 and 2016. In 2020, despite the margin narrowing from 2016, Trump won the largest share of the vote in the county for a Republican since Herbert Hoover in 1928, and in 2024 the county swung towards Republicans by under 1 percentage point.

United States presidential election results for Skamania County, Washington
Year	Republican		Democratic		Third party(ies)	
Year	No.	%	No.	%	No.	%
1892	91	39.74%	99	43.23%	39	17.03%
1896	122	32.28%	252	66.67%	4	1.06%
1900	175	45.10%	203	52.32%	10	2.58%
1904	297	68.43%	61	14.06%	76	17.51%
1908	310	60.08%	143	27.71%	63	12.21%
1912	251	30.24%	262	31.57%	317	38.19%
1916	489	49.95%	451	46.07%	39	3.98%
1920	409	52.71%	247	31.83%	120	15.46%
1924	533	52.15%	207	20.25%	282	27.59%
1928	631	55.99%	473	41.97%	23	2.04%
1932	444	30.37%	934	63.89%	84	5.75%
1936	406	17.58%	1,863	80.65%	41	1.77%
1940	765	36.80%	1,292	62.15%	22	1.06%
1944	668	40.56%	968	58.77%	11	0.67%
1948	707	38.38%	1,067	57.93%	68	3.69%
1952	1,072	52.29%	978	47.71%	0	0.00%
1956	1,014	45.90%	1,193	54.01%	2	0.09%
1960	1,032	44.75%	1,269	55.03%	5	0.22%
1964	653	27.05%	1,758	72.83%	3	0.12%
1968	968	40.67%	1,221	51.30%	191	8.03%
1972	1,288	48.70%	1,153	43.59%	204	7.71%
1976	1,102	41.55%	1,436	54.15%	114	4.30%
1980	1,416	45.75%	1,373	44.36%	306	9.89%
1984	1,736	51.99%	1,552	46.48%	51	1.53%
1988	1,356	42.88%	1,748	55.28%	58	1.83%
1992	1,102	29.95%	1,474	40.05%	1,104	30.00%
1996	1,387	36.61%	1,724	45.50%	678	17.89%
2000	2,151	50.62%	1,753	41.26%	345	8.12%
2004	2,695	52.24%	2,374	46.02%	90	1.74%
2008	2,524	45.97%	2,817	51.31%	149	2.71%
2012	2,687	49.16%	2,628	48.08%	151	2.76%
2016	2,928	50.23%	2,232	38.29%	669	11.48%
2020	3,885	53.13%	3,192	43.65%	235	3.21%
2024	3,961	53.85%	3,147	42.79%	247	3.36%

== See also ==
- National Register of Historic Places listings in Skamania County, Washington
