= Stevenson, Washington =

Stevenson
- City
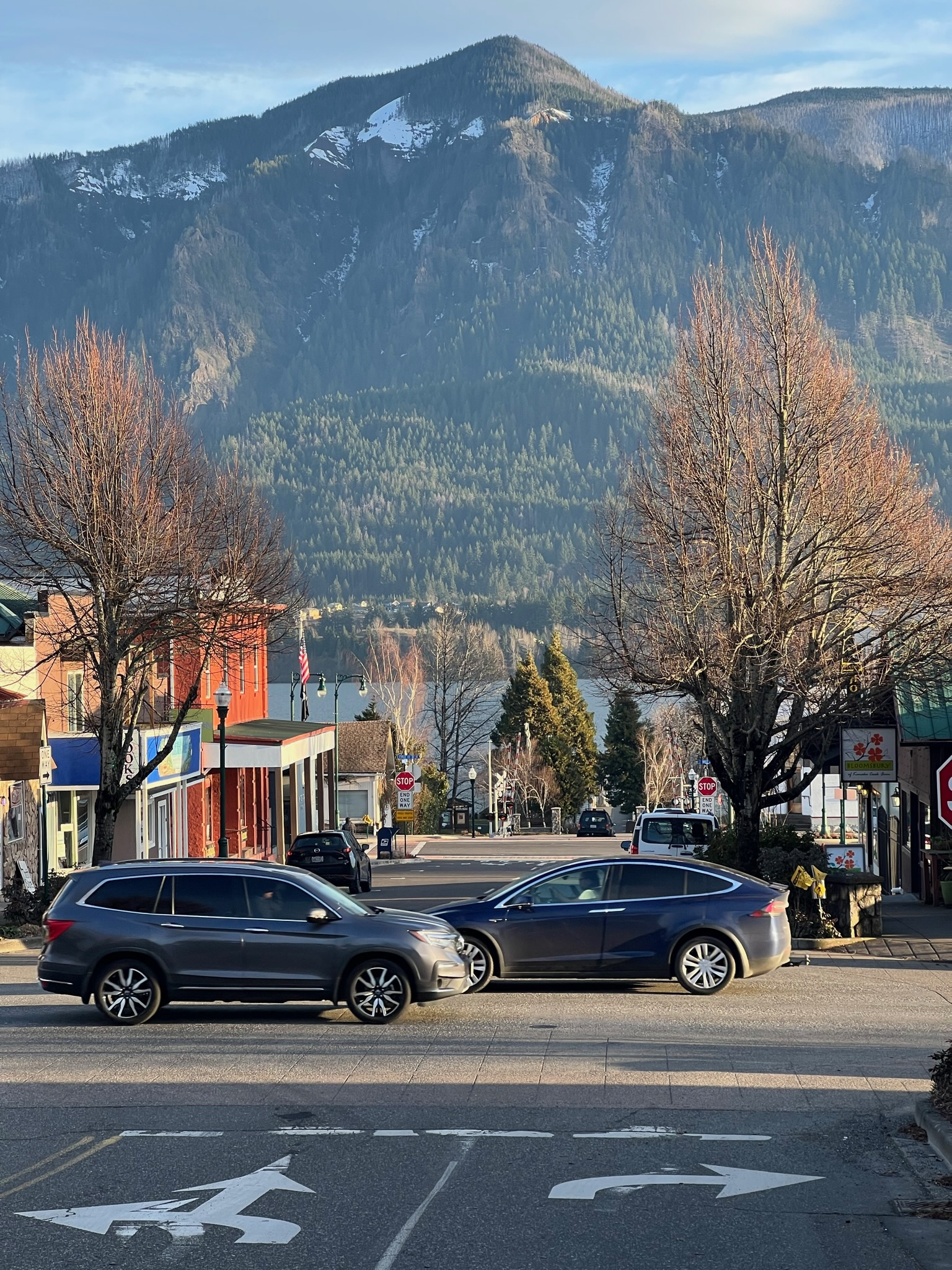
- Facing south toward the Columbia River from 2nd Avenue

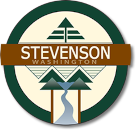
- Seal

- Location of Stevenson, Washington
- Coordinates: 45°41′56″N 121°53′05″W
- Country: United States
- State: Washington
- County: Skamania

Government
  - Type: Mayor–council
  - Mayor: Jennifer Taylor

Area
  - Total: 1.79 sq mi (4.64 km^{2})
  - Land: 1.64 sq mi (4.26 km^{2})
  - Water: 0.15 sq mi (0.38 km^{2})
- Elevation: 102 ft (31 m)

Population (2020)
  - Total: 1,491
  - Estimate (2025): 1,596
  - Density: 906/sq mi (350/km^{2})
- Time zone: UTC-8 (Pacific (PST))
  - Summer (DST): UTC-7 (PDT)
- ZIP code: 98648
- Area code: 509
- FIPS code: 53-67875
- GNIS feature ID: 2411980
- Website: stevensonwa.gov

Stevenson is a city along the Columbia River in Skamania County, Washington, United States. It is the county seat of Skamania County and part of the Portland metropolitan area. The city also lies within the Columbia River Gorge National Scenic Area and is across the river from Cascade Locks, Oregon. The population was 1,491 at the 2020 census.

Stevenson is home to the Columbia Gorge Museum, which interprets the natural and cultural heritage of the Columbia River Gorge, and Skamania Lodge, a luxury resort.

== History ==
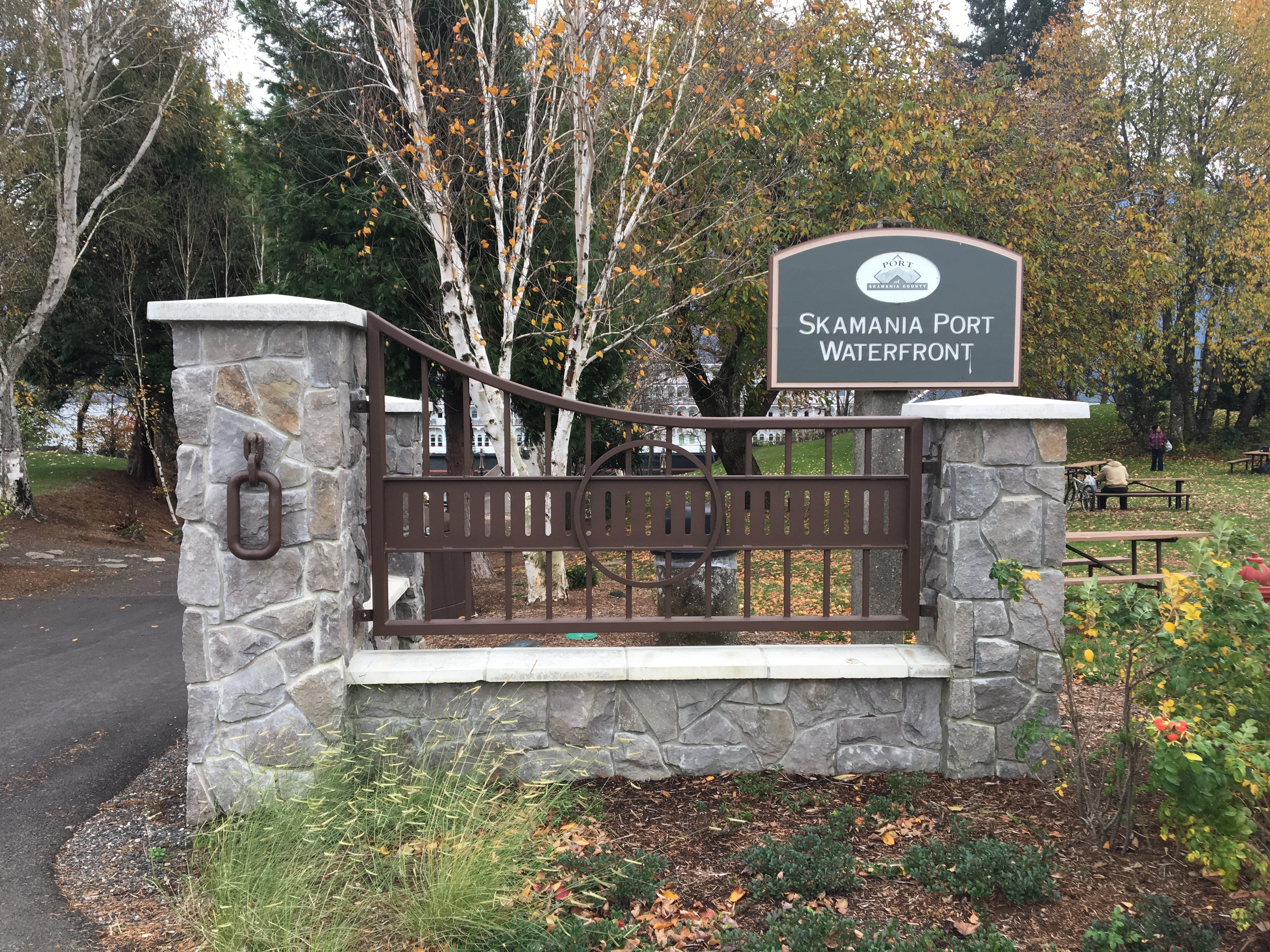
Entrance to the Port of Skamania County in Stevenson, November 2016

Stevenson is named for early settler George H. Stevenson. The Stevenson family, who settled in the Gorge in the 1800s from Missouri, founded the town of Stevenson on the old Shepard donation land claim. Under the auspices of the Stevenson Land Company, George Stevenson purchased the original townsite for $24,000 in 1893, building the town along the lower flat near the river. Settlers expanded the original dock to serve the daily arrivals of sternwheelers unloading passengers, cargo and loading logs.

In 1893, in a dispute over rental fees, an unknown crew transported the county records from the town of Cascades to Stevenson. Stevenson became the county seat of Skamania overnight. Stevenson was officially incorporated on December 16, 1907. In 1908 the Spokane, Portland and Seattle Railway arrived, pushing the town up the hill away from the river. Streets were graded, wooden sidewalks constructed and the city asked residents to keep their cows from roaming the streets.

== Geography ==
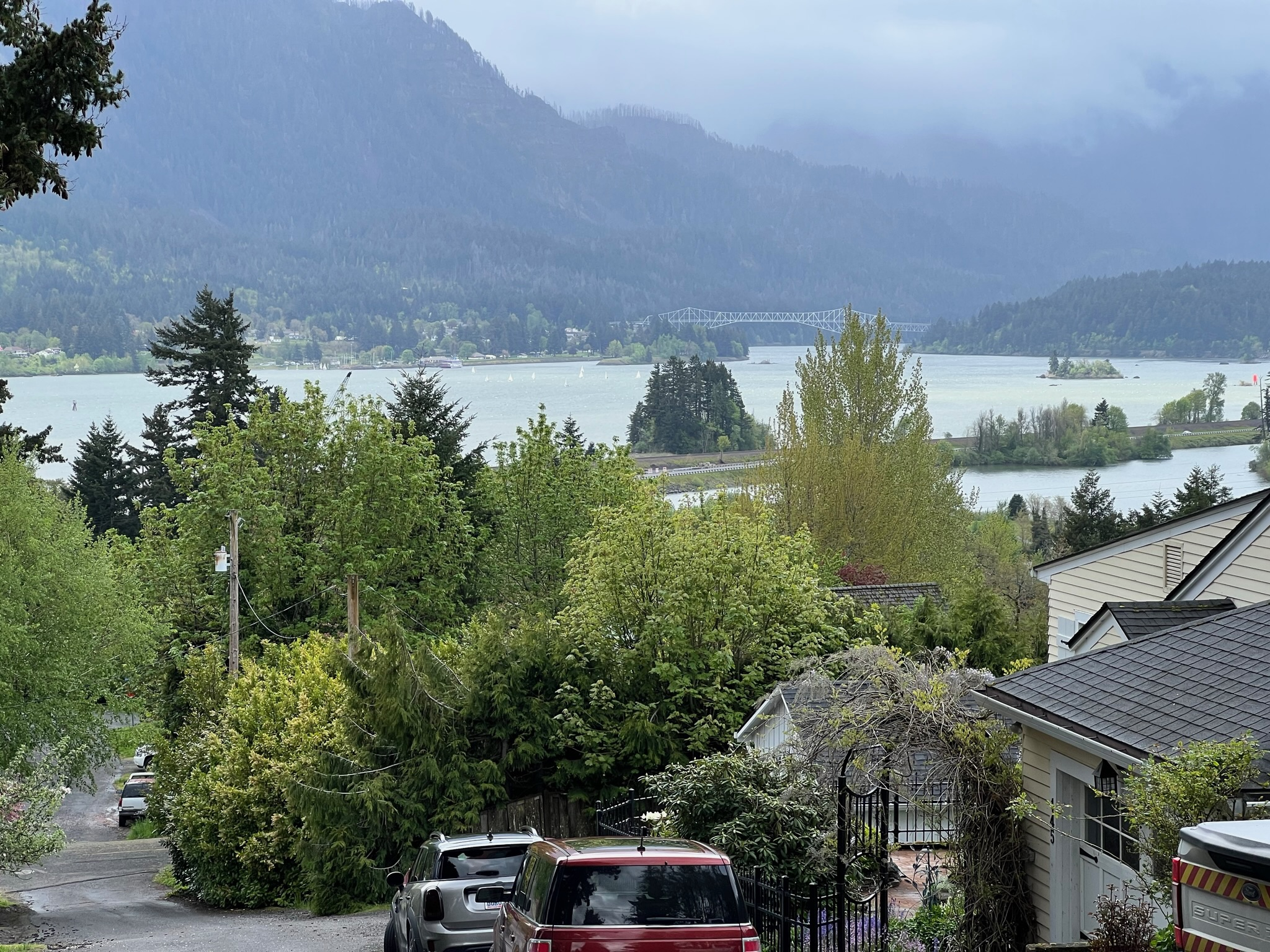
View of the Columbia River from Stevenson

The city is situated on the north bank of the Columbia River within the Columbia River Gorge National Scenic Area and is the county seat of Skamania County. Stevenson is approximately 45 miles (72 km) east of Portland, Oregon, and 20 miles (32 km) west of Hood River. Across the river to the south is the city of Cascade Locks in Hood River County, Oregon, which is connected via the Bridge of the Gods, a toll bridge that also carries the Pacific Crest Trail. The bridge is 3 miles (4.8 km) southwest of Stevenson and is the only crossing of the Columbia River between Portland and Hood River.

According to the United States Census Bureau, Stevenson has a total area of 1.79 square miles (4.6 km^{2}), of which 1.65 square miles (4.3 km^{2}) is land and 0.14 square miles (0.36 km^{2}) is water. The city lies at an elevation of about 102 feet (31 m) above sea level where basalt cliffs rise steeply to the north. The Columbia widens here into a straight reach that funnels dependable winds, and the city's waterfront at Bob's Beach is a popular launch site for windsurfers and kiteboarders.

=== Climate ===
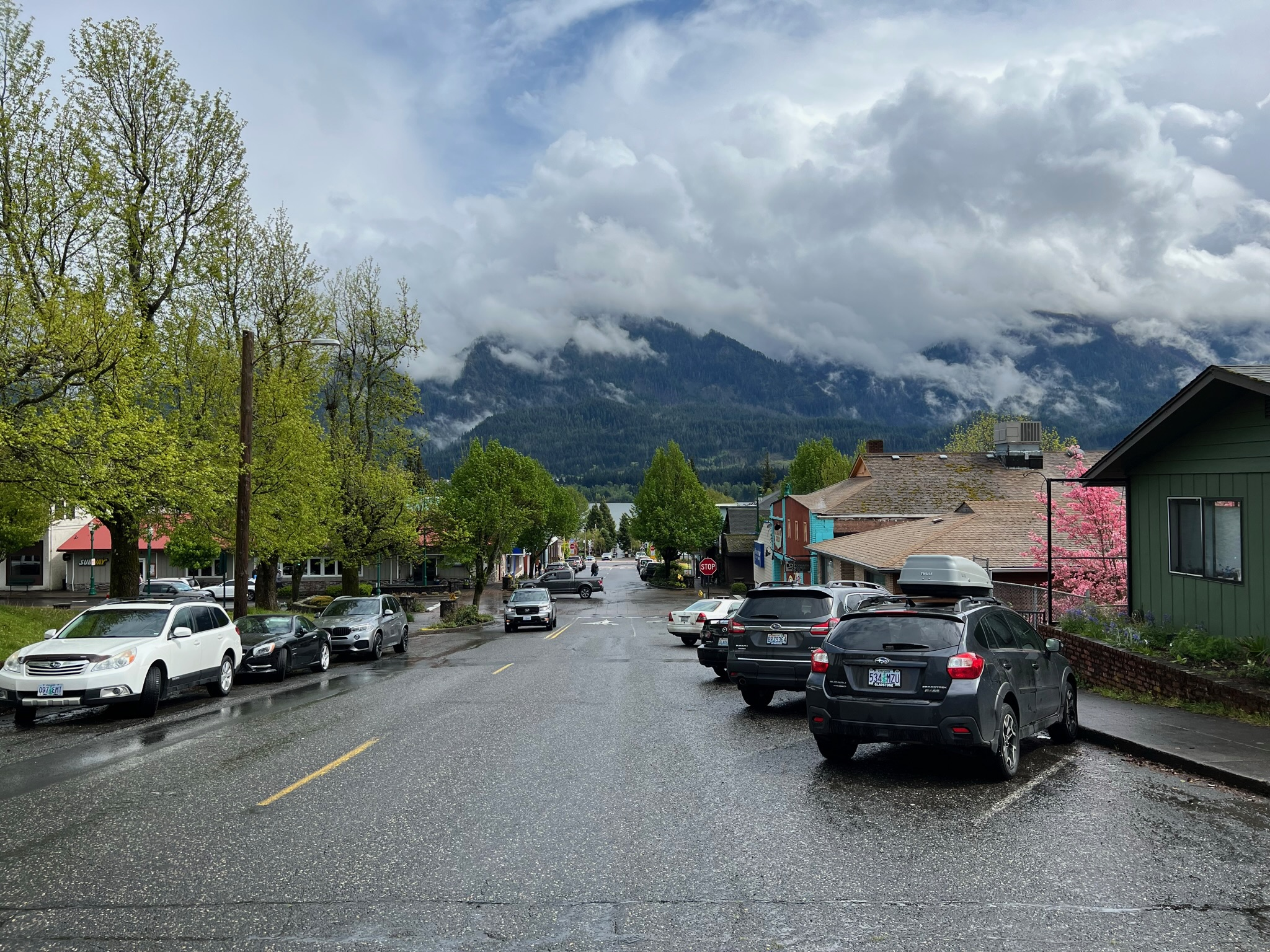
Stevenson in May 2022.

Located in the western Columbia River Gorge, Stevenson has a warm‑summer Mediterranean climate (Köppen: Csb) that blends the wet marine influence of the Cascades' west side with the drier interior plateau to the east. Summers are warm and distinctly dry: the average high in July is about 82 °F (28 °C), and the month typically receives only 0.6 in (15 mm) of rain.

Winters are cool, wet, and occasionally snowy; January's mean temperature is around 35 °F (2 °C) and average precipitation exceeds 11 in (280 mm). Annual rainfall varies with elevation, ranging from about 66 in (1,700 mm) at gauges near the river to more than 80 in (2,000 mm) on the surrounding forested slopes.

Snowfall averages roughly 13 in (33 cm) per year, but sporadic Arctic‑air outflow events funneling through the Gorge can deliver heavier snow and freezing rain.

Persistent gap winds—typically 15 mph (24 km/h)–25 mph (40 km/h) westerlies in the warm season and strong easterlies during winter outbreaks—make Stevenson's waterfront "one of the windiest spots in the Gorge", and a popular venue for wind‑powered recreation. These winds arise from pressure‑gradient‑driven gap flow through the Gorge, which can generate high‑wind conditions in towns along the Columbia River year‑round.

Climate data for Stevenson, Washington
Month	Jan	Feb	Mar	Apr	May	Jun	Jul	Aug	Sep	Oct	Nov	Dec	Year
Record high °F (°C)	58 (14)	64 (18)	77 (25)	89 (32)	99 (37)	102 (39)	105 (41)	103 (39)	100 (38)	84 (29)	64 (18)	58 (14)	105 (41)
Mean daily maximum °F (°C)	37.9 (3.3)	42.6 (5.9)	50.5 (10.3)	57.4 (14.1)	65 (18)	71.4 (21.9)	80 (27)	80.6 (27.0)	73.4 (23.0)	60.5 (15.8)	45.7 (7.6)	37.3 (2.9)	58.5 (14.7)
Daily mean °F (°C)	32.8 (0.4)	35.5 (1.9)	40.9 (4.9)	46 (8)	52.6 (11.4)	58.3 (14.6)	64.3 (17.9)	64.1 (17.8)	58. (14)	48.4 (9.1)	39.1 (3.9)	32.5 (0.3)	47.7 (8.7)
Mean daily minimum °F (°C)	27.6 (−2.4)	28.3 (−2.1)	31.4 (−0.3)	34.6 (1.4)	40.2 (4.6)	45.3 (7.4)	48.5 (9.2)	47.6 (8.7)	42.7 (5.9)	36.3 (2.4)	32.6 (0.3)	27.8 (−2.3)	36.9 (2.7)
Record low °F (°C)	−9 (−23)	−4 (−20)	11 (−12)	24 (−4)	27 (−3)	30 (−1)	34 (1)	30 (−1)	26 (−3)	15 (−9)	−2 (−19)	−7 (−22)	−9 (−23)
Average precipitation inches (mm)	13.9 (350)	11.2 (280)	9.1 (230)	6.1 (150)	3.4 (86)	2.3 (58)	0.6 (15)	0.9 (23)	2.7 (69)	6.4 (160)	13.8 (350)	15.3 (390)	85.8 (2,180)
Average snowfall inches (cm)	23.4 (59)	14.6 (37)	5.3 (13)	0 (0)	0.0 (0.0)	0.0 (0.0)	0.0 (0.0)	0 (0)	0.0 (0.0)	0.1 (0.25)	7.3 (19)	21.5 (55)	73 (190)
Average precipitation days (≥ 0.01 in.)	19	16	18	16	12	9	3	4	7	12	19	19	154
Source: WeatherBase

== Demographics ==
Historical population
Census	Pop.	Note	%±
1910	387		—
1920	348		−10.1%
1930	400		14.9%
1940	563		40.8%
1950	584		3.7%
1960	927		58.7%
1970	916		−1.2%
1980	1,172		27.9%
1990	1,147		−2.1%
2000	1,200		4.6%
2010	1,465		22.1%
2020	1,491		1.8%
2025 (est.)	1,596		7.0%
U.S. Decennial Census; 2020 Census

=== 2020 census ===
As of the 2020 census, Stevenson had a population of 1,491, 684 households, and 399 families residing in the city.

There were 747 housing units, of which 8.4% were vacant. The homeowner vacancy rate was 1.1% and the rental vacancy rate was 1.5%.

Of the 684 households in Stevenson, 27.5% had children under the age of 18 living in them. Of all households, 43.6% were married-couple households, 21.2% were households with a male householder and no spouse or partner present, and 28.4% were households with a female householder and no spouse or partner present. About 32.6% of all households were made up of individuals and 15.3% had someone living alone who was 65 years of age or older. The average household size was 2.15 and the average family size was 2.73.

The median age was 47.6 years, 18.0% of residents were under the age of 18, and 23.7% were 65 years of age or older. For every 100 females there were 97.7 males, and for every 100 females age 18 and over there were 94.3 males age 18 and over.

0.0% of residents lived in urban areas, while 100.0% lived in rural areas.

Racial composition as of the 2020 census
Race	Number	Percent
White	1,303	87.4%
Black or African American	0	0.0%
American Indian and Alaska Native	23	1.5%
Asian	20	1.3%
Native Hawaiian and Other Pacific Islander	1	0.1%
Some other race	32	2.1%
Two or more races	112	7.5%
Hispanic or Latino (of any race)	83	5.6%

=== 2010 census ===
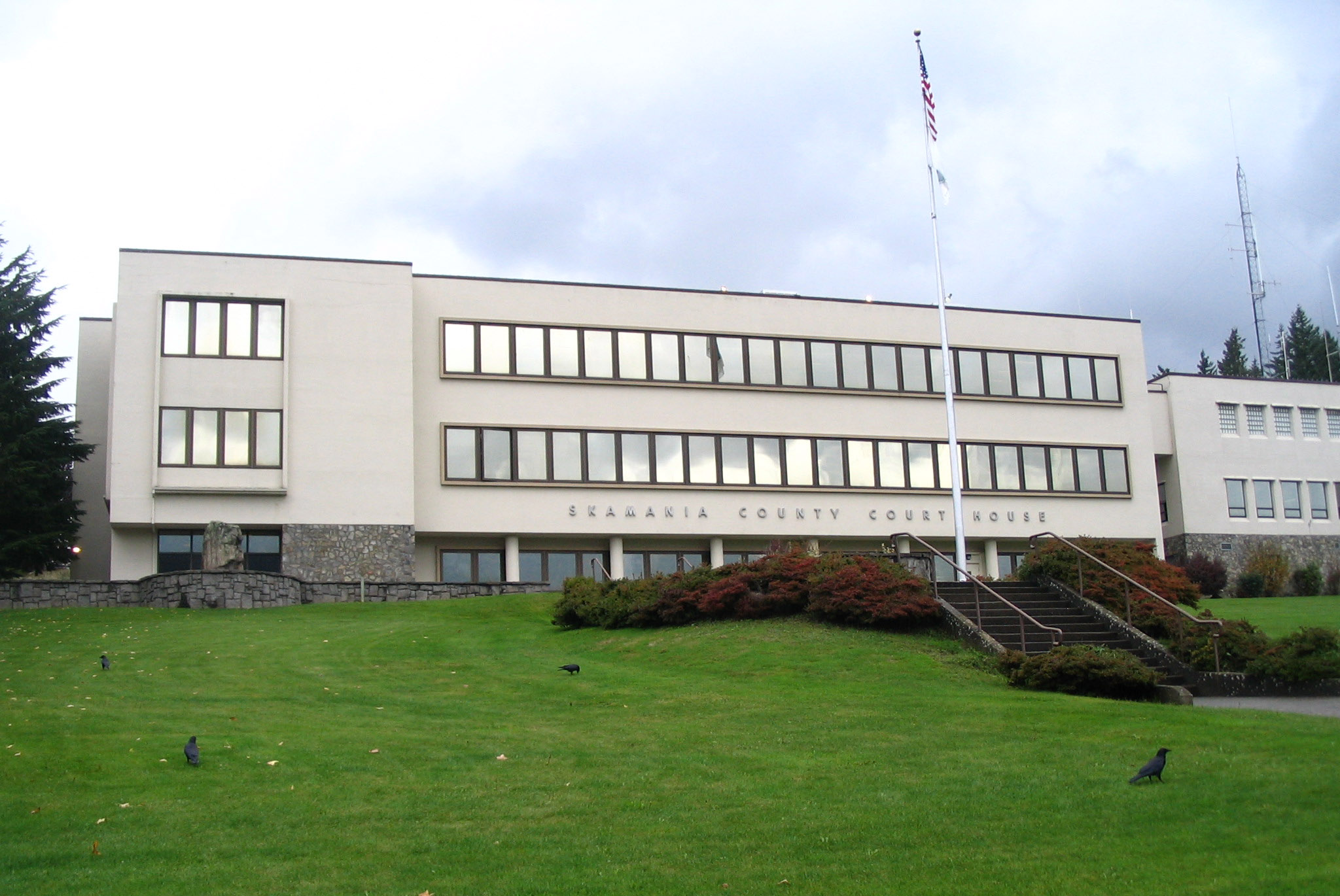
The Skamania County Courthouse, one of the most prominent buildings in Stevenson

At the 2010 census there were 1,465 people in 640 households, including 390 families, in the city. The population density was 887.9 inhabitants per square mile (342.8/km^{2}). There were 703 housing units at an average density of 426.1 per square mile (164.5/km^{2}). The racial makeup of the city was 93.9% White, 0.6% African American, 1.8% Native American, 0.5% Asian, 0.1% Pacific Islander, 0.5% from other races, and 2.6% from two or more races. Hispanic or Latino of any race were 5.8%.

Of the 640 households, 28.6% had children under the age of 18 living with them, 41.3% were married couples living together, 15.9% had a female householder with no husband present, 3.8% had a male householder with no wife present, and 39.1% were non-families. 33.4% of households were one person and 12.8% were one person aged 65 or older. The average household size was 2.25 and the average family size was 2.86.

The median age was 42.1 years. 23% of residents were under the age of 18; 6.6% were between the ages of 18 and 24; 24.5% were from 25 to 44; 30.6% were from 45 to 64; and 15.3% were 65 or older. The gender makeup of the city was 47.1% male and 52.9% female.

=== 2000 census ===
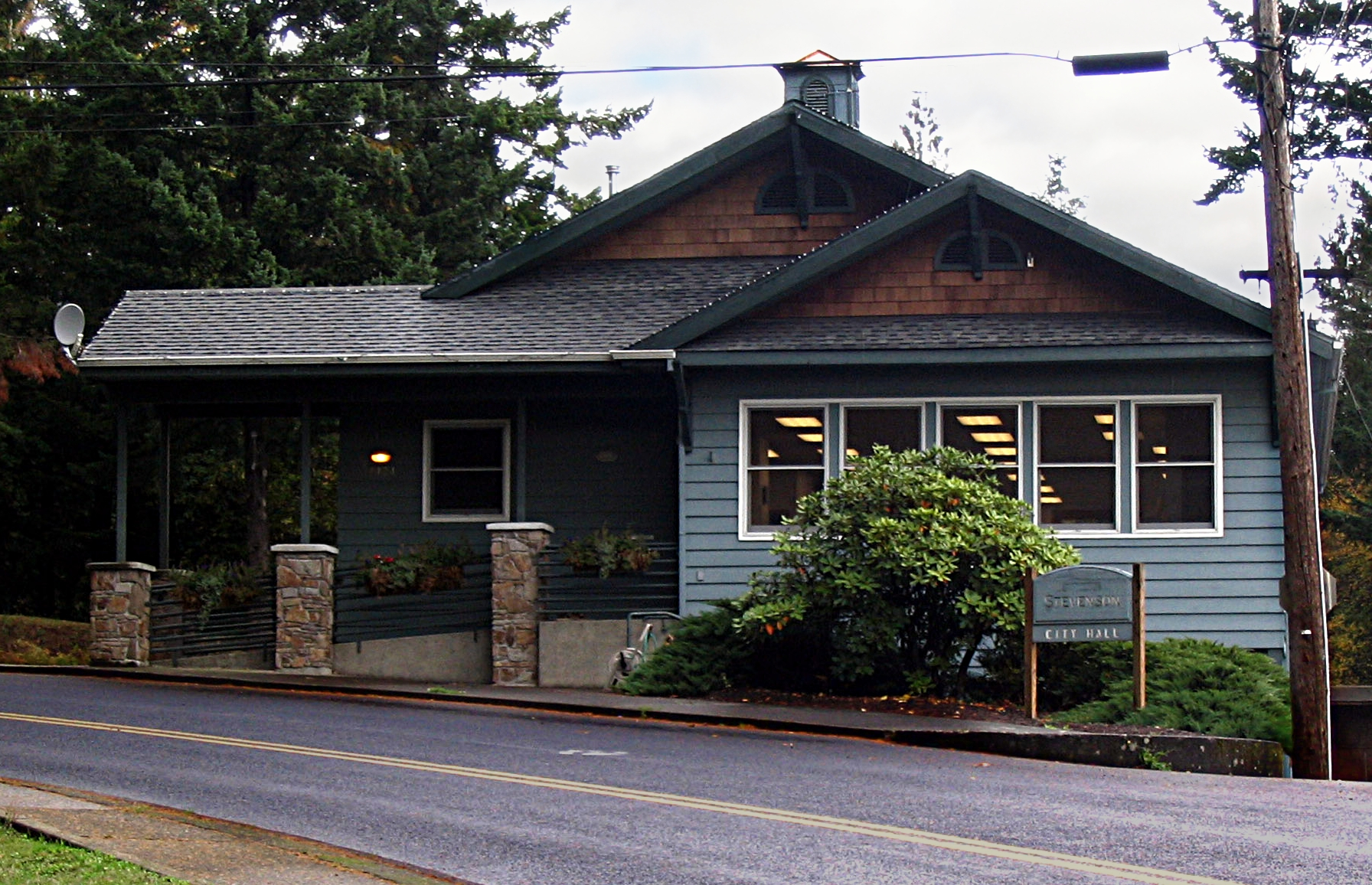
Stevenson's city hall

As of the 2000 census, there were 1,200 people in 474 households, including 307 families, in the city. The population density was 813.4 people per square mile (313.1/km^{2}). There were 523 housing units at an average density of 354.5 per square mile (136.4/km^{2}). The racial makeup of the city was 91.92% White, 0.17% African American, 2.42% Native American, 0.58% Asian, 1.75% from other races, and 3.17% from two or more races. Hispanic or Latino of any race were 5.33% of the population.

Of the 474 households, 31.6% had children under the age of 18 living with them, 46.2% were married couples living together, 14.6% had a female householder with no husband present, and 35.2% were non-families. 29.5% of households were one person and 10.1% were one person aged 65 or older. The average household size was 2.41 and the average family size was 2.95.

In the city, the age distribution of the population shows 25.1% under the age of 18, 9.8% from 18 to 24, 25.8% from 25 to 44, 25.5% from 45 to 64, and 13.9% 65 or older. The median age was 39 years. For every 100 females, there were 91.1 males. For every 100 females age 18 and over, there were 87.7 males.

The median household income was $31,979 and the median family income was $38,750. Males had a median income of $36,042 versus $25,893 for females. The per capita income for the city was $15,602. About 17.8% of families and 22.8% of the population were below the poverty line, including 30.2% of those under age 18 and 17.0% of those age 65 or over.

== Education ==
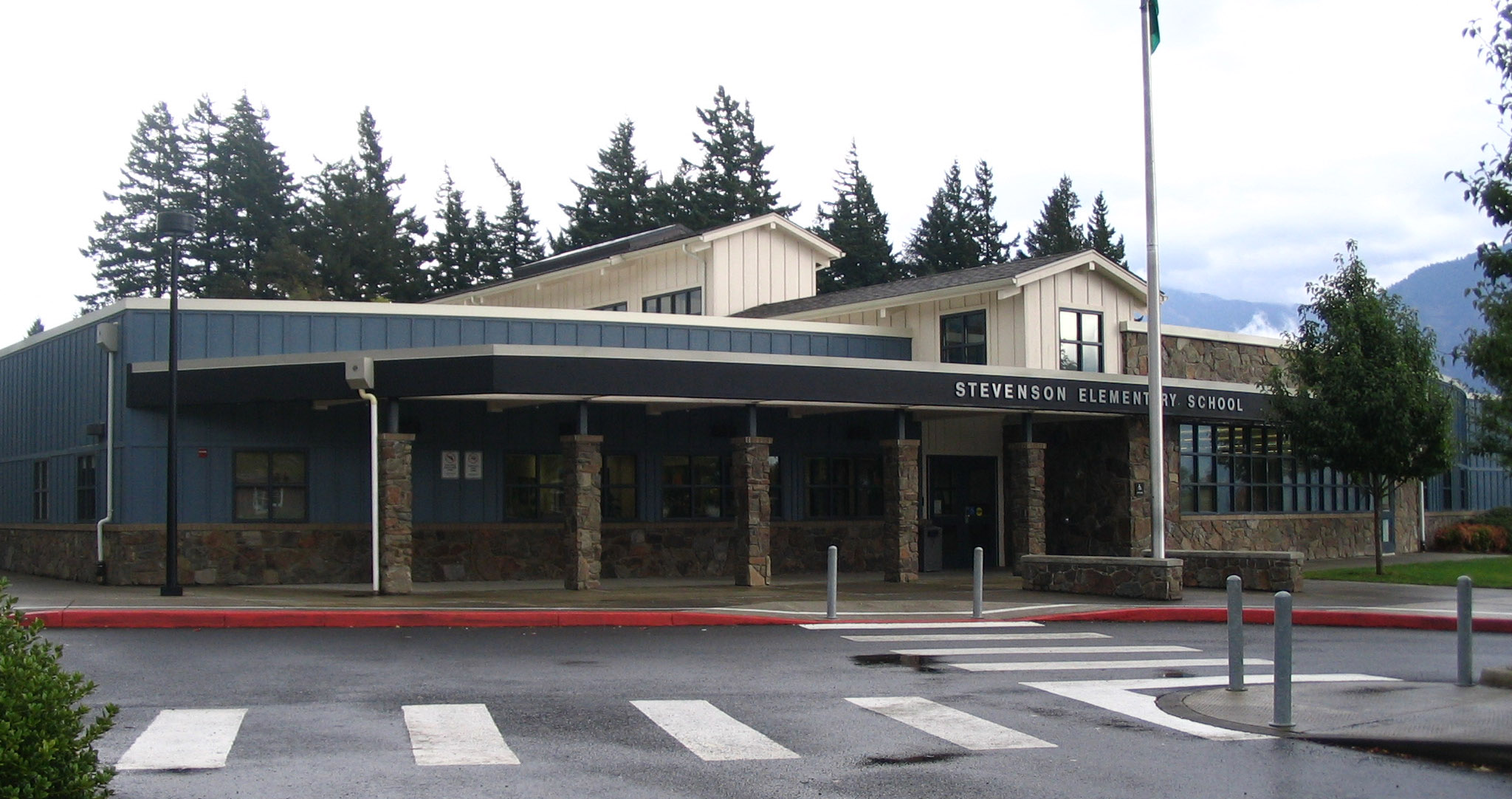
Stevenson Elementary School

Stevenson is served by the Stevenson-Carson School District, which encompasses the entirety of Skamania County. It includes Carson Elementary School in Carson and Stevenson Elementary School in Stevenson. The only middle school in the area is Wind River Middle School, and the only high school is Stevenson High School, both located in Stevenson.

As of the 2022 American Community Survey, 35.8% of people living in Stevenson had a high school diploma or equivalent education. 7.8% had associate's degrees, 12.5% had bachelor's degrees, and 9.4% had graduate or professional degrees.

== Parks and recreation ==
Stevenson is situated within the Columbia River Gorge National Scenic Area, which contains the highland terrain areas of Greenleaf Peak and Table Mountain. Hikers can access the Pacific Crest Trail south of the community.

== Infrastructure ==
=== Transportation ===
State Route 14 runs through Stevenson and continues west to Vancouver and east to Dallesport. It is a two-lane highway with occasional truck climbing lanes. The Bridge of the Gods is southwest of Stevenson and connects the north side of the river to Cascade Locks and Interstate 84.

Stevenson is also served by Skamania County Transit, the county's public transit system, which operates daily bus service to Vancouver, North Bonneville, Bingen, and Cascade Locks. The system is part of the regional Gorge Translink alliance and shares a common annual pass system with other operators in the Columbia River Gorge area.

== Notable residents ==
- Fabio Lanzoni, model, actor, and spokesperson
- Christian Aalvik, businessman and state legislator
- Marie Gluesenkamp Perez, U.S. Representative for Washington's 3rd congressional district since 2023
- Charlie Hales, politician, 52nd mayor of Portland, Oregon
- Dave Hood, actor, host of Real Wheels series
- Darren Morningstar, former NBA basketball player

== See also ==
- Skamania Lodge
- Columbia Gorge Museum
- Bridge of the Gods
