= Wind River Experimental Forest =

Research site in Washington, United States

Coordinates: 45°49′13″N 121°57′7″W

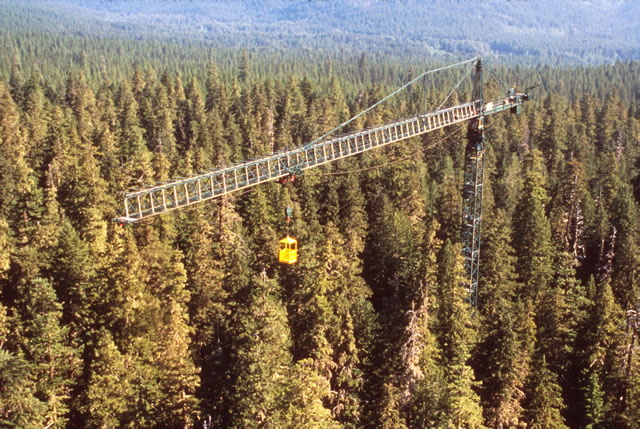
Wind River Canopy Crane

The Wind River Experimental Forest is an ecological and silvicultural research in Stabler, Washington, in the United States. Used as a research site by the U.S. Forest Service beginning in 1908, and functioning as an experimental forest since 1932, it is "known as the cradle of forest research in the Pacific Northwest". The site is probably best known for the Wind River Canopy Crane Research Facility (WRCCRF), a 285-foot (87 m)-high freestanding tower crane which supported an 8-person gondola enabling scientists to view the forest canopy from above. The tallest trees in the forest are about 220 feet (67 m).

Many studies at Wind River continue for decades. This long-term research has resulted in important findings about forest ecology and management.

== Location ==
It is located west of the Cascade Range in the south-central area of the Gifford Pinchot National Forest, north of the Columbia River Gorge National Scenic Area. It is about a 1.5-hour drive east of Vancouver, Washington, in the Mount Adams Ranger District.

== History ==
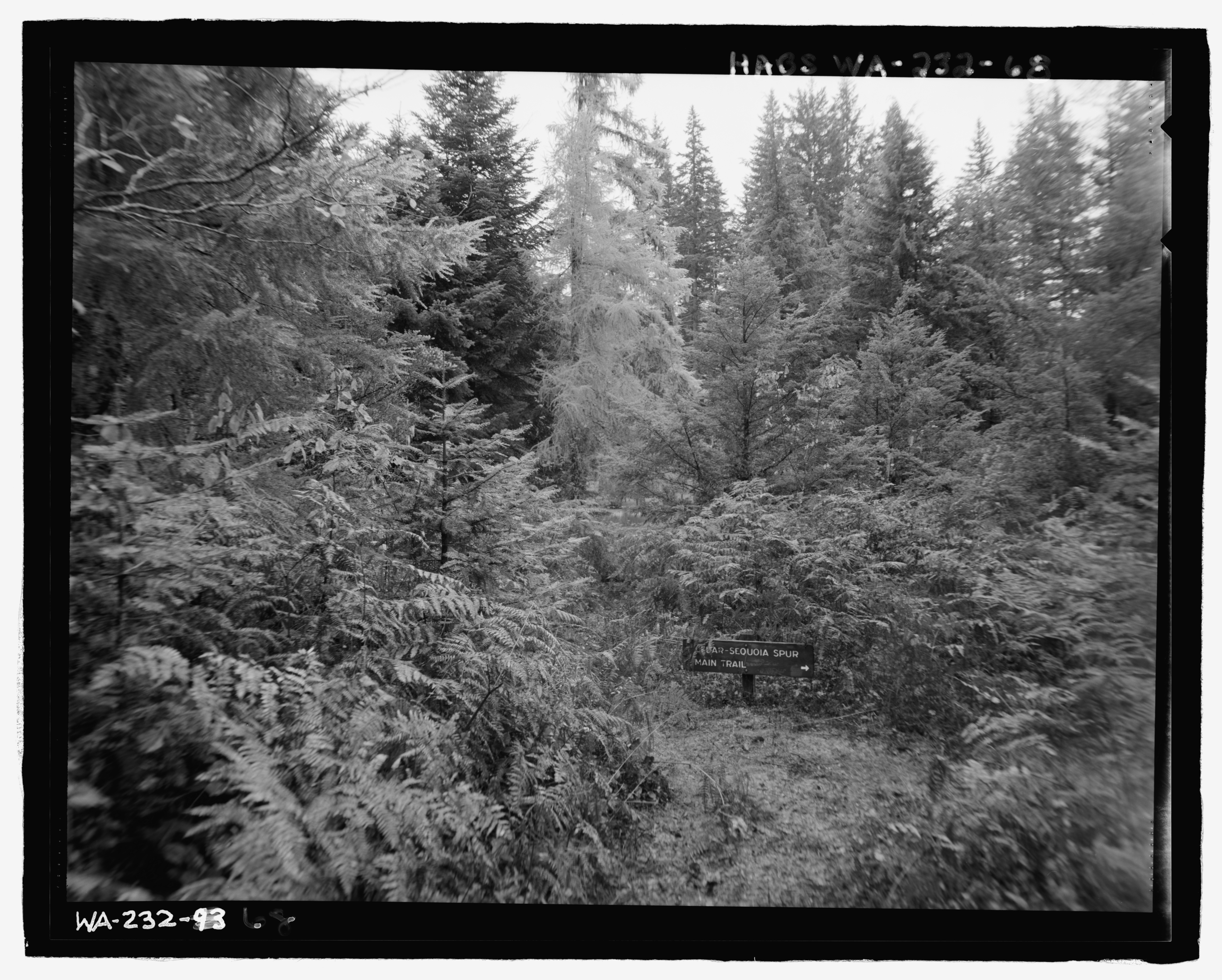
View of trail junction and surrounding trees within Wind River Arboretum

Research at Wind River began with the assignment of Forest Service scientist Thornton T. Munger in 1908 to the new North Pacific District in Portland, Oregon. Munger began studying the Douglas fir trees of the western Cascades, setting up research plots throughout the Wind River area. In 1910, Munger, along with Julius Kummel, established a permanent nursery at Wind River, near the existing Hemlock Ranger Station on the Columbia National Forest (today the Gifford Pinchot National Forest). In 1912, Munger established the Wind River Arboretum to study the sustainability of exotic trees in the Pacific Northwest environment.

The successful research operations already in place at Wind River led to the Forest Service officially designating the site as the Wind River Experiment Station in 1913. The Wind River Experiment Station became the Pacific Northwest Forest and Range Experiment Station in 1924, with operations based in Portland, Oregon and Thornton Munger as director. In 1932, the research area was officially designated as the Wind River Experimental Forest.

== The WRCCRF ==
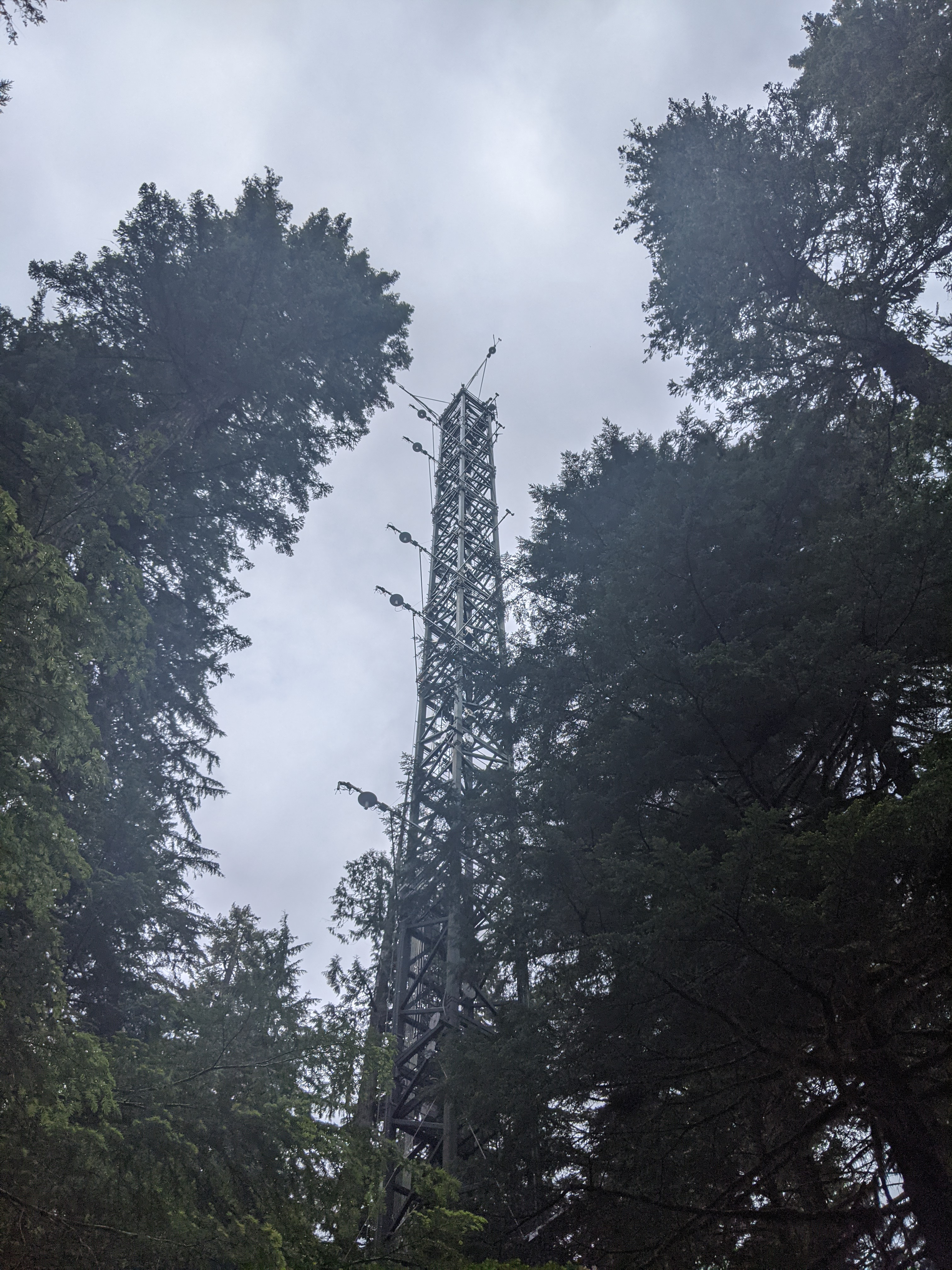
The converted crane as an instrumentation tower, 2021

The WRCCRF was established in 1994 and erected in 1995 as a cooperative scientific and educational venture among the University of Washington (UW) College of Forest Resources, the U.S. Forest Service (USFS) Pacific Northwest Research Station, and the Gifford Pinchot National Forest. The crane is a Liebherr 550 HC freestanding tower crane with a load jib extension purchased from Morrow Crane Company, Inc., of Salem, Oregon.

According to an article by Sandra Hines, "While scientists have studied the tropical rain forest canopy for years with cranes, this is the first extensive study of the temperate forest canopy." UW professor Jerry Franklin (who Hines describes as "the guiding force behind the crane") said that the study demonstrates that temperate conifer forests are better at banking carbon than any other ecosystem in the world, certainly more than tropical forests on a per unit area basis, at least 178 tons per acre (40 kg/m^{2}.) This finding could have significant impact on strategies to fight global warming.

The WRCCRF ceased operation in 2011. It was retrofitted with ecological monitoring sensors as part of the National Ecological Observatory Network.

== Administration ==
It is administered cooperatively by the USFS Pacific Northwest Research Station and Gifford Pinchot National Forest, and is one of ten experimental areas associated with the United States Department of Agriculture's Pacific Northwest Research Station.

The experimental forest has two administrative units: the Trout Creek and Panther Creek divisions. The Trout Creek division has old-growth forests, stands that originated after large wildfires in the first third of the 20th century, and young stands regenerated after clearcuts in the last half of the 20th century. The Panther Creek division has mature stands that grew after a fire in the early 1840s and young stands from more recent clearcuts.
