= Bonneville =

Bonneville may refer to:

== People ==
- Benjamin Bonneville (1796–1878), French-born officer in the United States Army, fur trapper, and explorer in the American West
- Hugh Bonneville (born 1963), English actor
- Nicholas Bonneville (1760–1828), French writer
- Ray Bonneville (born 1948), Canadian-born American musician
- Gerard Bonneville, a fictional character in Book of Dust

== Places ==
=== Belgium ===
- Bonneville, Namur, former municipality in the province Namur
  - Bonneville Castle, a stately home in Bonneville

=== France ===
- Arrondissement of Bonneville, in the Haute-Savoie department
  - Bonneville, Haute-Savoie, in the Haute-Savoie department
    - Bonneville station, a railway station in Bonneville
- La Bonneville, in the Manche department
- Bonneville, Charente, in the Charente department
- Bonneville, Somme, in the Somme department
- Bonneville-Aptot, in the Eure department
- Bonneville-et-Saint-Avit-de-Fumadières, in the Dordogne department
- La Bonneville-sur-Iton, in the Eure department
- Bonneville-la-Louvet, in the Calvados department
- Bonneville-sur-Touques, in the Calvados department

=== United States ===
==== Pacific Northwest region ====
- Bonneville, Oregon, a city
  - Bonneville Dam, on the Columbia River between Washington and Oregon
  - Lake Bonneville (Oregon), the reservoir impounded by the Bonneville Dam
  - North Bonneville, Washington, a city adjacent to Bonneville, Oregon
- Bonneville County, in Southeastern Idaho
  - Bonneville High School (Idaho Falls, Idaho)
  - Bonneville Hotel, in Idaho Falls
- Camp Bonneville, a former United States Army post near Vancouver, Washington

==== Utah ====
- Lake Bonneville, a prehistoric pluvial lake that covered much of North America's Great Basin region
  - Bonneville Salt Flats, an ancient lake bed of Lake Bonneville in Utah
  - Bonneville Speedway, a motor sports area of the Salt Flats
- Bonneville High School (Washington Terrace, Utah)

==== Elsewhere ====
- Bonneville House, a historic house in Fort Smith, Arkansas
- Bonneville National Forest, a former national forest in Wyoming
- Cote Bonneville, a historic building in Cincinnati, Ohio
- Mount Bonneville, located in the Wind River Range in Wyoming
- Bonneville, California, former name of Boonville, California

=== Extraterrestrial ===
- Bonneville (crater), a Martian crater visited by the Mars Exploration Rover in 2004

== Organisms ==
- Bonneville cisco, a species of cisco
- Bonneville cutthroat trout, a subspecies of cutthroat trout
- Bonneville shootingstar, a species of flowering perennial plant in the primrose family
- Bonneville whitefish, a salmonid fish
- Bonneville skipper, a subspecies of Ochlodes sylvanoides, a butterfly of the family Hesperiidae

== Vehicles ==
- Triumph Bonneville, a motorcycle
- Pontiac Bonneville, a series of cars produced from 1958 to 2005
- Pontiac Bonneville Special, a 1956 concept car

== Other uses ==
- Bonneville (film), a 2006 drama film
- Bonneville Expedition of 1832, an expedition of Oregon Country
- Bonneville Expedition of 1857, American military operation during the Apache Wars
- Bonneville International, a media and broadcasting company

== See also ==
- Bonnyville, Alberta, Canada, a town
- Bonnieville, Kentucky, United States, an unincorporated community
- Bonneville Power Administration, an American federal agency in the Pacific Northwest
