= Bonneville Hotel =

- U.S. National Register of Historic Places
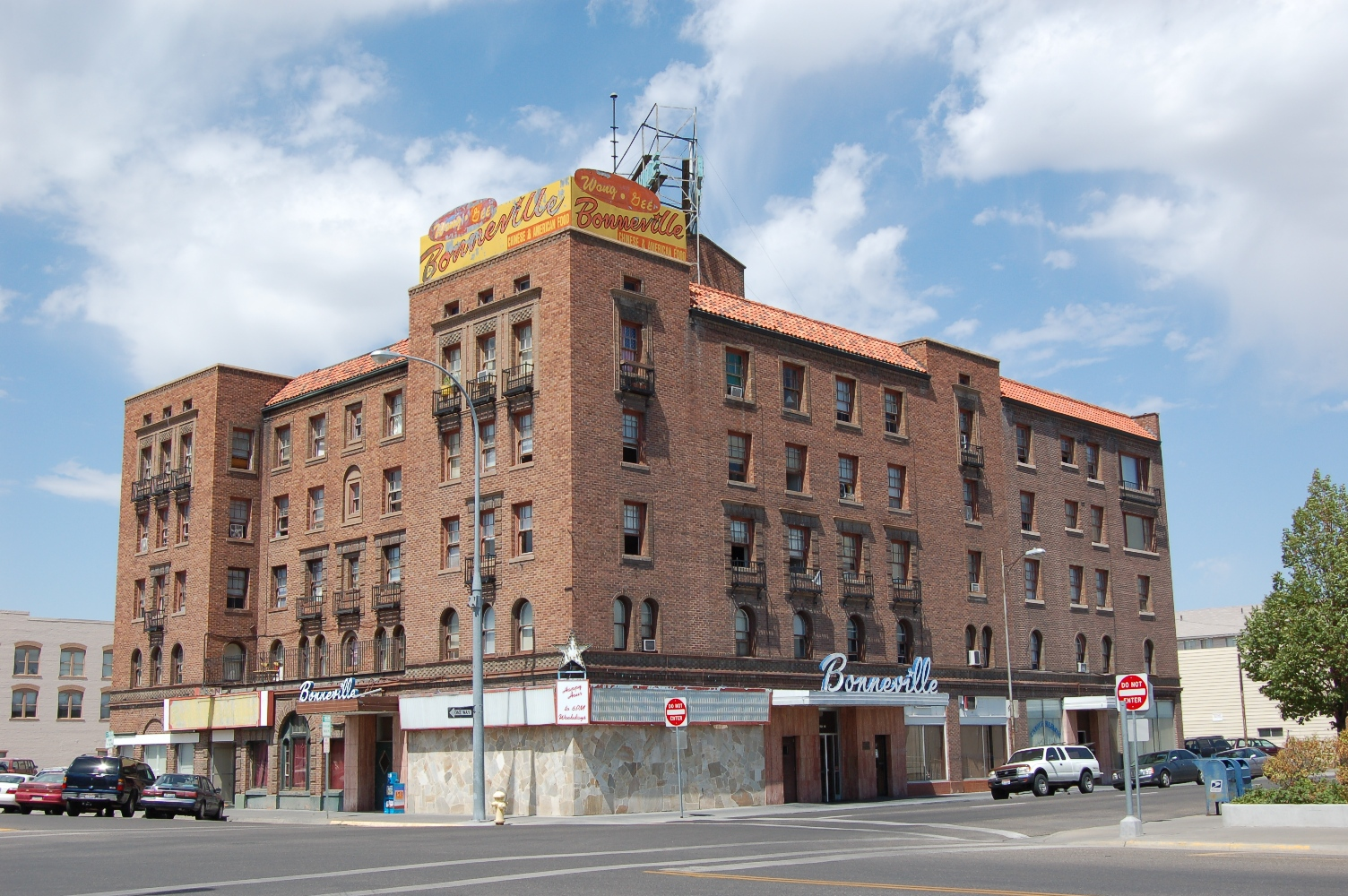

- Location within Idaho Location within the United States
- Interactive map showing the location of Bonneville Hotel
- Location: 400 Blk W. C St., Idaho Falls, Idaho
- Coordinates: 43°29′41″N 112°2′19″W
- Area: less than one acre
- Built: 1927
- Architectural style: Spanish Colonial Revival
- MPS: Idaho Falls Downtown MRA
- NRHP reference No.: 84001032
- Added to NRHP: August 30, 1984

The Bonneville Hotel, on the 400 block of W. C St. in Idaho Falls in Bonneville County, Idaho, was built in 1927. It was listed on the National Register of Historic Places in 1984.

It is a five-story, brick-veneered hotel which was built in 1927 and was remodeled in 1951. The brick is pale to dark burnt red in shade, and is laid in common bond.
