= Bonneville, Oregon =

Unincorporated community in the state of Oregon, United States

- Unincorporated community
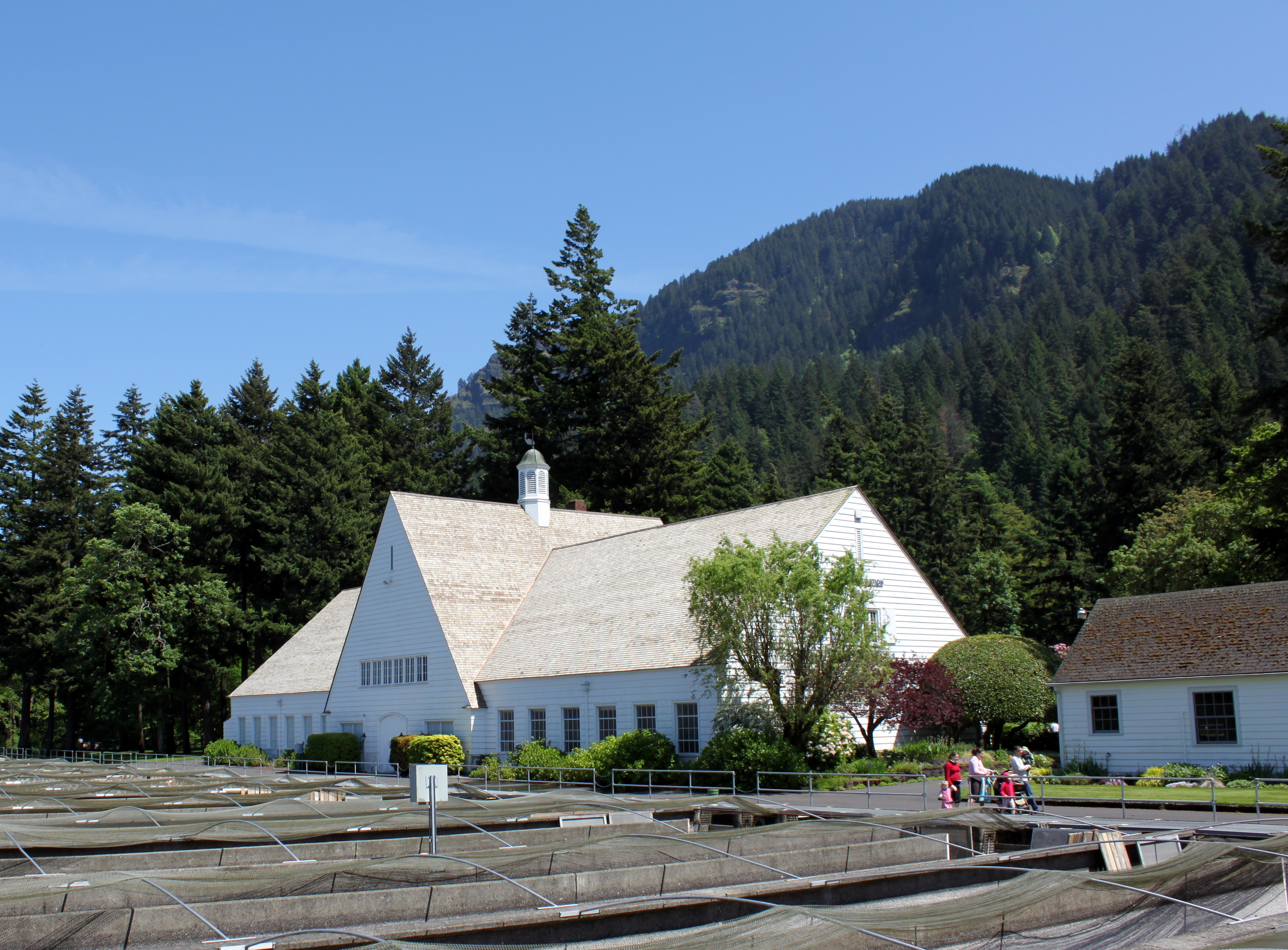
- Historic incubation building at the Bonneville Hatchery

- Location within Oregon Location within the United States
- Coordinates: 45°38′09″N 121°57′07″W
- Country: United States
- State: Oregon
- County: Multnomah
- Elevation: 52 ft (16 m)
- Time zone: UTC-8 (Pacific (PST))
  - Summer (DST): UTC-7 (PDT)
- ZIP code: 97014
- Area codes: 458 and 541
- GNIS feature ID: 1138422

Bonneville is an unincorporated community in Multnomah County, Oregon, United States, on Interstate 84 and the Columbia River. Bonneville is best known as the site of Bonneville Dam. North Bonneville, Washington is across the river.

For decades before the dam was built, Bonneville was popular as a picnic spot for people living along the Columbia River between Portland and The Dalles, and the railroad company maintained an "eating house" for travelers there. Bonneville railroad station was named for explorer Benjamin Bonneville. The name "Bonneville" did not appear on maps until the late 1880s. Bonneville post office was established in 1900.

== Climate ==
Bonneville has a warm-summer Mediterranean climate (Köppen Csb).

Climate data for Bonneville Dam (1991–2020 normals, extremes 1937–present)
Month	Jan	Feb	Mar	Apr	May	Jun	Jul	Aug	Sep	Oct	Nov	Dec	Year
Record high °F (°C)	64 (18)	68 (20)	75 (24)	88 (31)	98 (37)	111 (44)	107 (42)	107 (42)	100 (38)	86 (30)	71 (22)	65 (18)	107 (42)
Mean maximum °F (°C)	56.6 (13.7)	57.9 (14.4)	67.5 (19.7)	77.2 (25.1)	85.8 (29.9)	90.8 (32.7)	96.5 (35.8)	96.2 (35.7)	90.8 (32.7)	77.0 (25.0)	62.8 (17.1)	56.7 (13.7)	100.2 (37.9)
Mean daily maximum °F (°C)	42.7 (5.9)	47.2 (8.4)	53.3 (11.8)	59.4 (15.2)	66.5 (19.2)	71.6 (22.0)	79.0 (26.1)	79.7 (26.5)	74.2 (23.4)	62.4 (16.9)	50.1 (10.1)	42.4 (5.8)	60.7 (15.9)
Daily mean °F (°C)	38.5 (3.6)	41.3 (5.2)	45.6 (7.6)	50.8 (10.4)	57.0 (13.9)	61.9 (16.6)	68.1 (20.1)	68.6 (20.3)	63.6 (17.6)	54.5 (12.5)	45.0 (7.2)	38.5 (3.6)	52.8 (11.6)
Mean daily minimum °F (°C)	34.3 (1.3)	35.5 (1.9)	38.0 (3.3)	42.2 (5.7)	47.6 (8.7)	52.3 (11.3)	57.1 (13.9)	57.5 (14.2)	53.1 (11.7)	46.6 (8.1)	39.8 (4.3)	34.7 (1.5)	44.9 (7.2)
Mean minimum °F (°C)	24.6 (−4.1)	26.8 (−2.9)	30.7 (−0.7)	35.0 (1.7)	39.2 (4.0)	45.4 (7.4)	49.9 (9.9)	50.5 (10.3)	45.7 (7.6)	38.1 (3.4)	30.7 (−0.7)	25.5 (−3.6)	20.3 (−6.5)
Record low °F (°C)	2 (−17)	7 (−14)	20 (−7)	28 (−2)	31 (−1)	37 (3)	43 (6)	42 (6)	34 (1)	29 (−2)	9 (−13)	0 (−18)	0 (−18)
Average precipitation inches (mm)	11.31 (287)	8.67 (220)	9.13 (232)	6.47 (164)	4.08 (104)	3.21 (82)	0.60 (15)	0.90 (23)	2.62 (67)	7.30 (185)	12.48 (317)	13.45 (342)	80.22 (2,038)
Average snowfall inches (cm)	3.5 (8.9)	3.4 (8.6)	0.3 (0.76)	0.0 (0.0)	0.0 (0.0)	0.0 (0.0)	0.0 (0.0)	0.0 (0.0)	0.0 (0.0)	0.0 (0.0)	0.2 (0.51)	2.9 (7.4)	10.3 (26)
Average precipitation days (≥ 0.01 in)	21.6	18.2	20.2	18.8	14.5	11.2	4.2	3.7	7.8	15.4	21.1	22.1	178.8
Average snowy days (≥ 0.1 in)	1.6	1.2	0.2	0.0	0.0	0.0	0.0	0.0	0.0	0.0	0.1	1.4	4.5
Source: NOAA
