= Bonneville Castle =

Castle in Andenne, Belgium

Coordinates: 50.470°N 5.034°E

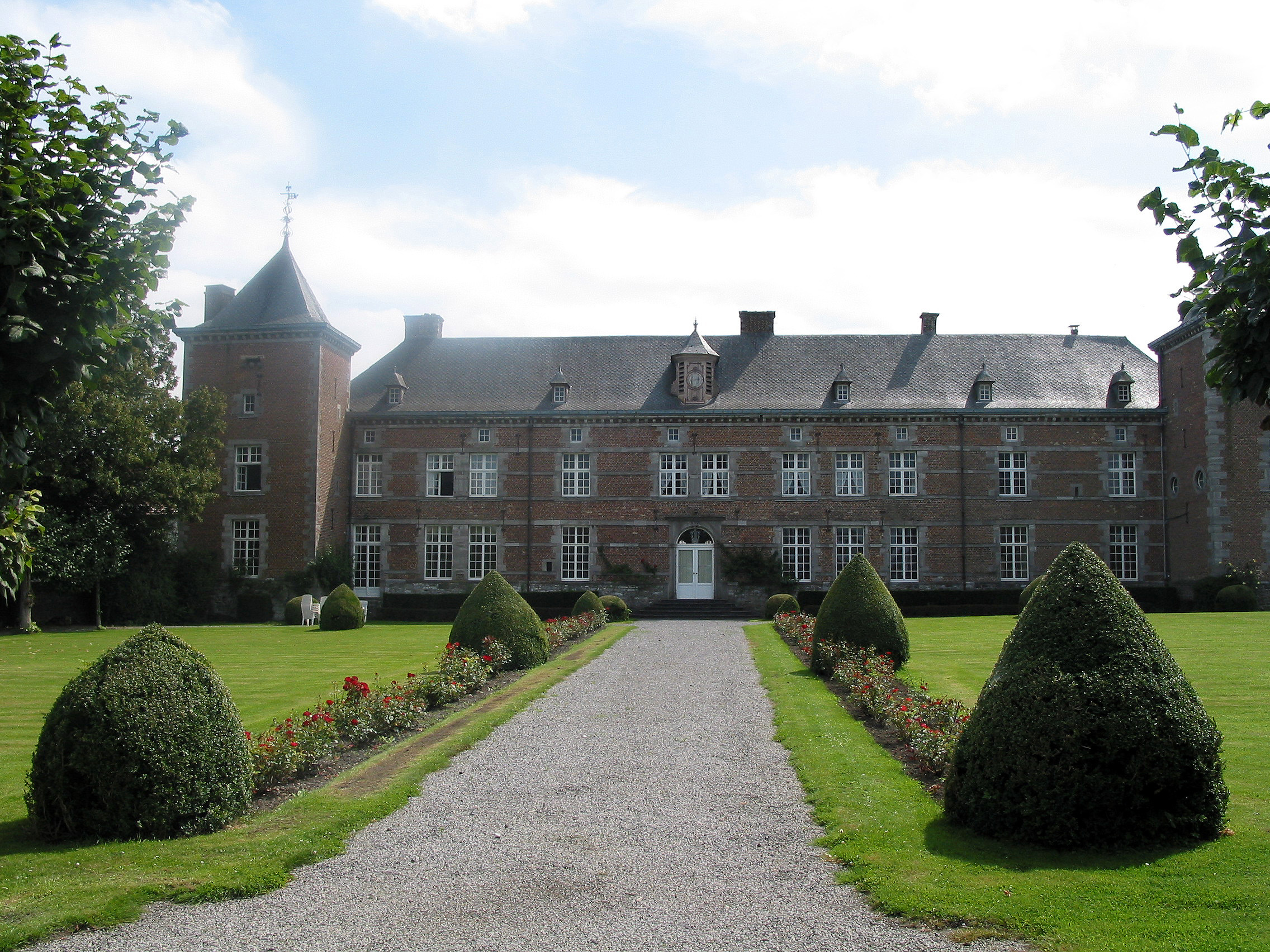

Bonneville Castle (French: Château de Bonneville) is a stately home in Bonneville in the municipality of Andenne, province of Namur, Wallonia, Belgium.

Originally a farmhouse with a 15th-century donjon, it was acquired in 1617 by Jacques de Zualart, who began an extensive rebuilding, the continuance of which ruined his son, Tilmant de Zualart. In about 1690 the château became the property of his principal creditor, Jean-Hubert de Tignée, whose descendants still own it.

The present building is in the Mosan style of the 17th century, with 18th century additions and French gardens.

== See also ==
- List of castles in Belgium
