= Bonneville, Namur =

Bonneville Bounveye (Walloon)
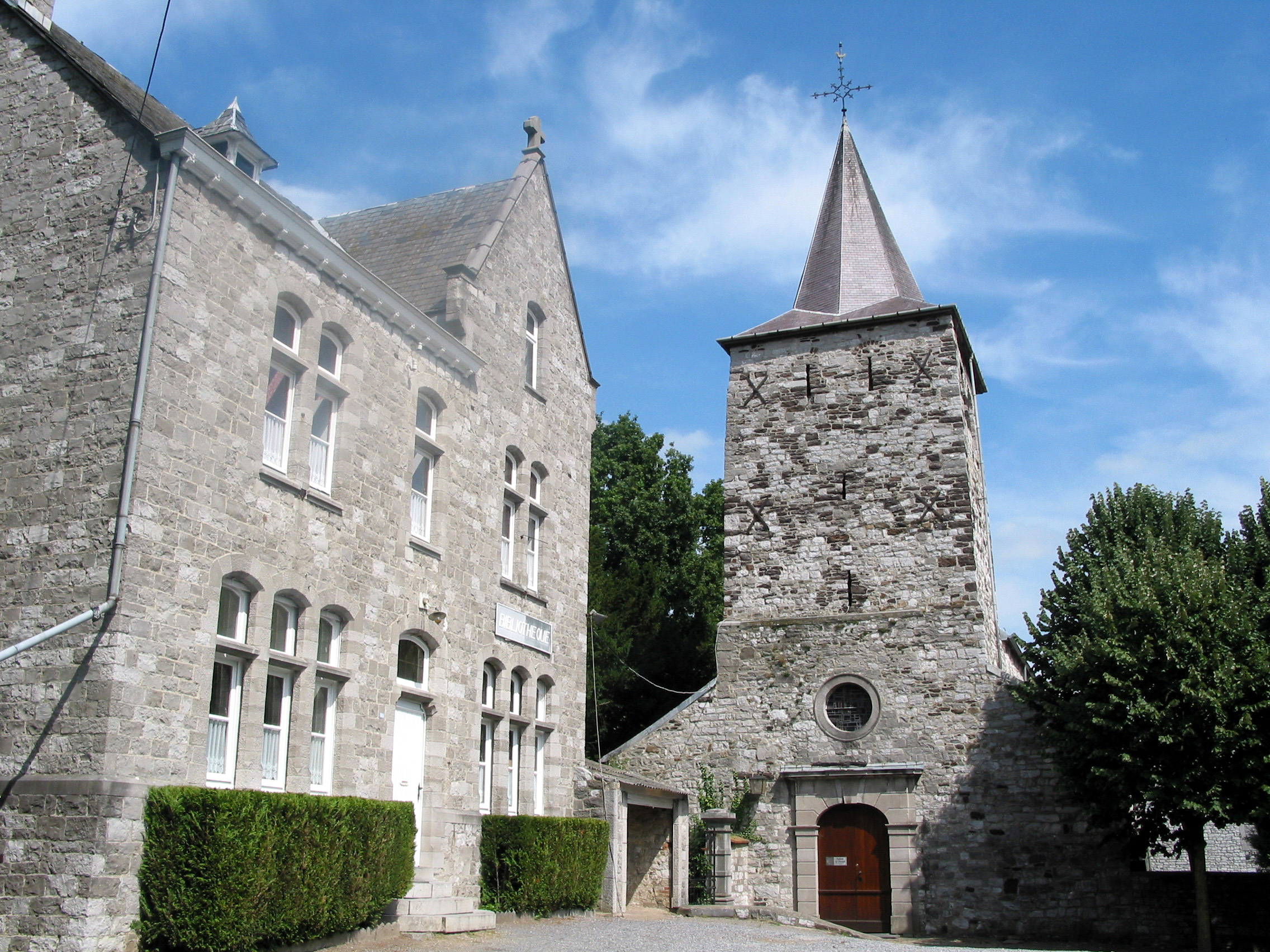
- Bonneville

- Location within Belgium Location within Europe
- Coordinates: 50°28′12″N 05°01′12″E
- Country: Belgium
- Region: Wallonia
- Province: Namur
- Municipality: Andenne

Bonneville (French pronunciation: [bɔnvil]; Walloon: Bounveye) is a village of Wallonia and a district of the municipality of Andenne, located in the province of Namur, Belgium.

The village church, dedicated to Saint Fermin, is a Romanesque building from the 11th century. Bonneville Castle is located in the village.
