= Bonneville Dam =

Dam on the Columbia River, United States

Bonneville Locks and Dam
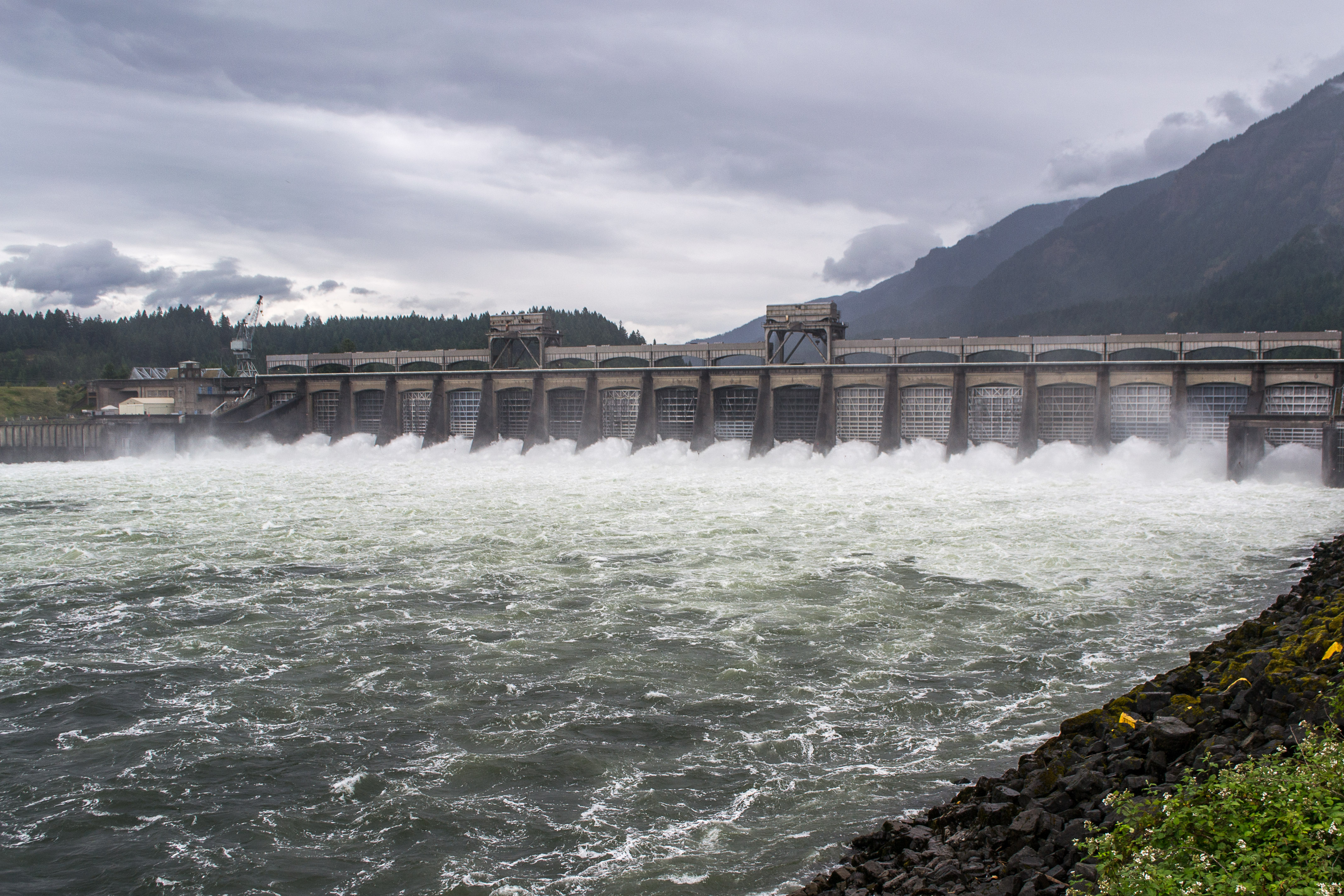
- Spillway structure
- Interactive map of Bonneville Locks and Dam
- Location: Columbia River Gorge National Scenic Area, Multnomah County, Oregon / Skamania County, Washington, U.S.
- Coordinates: 45°38′39″N 121°56′26″W
- Construction began: 1934 (First Powerhouse); 1974 (Second Powerhouse)
- Opening date: 1937 (First Powerhouse); 1981 (Second Powerhouse)
- Construction cost: $88.4 million (First Powerhouse, Spillway, Lock and Fish structures) $664 million (Second Powerhouse)
- Owners: US Army Corps of Engineers (Operator); Bonneville Power Administration (Marketer)

Dam and spillways
- Type of dam: Concrete gravity, run-of-the-river
- Impounds: Columbia River
- Height: 171 ft (52 m)
- Length: 2,690 ft (820 m)
- Width (base): 132 ft (40 m) (Spillway)
- Spillway type: Service, gate-controlled

Reservoir
- Creates: Lake Bonneville
- Total capacity: 537,000 acre⋅ft (0.662 km^{3})
- Catchment area: 240,000 mi^{2} (620,000 km^{2})

Power Station
- Turbines: 20 and unit 0
- Installed capacity: 1242 MW
- Annual generation: 4,466 GWh (2009)
- Bonneville Dam Historic District
- U.S. National Register of Historic Places
- U.S. National Historic Landmark District
- Location: Bonneville, Oregon
- Built: 1934–1943
- Architect: Claussen and Claussen
- Architectural style: Colonial Revival
- NRHP reference No.: 86000727 (original); 86003598 (increase)

Significant dates
- Added to NRHP: April 9, 1986
- Boundary increase: March 26, 1987
- Designated NHLD: June 30, 1987

Bonneville Lock and Dam /ˈbɒnəvɪl/ consists of several run-of-the-river dam structures that together complete a span of the Columbia River between the U.S. states of Oregon and Washington at River Mile 146.1. The dam is located 40 miles (64 km) east of Portland, Oregon, in the Columbia River Gorge. The primary functions of Bonneville Lock and Dam are electrical power generation and river navigation. The dam was built and is managed by the United States Army Corps of Engineers. At the time of its construction in the 1930s it was the largest water impoundment project of its type in the nation, able to withstand flooding on an unprecedented scale. Electrical power generated at Bonneville is distributed by the Bonneville Power Administration. Bonneville Dam was named after an adjacent railway station, which in turn was named for United States Army Captain Benjamin Bonneville, an early explorer and fur trader, who never came close to the site. The Bonneville Dam Historic District was designated a National Historic Landmark District in 1987.

== History ==
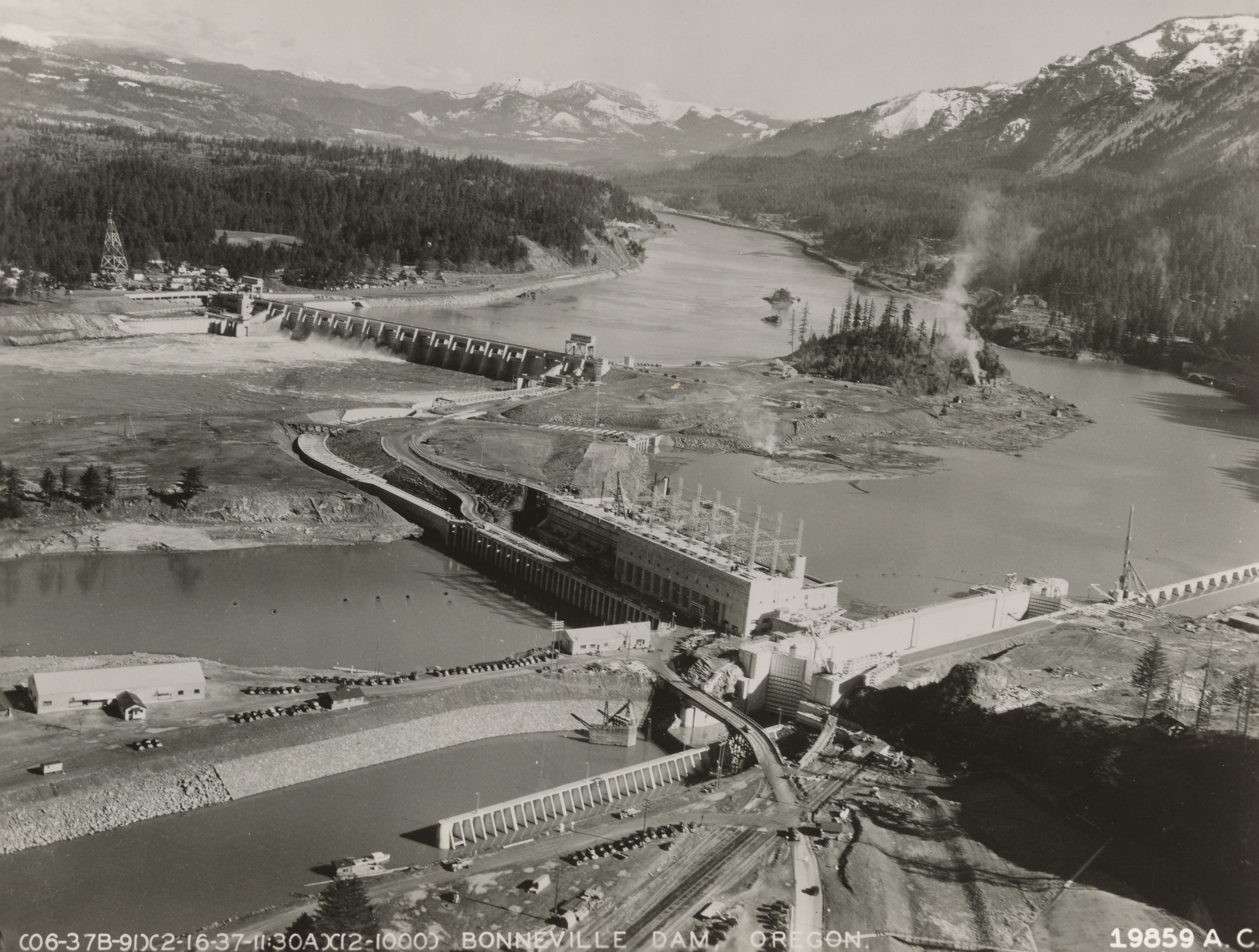
Bonneville Lock & Dam, 1937

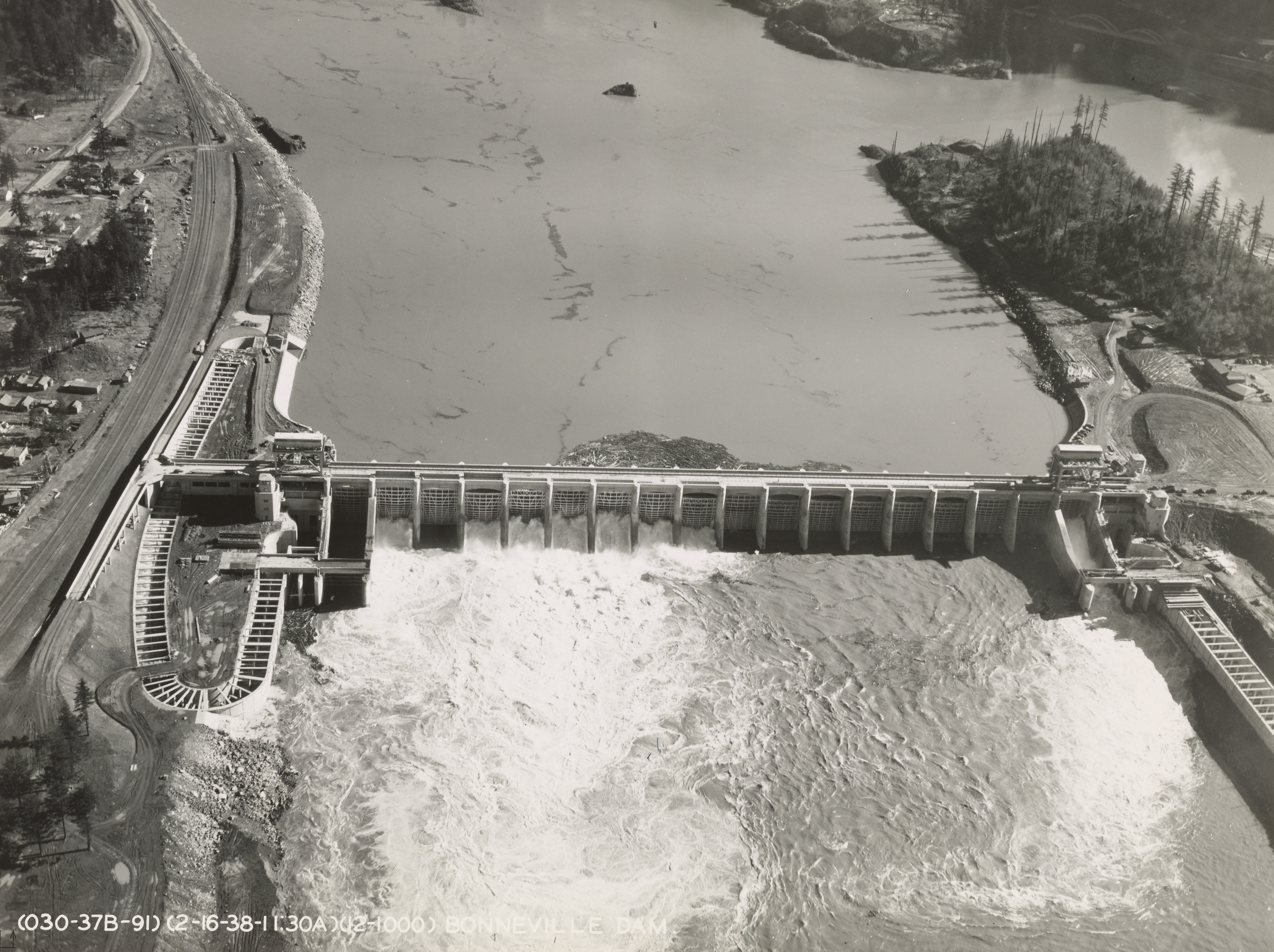
Bonneville Dam, 1938

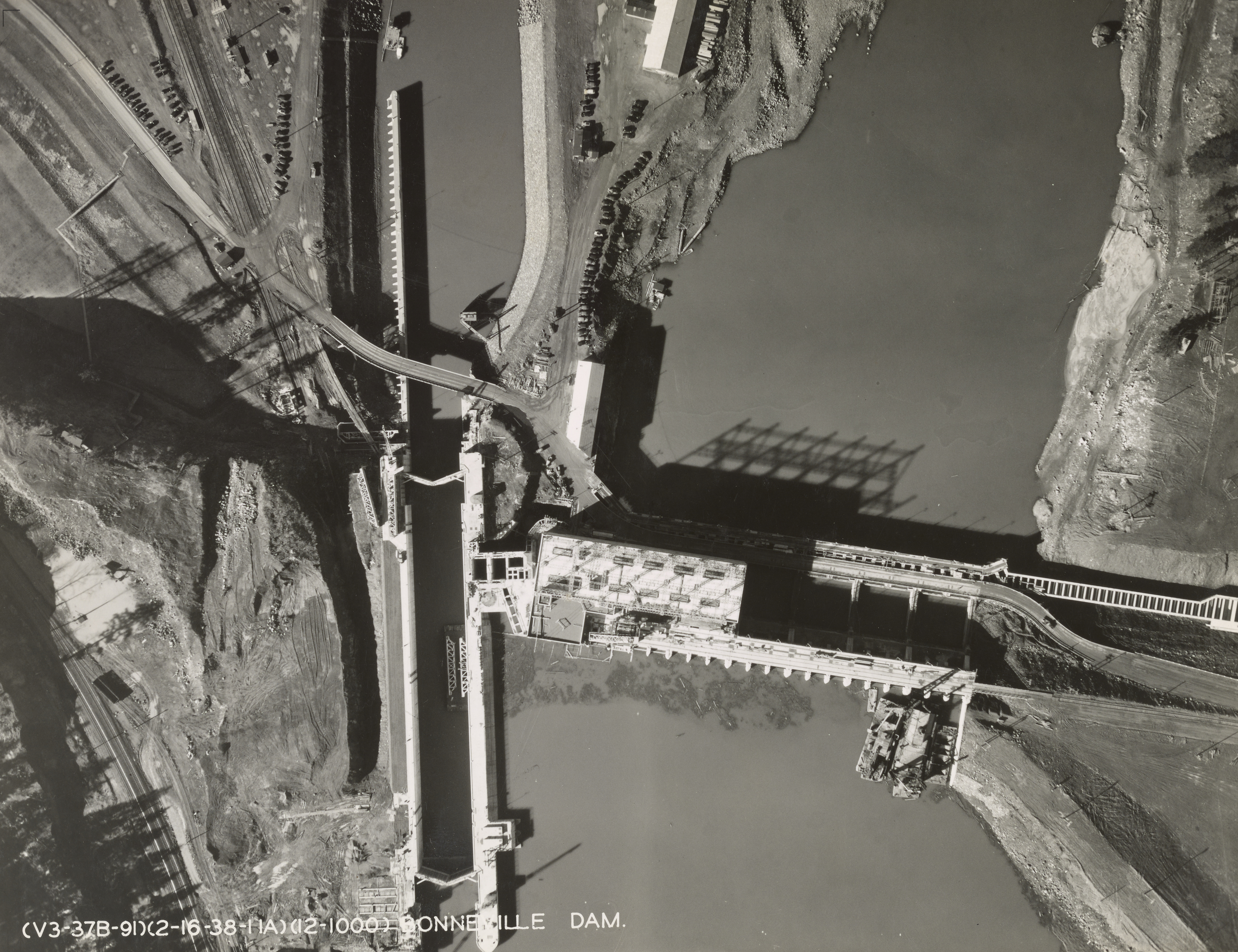
Bonneville Lock, 1938

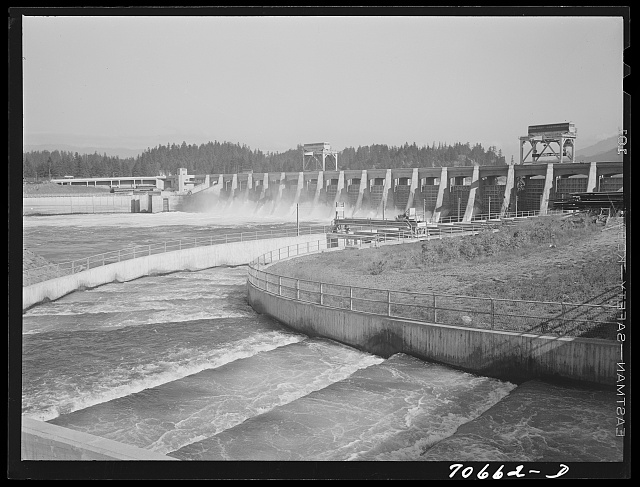
Fish ladders and Bonneville Dam

In 1896, prior to this damming of the river, the Cascade Locks and Canal were constructed, allowing ships to pass the Cascades Rapids, located several miles upstream of Bonneville.

Prior to the New Deal, development of the Columbia River to provide flood control, hydroelectricity, navigation, and irrigation was deemed to be important. In 1929, the US Army Corps of Engineers published the Columbia River 308 Report that recommended ten dams on the river, but no action was taken until the Franklin D. Roosevelt administration and the New Deal. During this period, America was in the Great Depression, and the dam's construction provided jobs and other economic benefits to the Pacific Northwest. Inexpensive hydroelectricity gave rise to a strong aluminum industry in the area (which has totally shut down since then). With funding from the Public Works Administration in 1934, two of the larger projects were started, the Grand Coulee Dam and the Bonneville Dam. Working in non-stop eight-hour shifts, 3,000 laborers from the relief or welfare rolls were paid 50 cents an hour for the work on the dam and raising local roads for the reservoir.

To create the Bonneville Locks and Dam, the Army Corps of Engineers first built one of the largest scale models in history of the proposed dam, the section of river on which it was to be located, and its various components to aid in the study of the construction. First a new lock and a powerhouse were constructed on the south (Oregon) side of Bradford Island, and a spillway on the north (Washington) side. Cofferdams were built to block half of the river and clear a construction site where the foundation could be reached. These projects, part of the Bonneville Dam, were completed in 1937.

Both the cascades and the old lock structure were submerged by the Bonneville Reservoir, also known as Lake Bonneville, the reservoir that formed behind the dam. The original navigation lock at Bonneville opened in 1938 and was, at that time, the highest single-lift lock in the world, with a vertical lift of 60 feet. Although the dam began to produce hydroelectricity in 1937, commercial electricity began its transfer from the dam in 1938.

A second powerhouse and dam structure were started in 1974 and completed in 1981. The second powerhouse was built by widening the river channel on the Washington side, creating Cascades Island between the new powerhouse and the original spillway. The combined rated capacity electrical output of the two power houses at Bonneville is now 1.2 gigawatts.

Despite its world record size in 1938, Bonneville Lock became the smallest of eight locks, including seven built subsequently at different locations upstream on the Columbia and Snake rivers. Eventually a new lock was needed at Bonneville; this new structure was built on the Oregon shore, opening to ship and barge traffic in 1993. The old lock is still present, but it is no longer used.

The largest fish hatchery in Oregon, called Bonneville Fish Hatchery, is located next to Bonneville Dam. It is a tourist destination that is often connected to Bonneville Dam tourism.

== Dimensions and statistics ==
- Owner: U.S. Army Corps of Engineers, Portland District
- Location: On Columbia River about 40 miles upstream from Portland, Oregon
- First Powerhouse – Constructed in 1933–37; Dam 313 m (1,027 ft) long x 77 feet (23 m) high forebay; 10 generators with a nominal total output capacity of 526.7 MW; Overload capacity 577 MW.
- Spillway – Constructed 1933–37; 18 gates over a length of 442 m (1,450 ft); maintains the reservoir (upriver) usually 18 m (59 ft) above the river on the downstream side;
- Second Powerhouse – Constructed 1974–82; Dam 300.5 m (986 ft) long x 77 feet (23 m) high forebay; 8 generators (plus two at fish ladders) with a nominal total generating capacity of 558.2 MW; Overload capacity 612 MW.
- Bonneville Lock – Constructed from 1987 to 1993 at a cost of $341 million; 26 m (85 ft) wide, 206 m (676 ft) long; transit time is approx. 30 minutes. Replaced earlier smaller lock built 1938.
- Lake Bonneville – 77 km (48 mi) long reservoir on the Columbia River created by Bonneville Dam; part of the Columbia-Snake Inland Waterway.

It was declared a National Historic Landmark in 1987.

- both powerhouses - output capacity: 1.2 GW

== Environmental and social implications ==
The Bonneville Dam blocked the migration of white sturgeon to their upstream spawning areas. Sturgeon still spawn in the area below the dam, and the lower Columbia River supports a healthy sturgeon population. Small, very depressed populations of white sturgeon persist in the various reservoirs upstream.

The dam features fish ladders to help native salmon and steelhead get past the dam on their journey upstream to spawn. The large concentrations of fish swimming upstream serve as a tourist attraction during the spawning season. California sea lions are also attracted to the large number of fish, and are often seen around the base of the dam during the spawning season. By 2006, the growing number of sea lions and their impact on the salmon population had become worrisome to the Army Corps of Engineers and environmentalists. Historically, pinnipeds such as sea lions and seals have hunted salmon in the Columbia River as far as The Dalles and Celilo Falls, 60 miles (97 km) farther upstream from Bonneville, as remarked upon by people such as George Simpson in 1841.

Looking down past the massive white & blue hydroelectric turbines within the Bonneville Dam (2024) - listed on the National Register of Historic Places in 1986.

== Electricity controversy ==
Creating electricity was a sensitive issue at the time of the Bonneville Dam's construction, which was funded with federal dollars. The Franklin D. Roosevelt administration wanted the electricity produced to be a public source of power and prevent energy monopolies. Advocates for private sale of the electricity were opposed to this, and they did not want the government to interfere. In 1937, the Bonneville Project Act was signed by Roosevelt, giving the dam's power over to the public and creating the Bonneville Power Administration (BPA). A rate of $17.50 per kilowatt-year (about 0.2 cents/kWh) was maintained by the BPA for the next 28 years.

Power production is the primary function of the Bonneville Dam. The two Bonneville powerhouses generate about 5 billion kWh of electricity each year. The Bonneville Dam supplies nearly 500,000 homes with electricity, assuming each household consumes 10,000 kWh of electricity per year. In 1998, its generation costs were about 1.2 cents/kWh, which was much higher than historic costs mainly because the Bonneville Power Administration (BPA) was still paying off the second powerhouse which was built in 1982. Consumers were charged 2.3 cents/kWh to account for transmission and other costs.

== Gallery ==
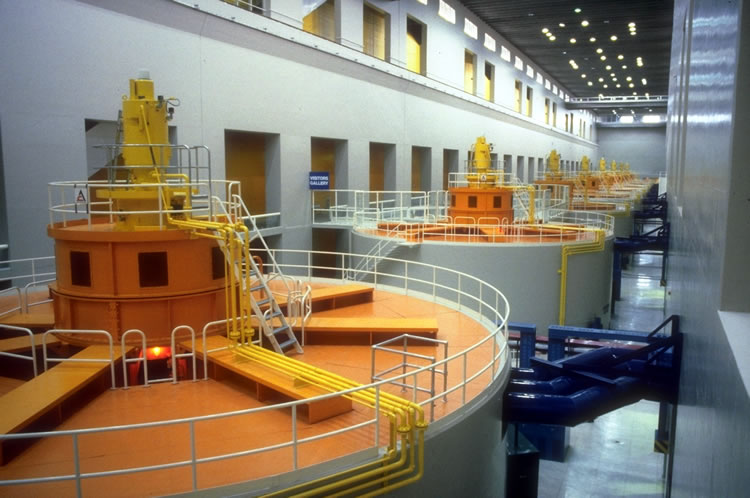
Generators inside the second powerhouse

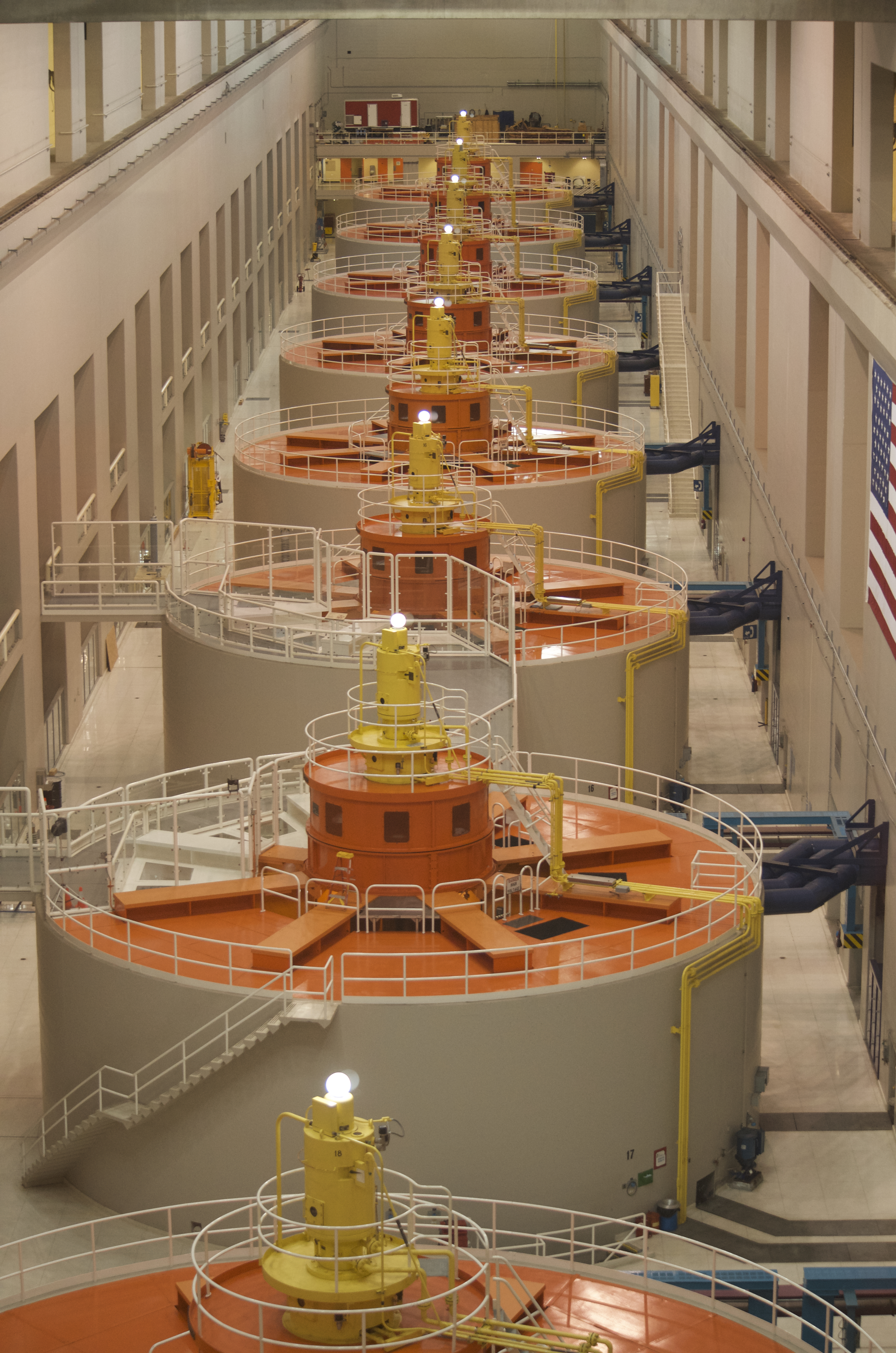
View inside of powerhouse two of Bonneville Dam

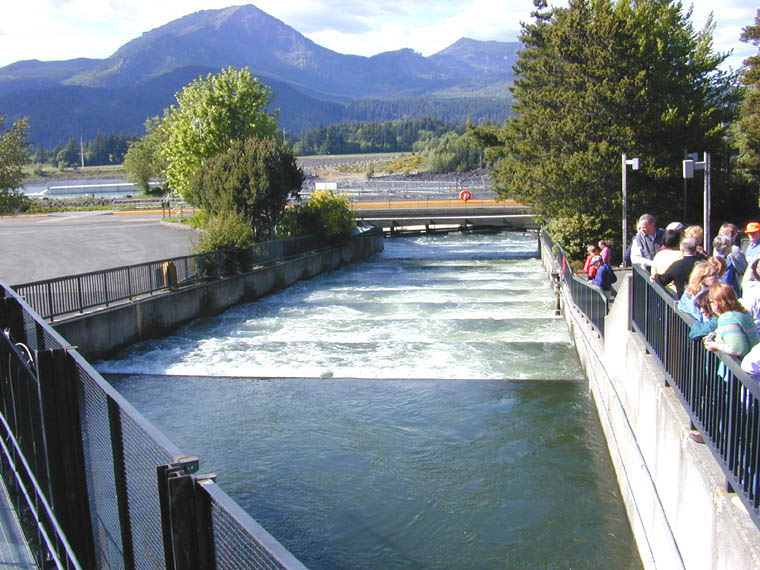
Fish ladder at Bonneville Dam

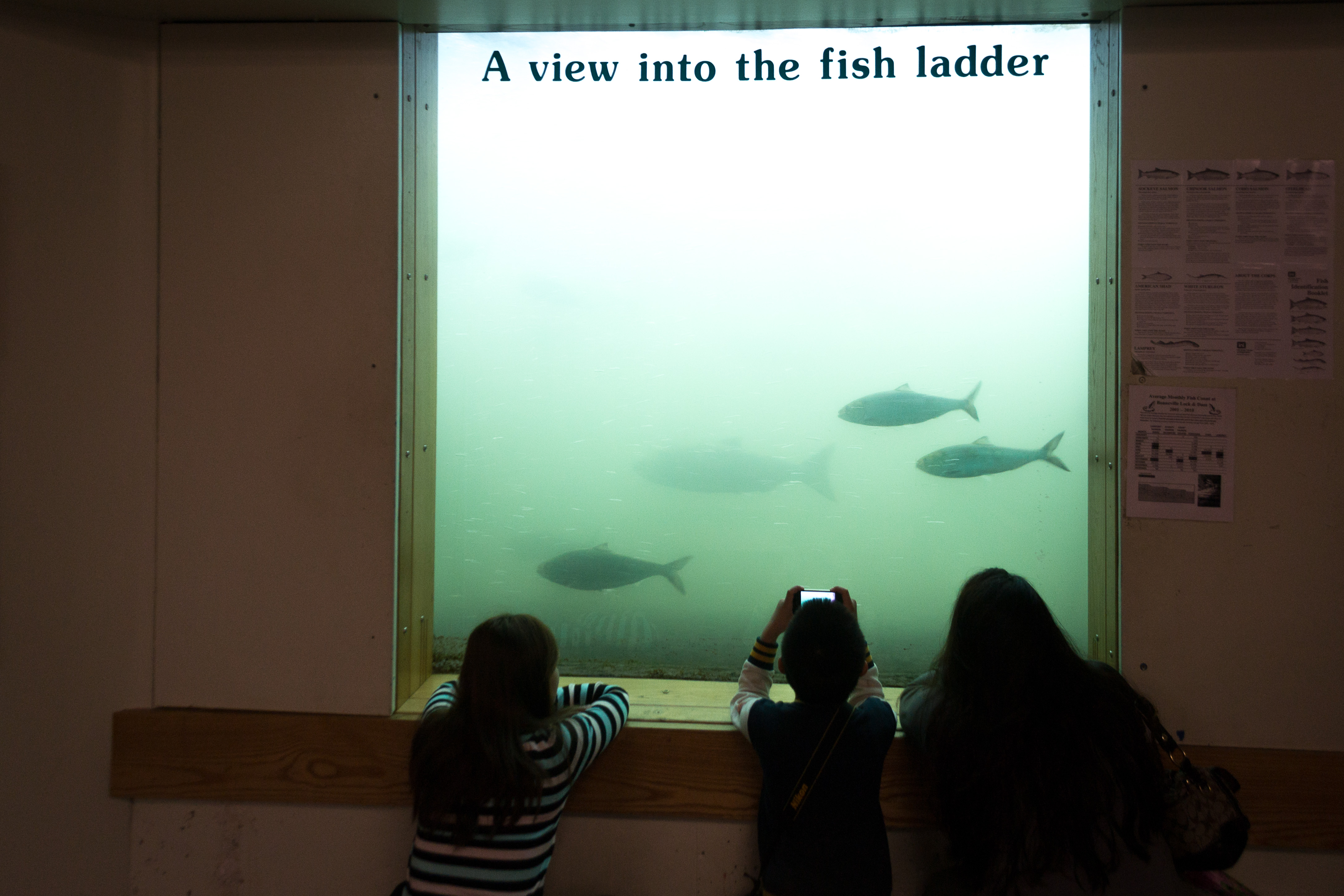
Children watch fish through a viewing window

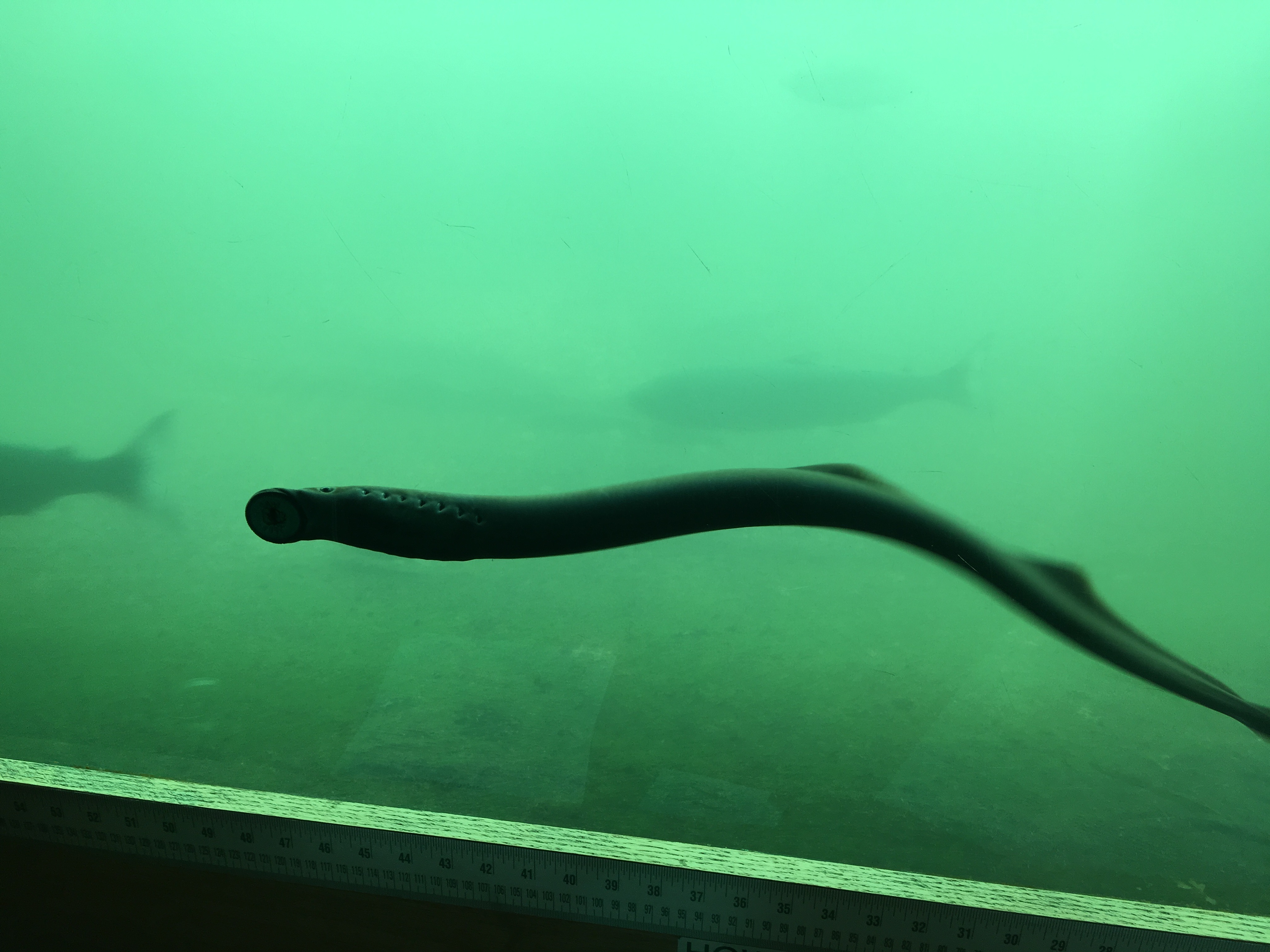
Pacific lamprey attached to glass

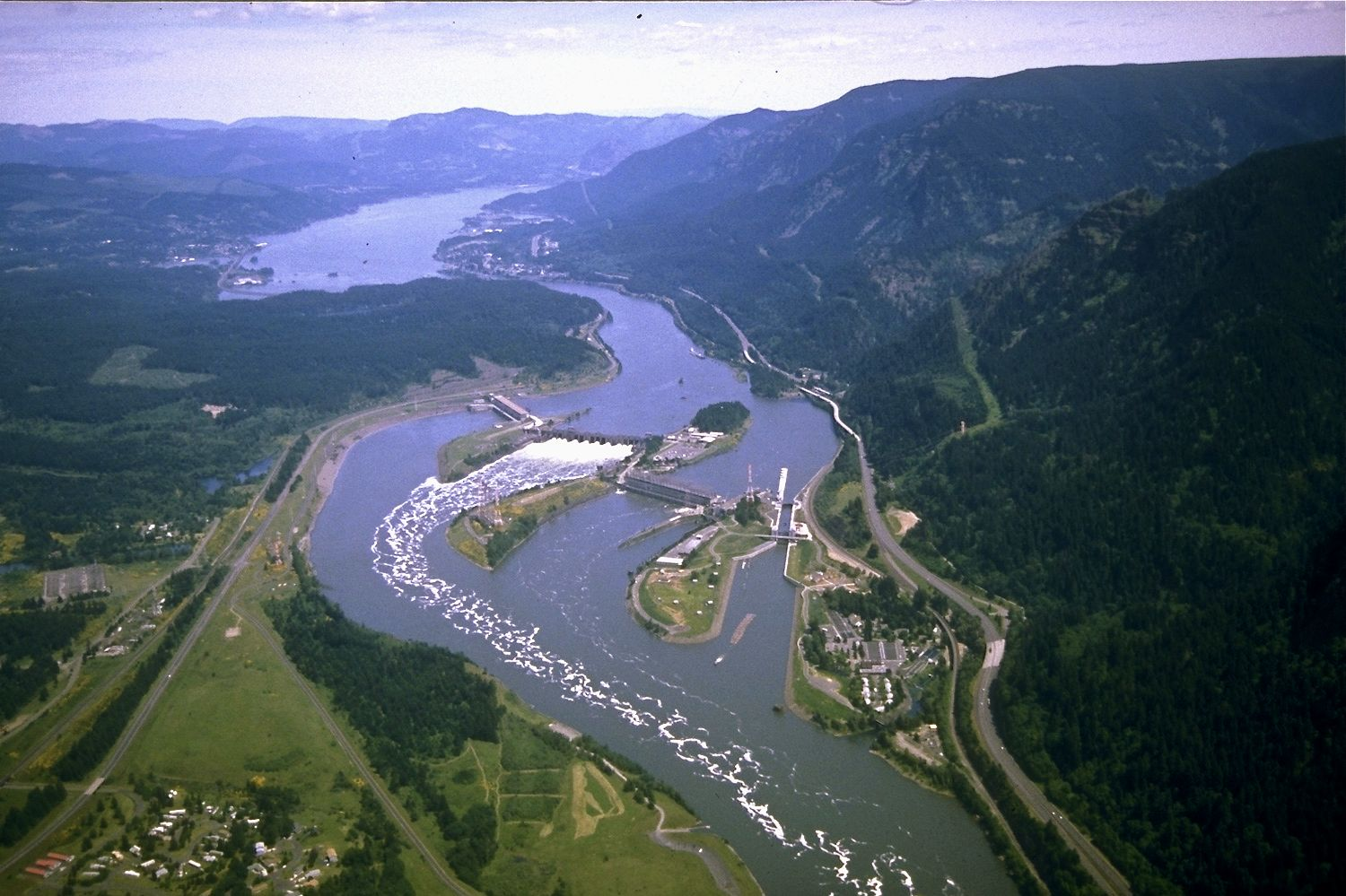
Aerial view of spillway flanked by powerhouses, Bonneville Lock (near right) and Lake

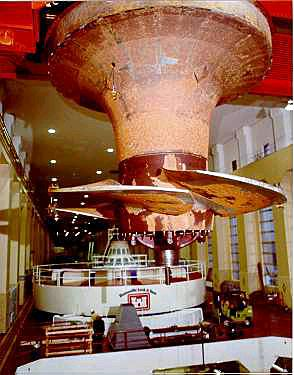
A Bonneville Dam Kaplan turbine after 61 years of service

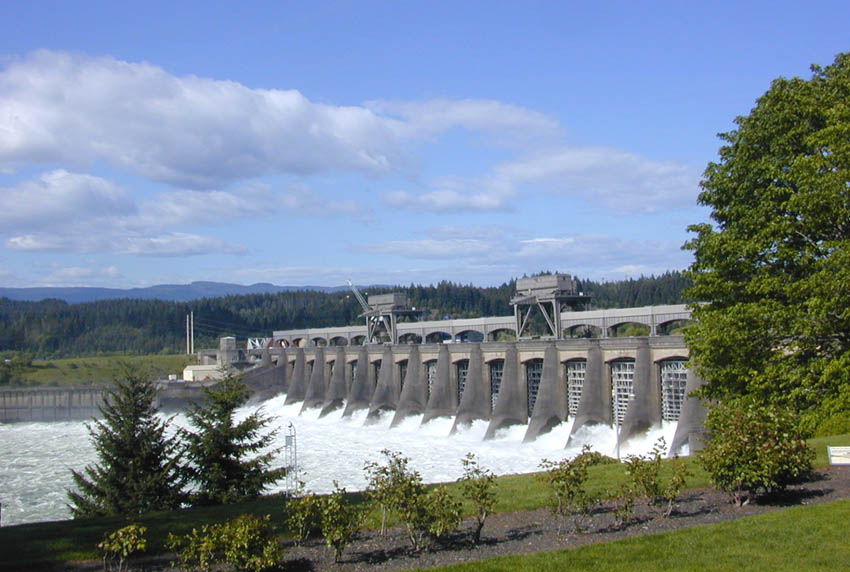
View of Bonneville Dam

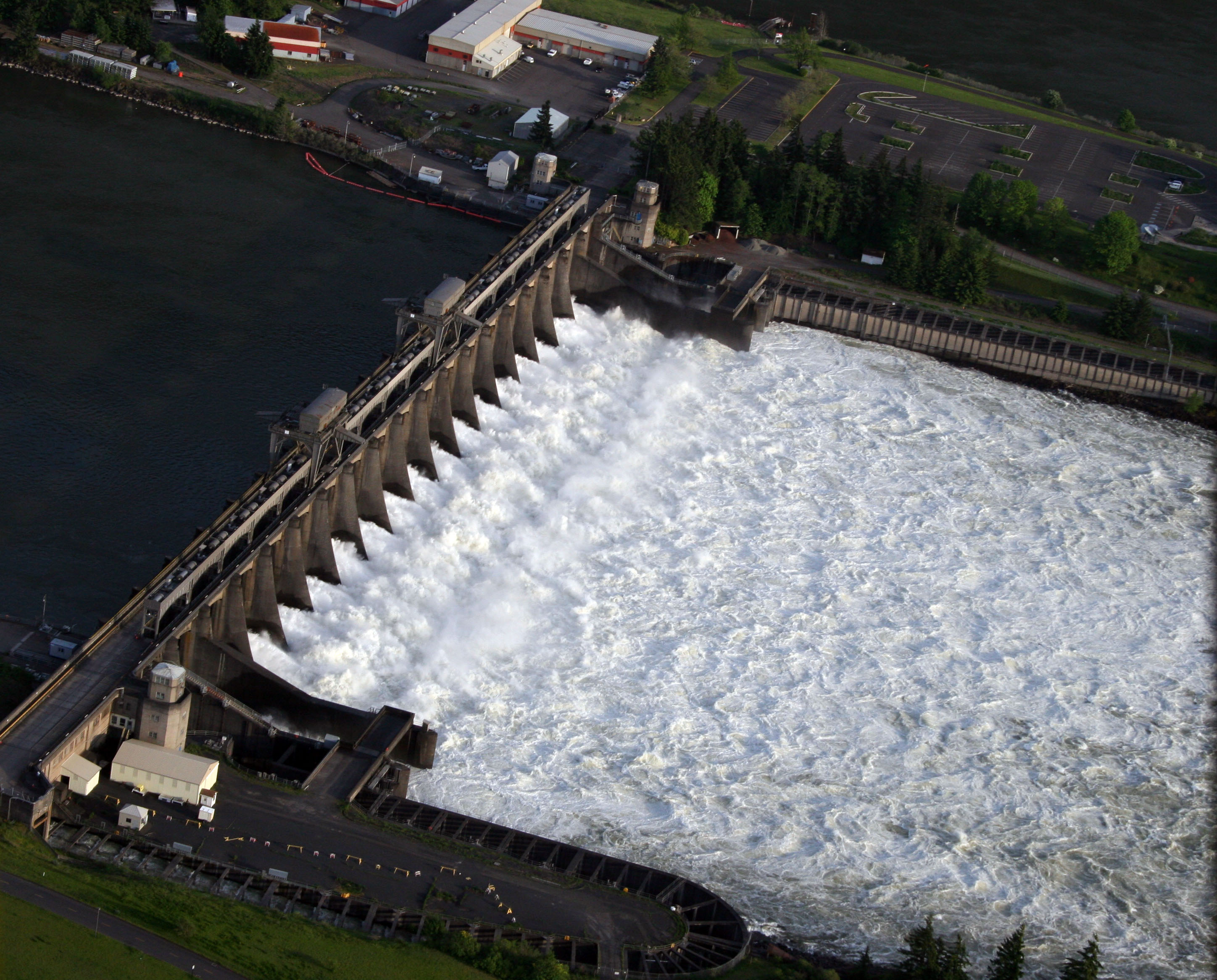
Spillway from the air

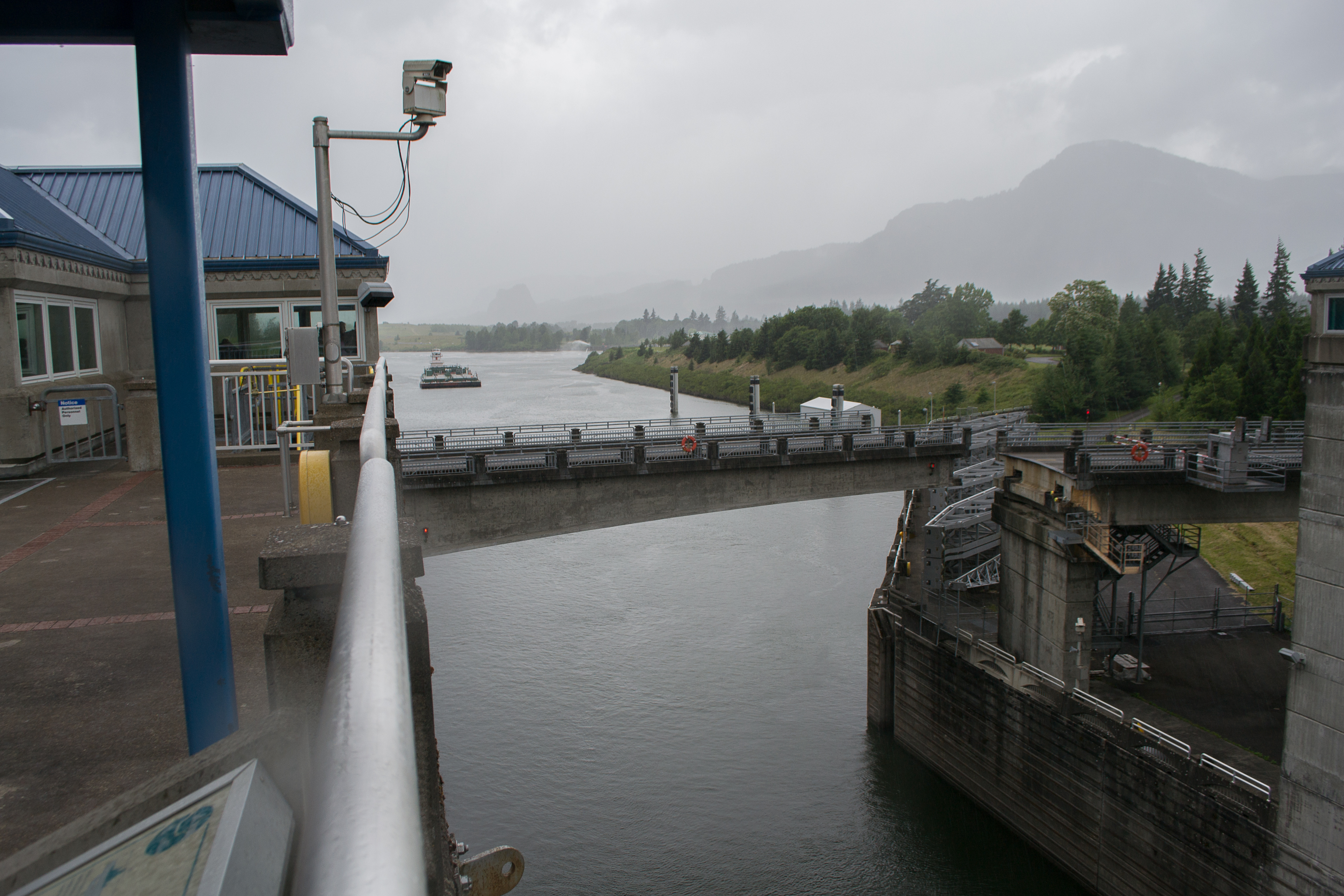
The swing bridge begins to open as a barge approaches the Bonneville Navigation Locks

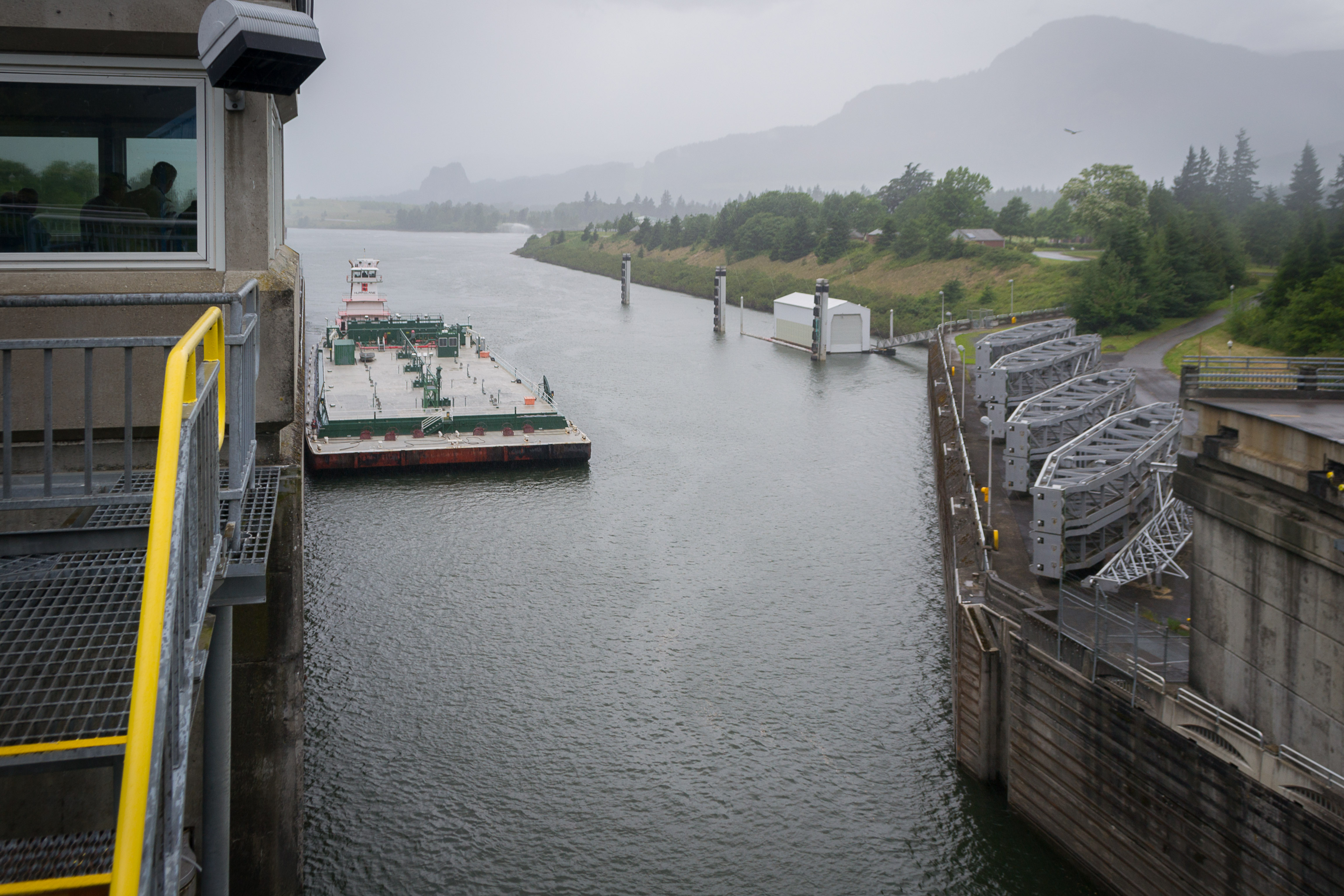
The swing bridge is open as a barge approaches the Bonneville Navigation Locks

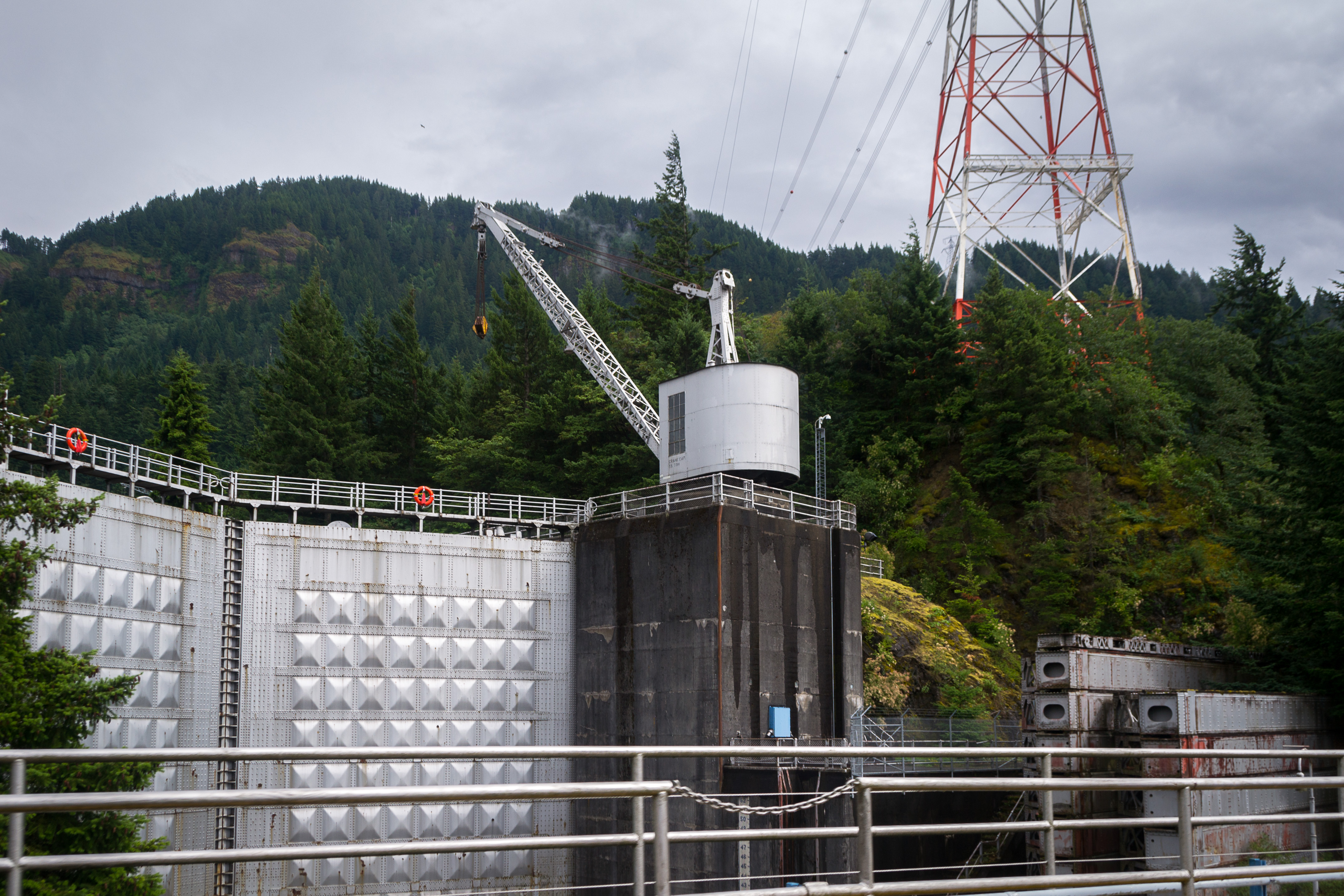
The original downstream gates of the old Bonneville Navigation Locks

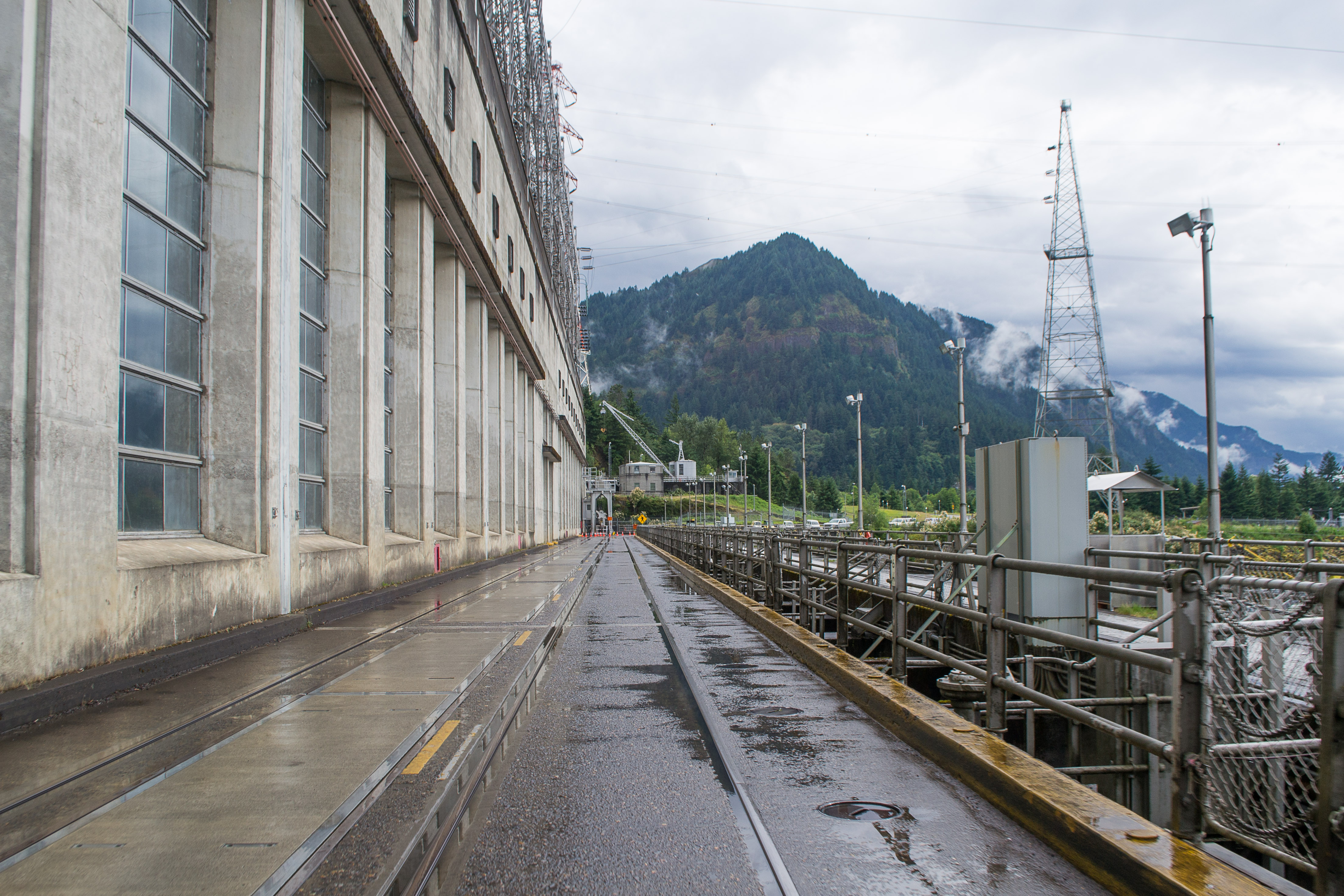
A view of the first powerhouse

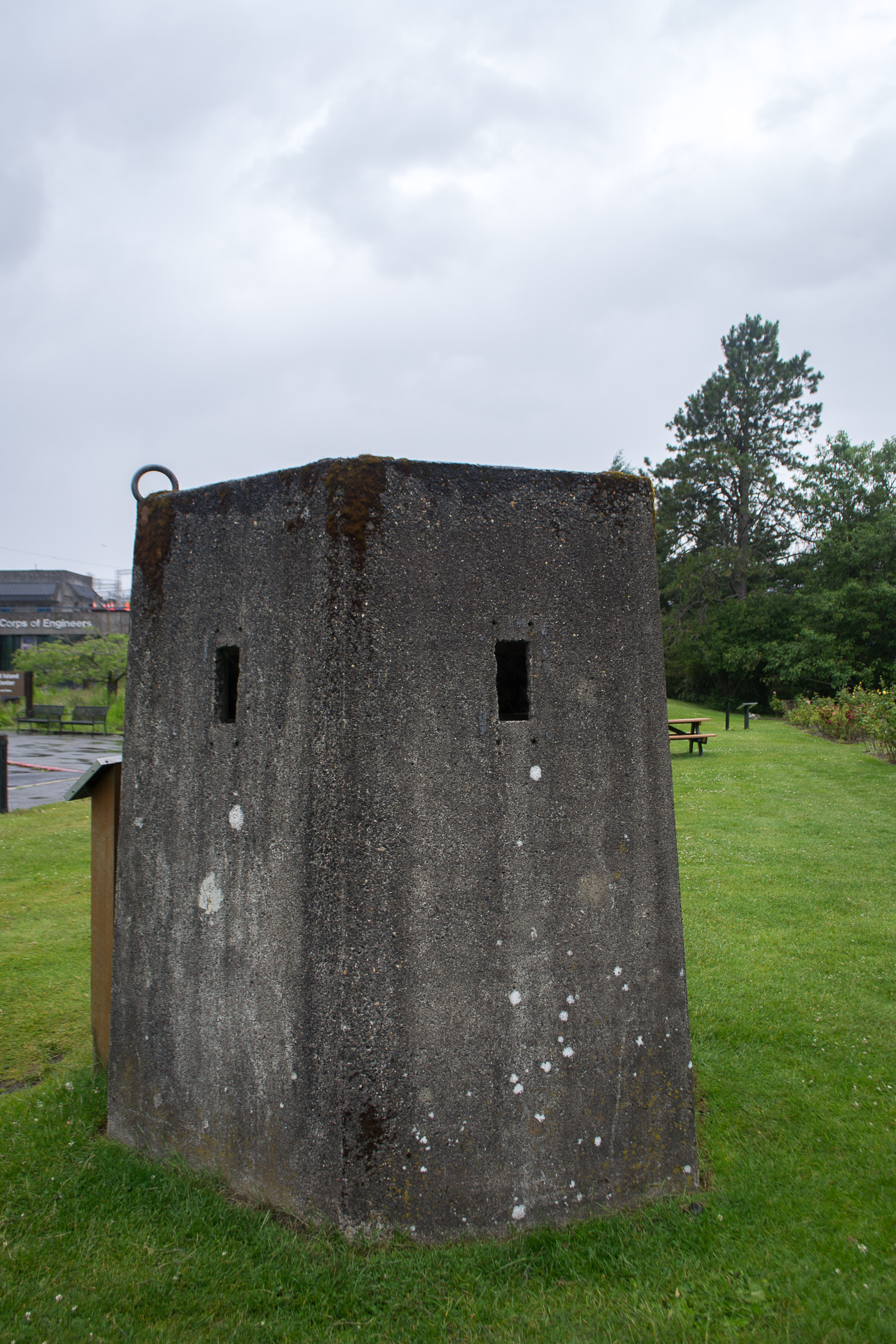
A guardhouse constructed during World War II

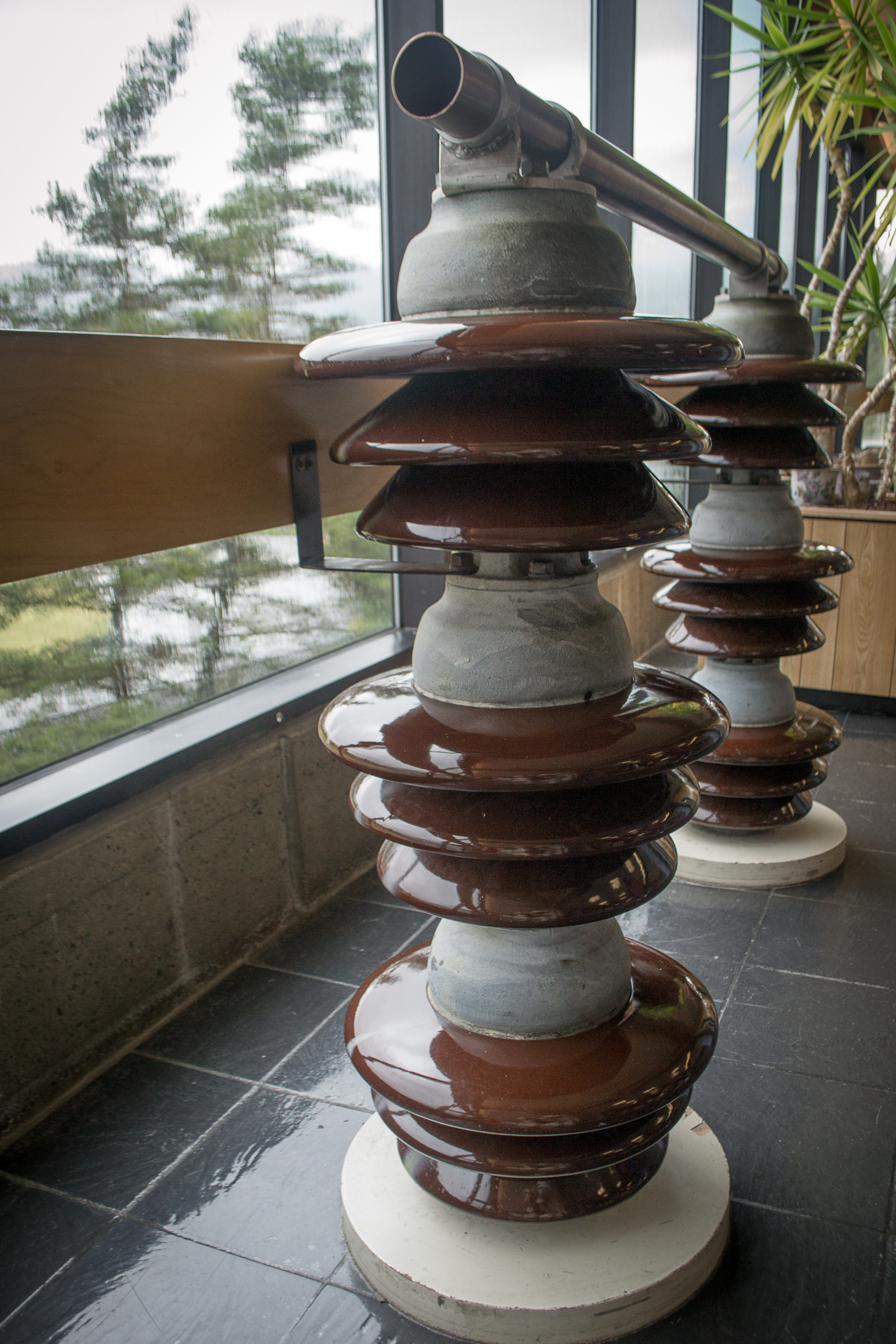
Post insulators and a bus bar at the visitors center

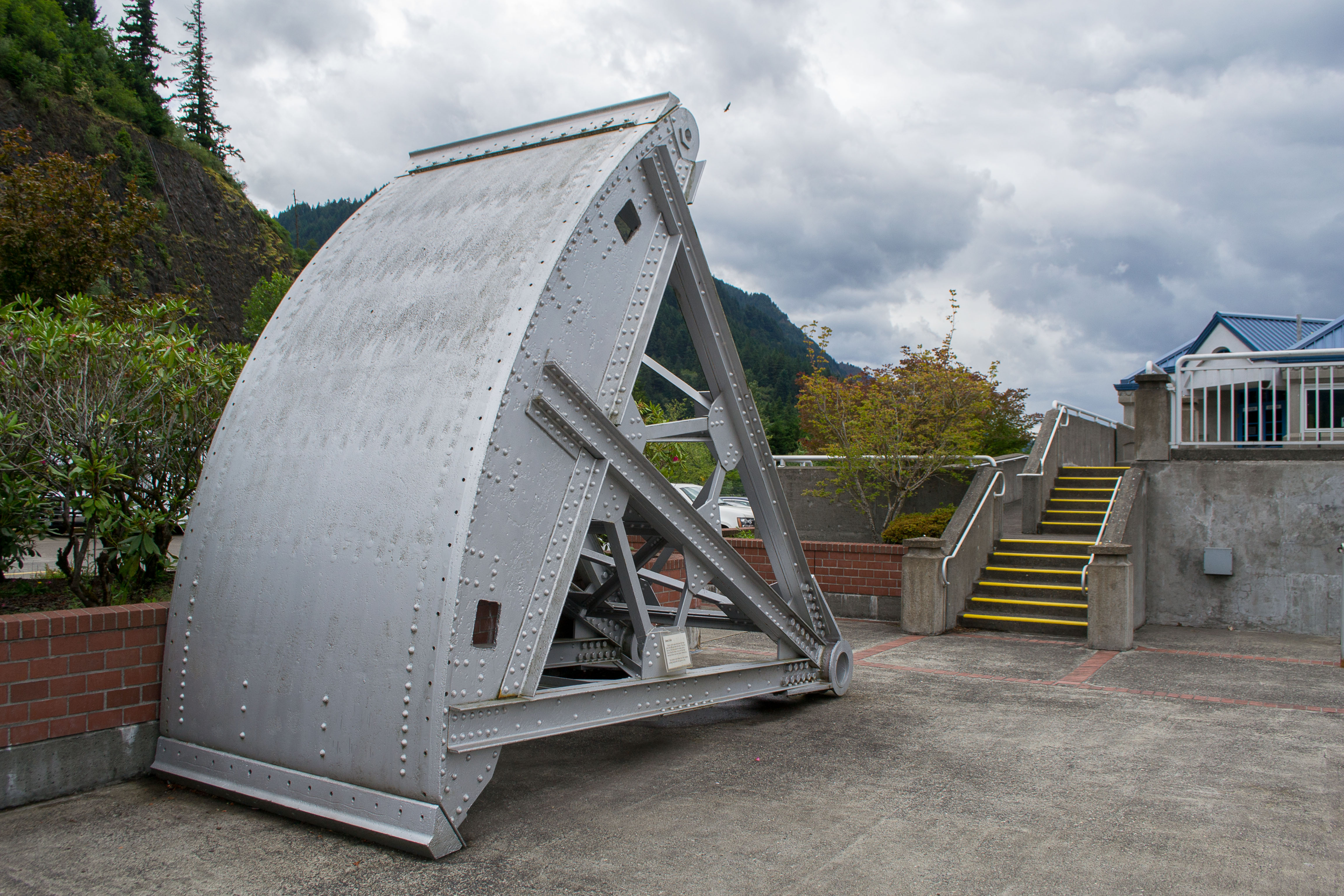
A Tainter valve at the navigation locks visitors center

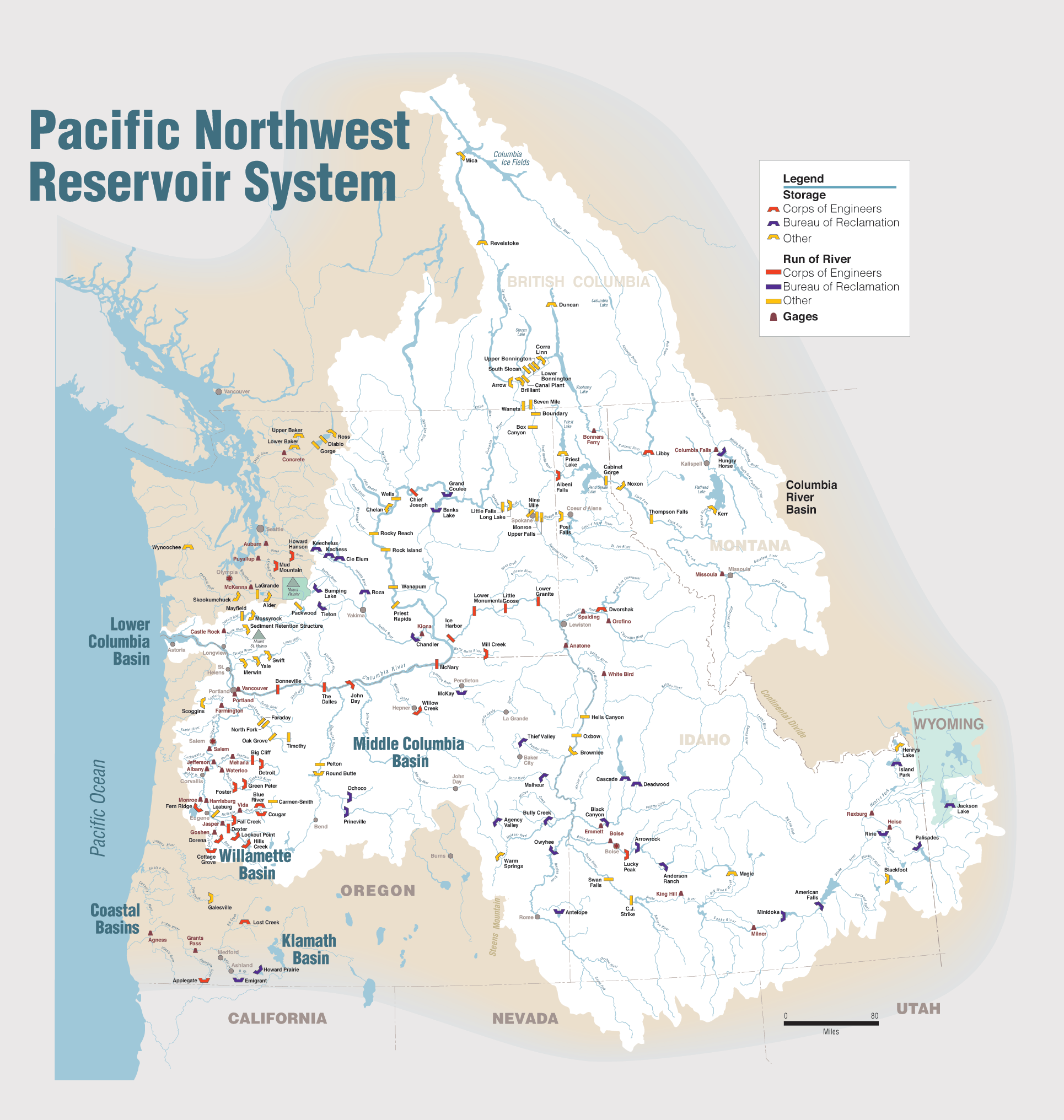
Pacific Northwest River System

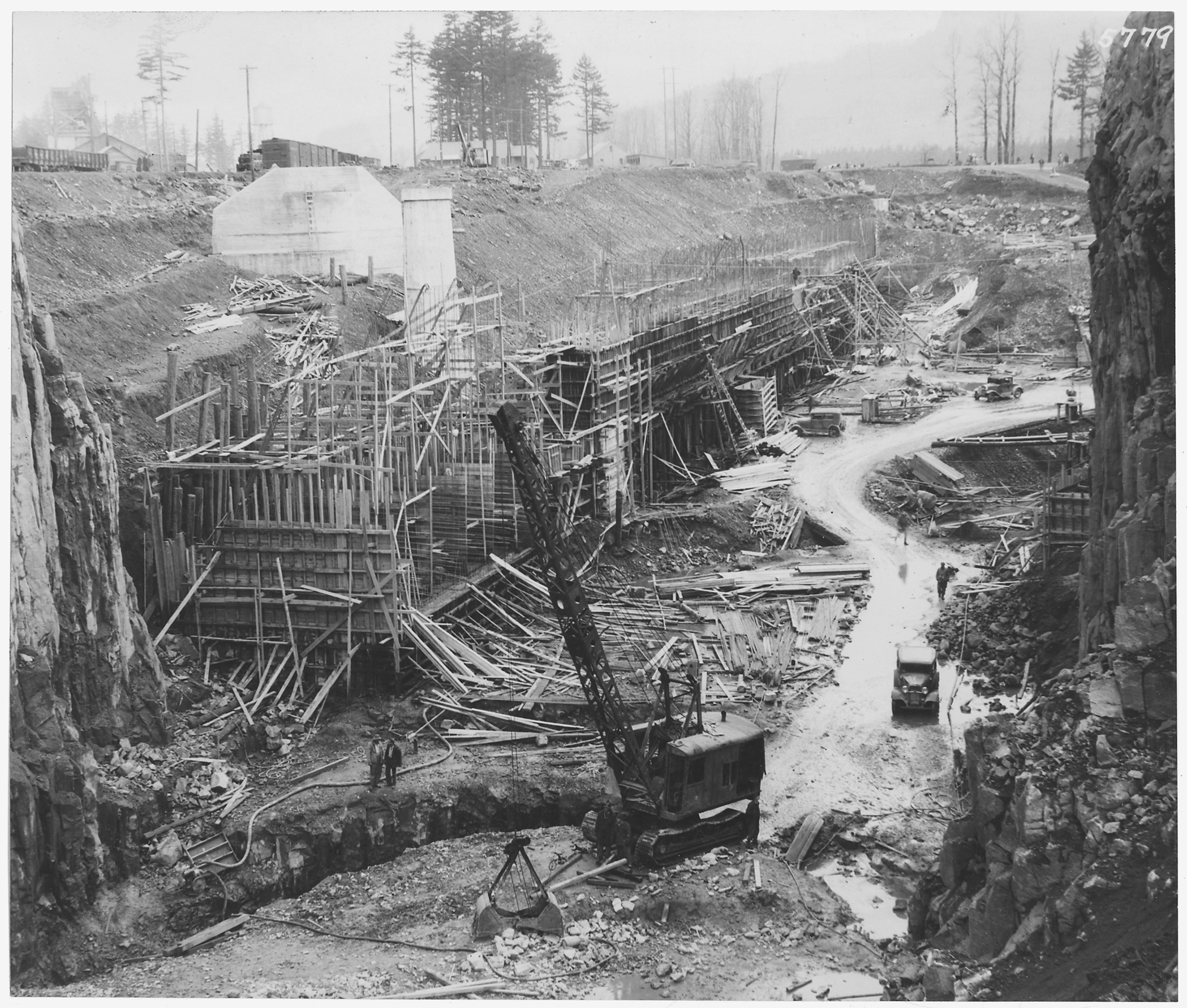
Public Works Administration Project, Bonneville Dam in Oregon, "Excavation for Navigation Lock and Approach Channel" - NARA – 197161

== See also ==
- Cascade Locks and Canal, which preceded the construction of the dam
- Grand Coulee Dam, a much larger dam far upstream on the Columbia River
- Charles McNary, a U.S. Senator from Oregon who was instrumental in passing legislation to build the dam
- List of dams in the Columbia River watershed
