= Lake Bonneville (Oregon) =

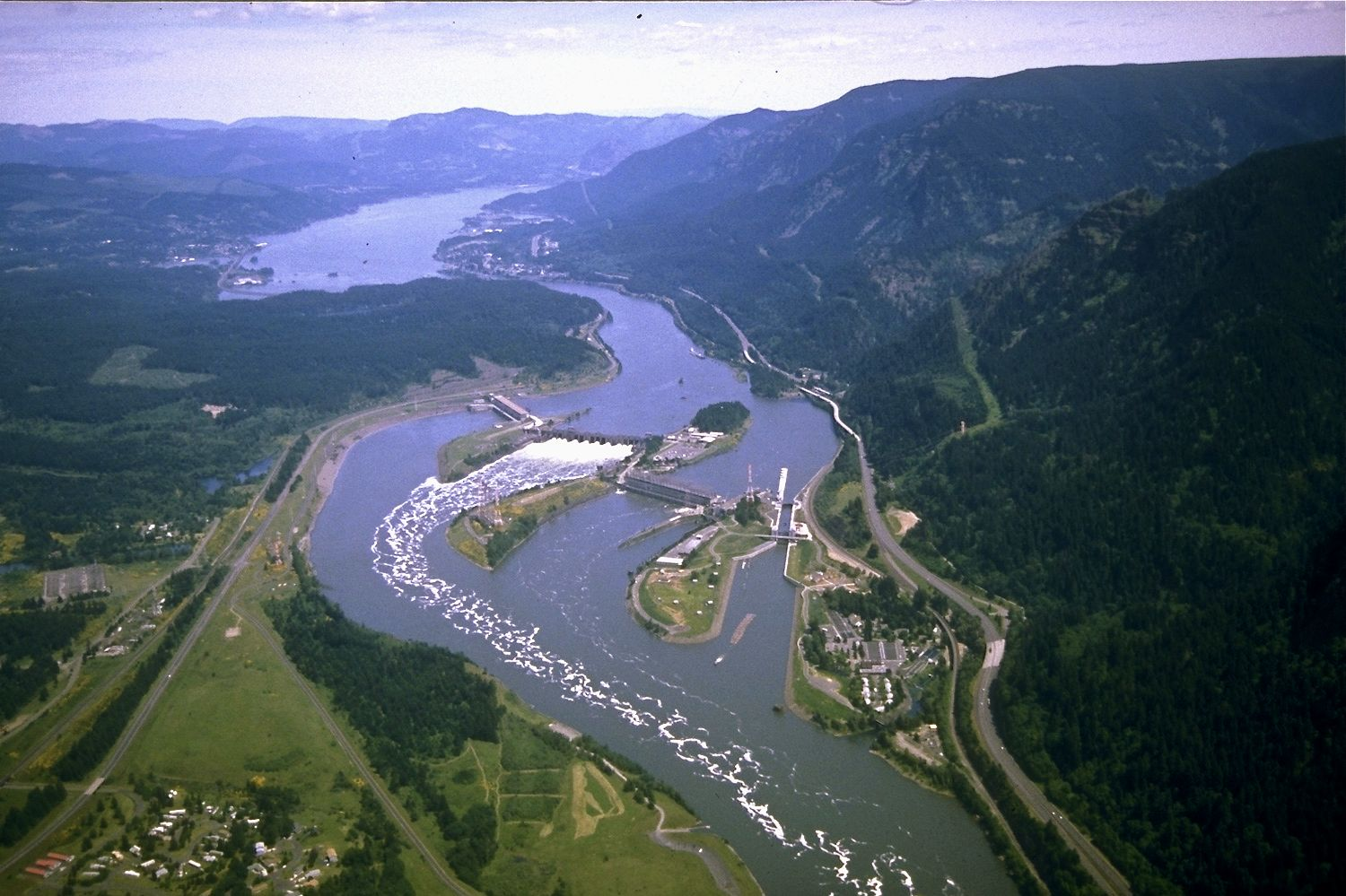
- View eastward from Bonneville Dam. Lake Bonneville is upriver from the dam. The narrow section is the inundated Cascade Rapids.

- Location within Oregon Location within Washington (state) Location within the United States
- Location: Oregon / Washington, United States
- Coordinates: 45°42′23″N 121°48′39″W
- Type: reservoir
- Primary inflows: Columbia River
- Primary outflows: Columbia River
- Basin countries: United States
- Max. length: 46.8 miles (75.3 km)

Lake Bonneville is a reservoir on the Columbia River in the U.S. states of Oregon and Washington. It was created in 1937 with the construction of Bonneville Dam. The reservoir stretches between it and The Dalles Dam, upstream. The lake is about 45 miles long and just under a mile at its widest point. It lies in parts of three counties in Oregon (Multnomah, Hood River, Wasco) and two more counties in Washington (Skamania, Klickitat). It is near the Bonneville Fish Hatchery, the largest in Oregon.

== See also ==
- List of dams in the Columbia River watershed
- List of lakes in Oregon
