= Cote Bonneville =

Historic house in Ohio, United States

- U.S. National Register of Historic Places
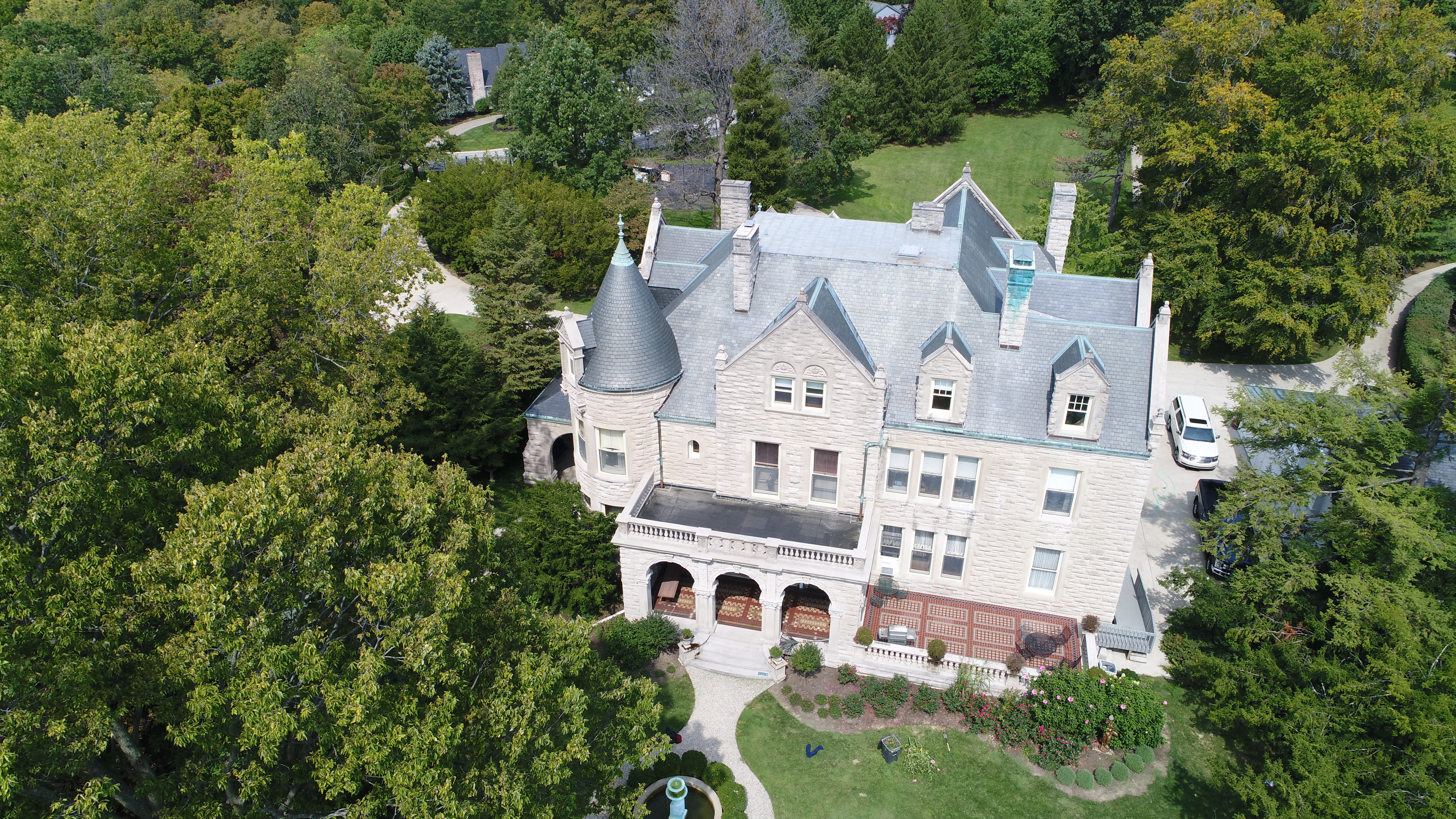
- Aerial shot of the front of the house.

- Location within Ohio Location within the United States
- Location: 4850 Colerain Ave., Cincinnati, Ohio
- Coordinates: 39°10′13″N 84°33′21″W
- Area: Mt. Airy
- Built: 1902
- Architect: Franklin, William W.
- Architectural style: Romanesque, French Country
- NRHP reference No.: 84000448
- Added to NRHP: November 29, 1984

Cote Bonneville is a registered historic building in Cincinnati, Ohio, listed in the National Register on November 29, 1984.

== Historic uses ==
- Single Dwelling
- Clubhouse
- Church Related Residence
