= List of steamboats on the Columbia River =

This is a list of steamboats and related vessels which operated on the Columbia river and its tributaries and in the state of Oregon, including its coastal areas. This should not be considered a complete list. Information for some vessels may be lacking, or sources may be in conflict.

This list summarizes basic characteristics of steamboats placed in service on the Columbia River and its tributaries. The articles Steamboats of the Columbia River, Steamboats of the Arrow Lakes, British Columbia, Steamboats of Columbia River, Wenatchee Reach, Steamboats of the Cowlitz River, and Steamboats of the Willamette River expand on the topic

== Table codes key ==
=== Disposition codes ===
Disposition codes used in this list are:

- A = Abandoned.
- B = Burned
- C = Converted; C-B = Converted to barge; C-D = converted to diesel engine; C-F = Converted to ferry; C-G = Converted to gasoline engine; C-H = Converted to house; C-S = converted to sailing vessel
- D = Dismantled
- F = Foundered at sea
- G = Grounded (total loss)
- L = Laid up
- M = Museum as of 2017
- N = Name change
- O = Operational as of date given
- R = Rebuilt
- RN = Rebuilt and name changed
- S = sank
- T = Transferred; T-AK = Transferred to Alaska; T-BC = Transferred to British Columbia; T-CA = Transferred to California; T-WA = Transferred to Oregon or to Columbia River; T-GH = Transferred to Grays Harbor
- W = Wrecked by collision or striking ground
- X = Explosion of boiler

=== Vessel types ===
- Stern = sternwheeler
- Side = sidewheeler
- Prop = propeller-driven

=== Other abbreviations ===
- GT = Gross Tons; RT = Registered Tons
- YB = Year Built
- Dspo = Disposition type
- Ldng = Landing
- Rpds = Rapids

Vessels should not be assumed to have served continuously in Oregon or on the Columbia river and its tributaries during the periods shown on this chart; transfer between service areas was common.

== Gallery of vessel types ==
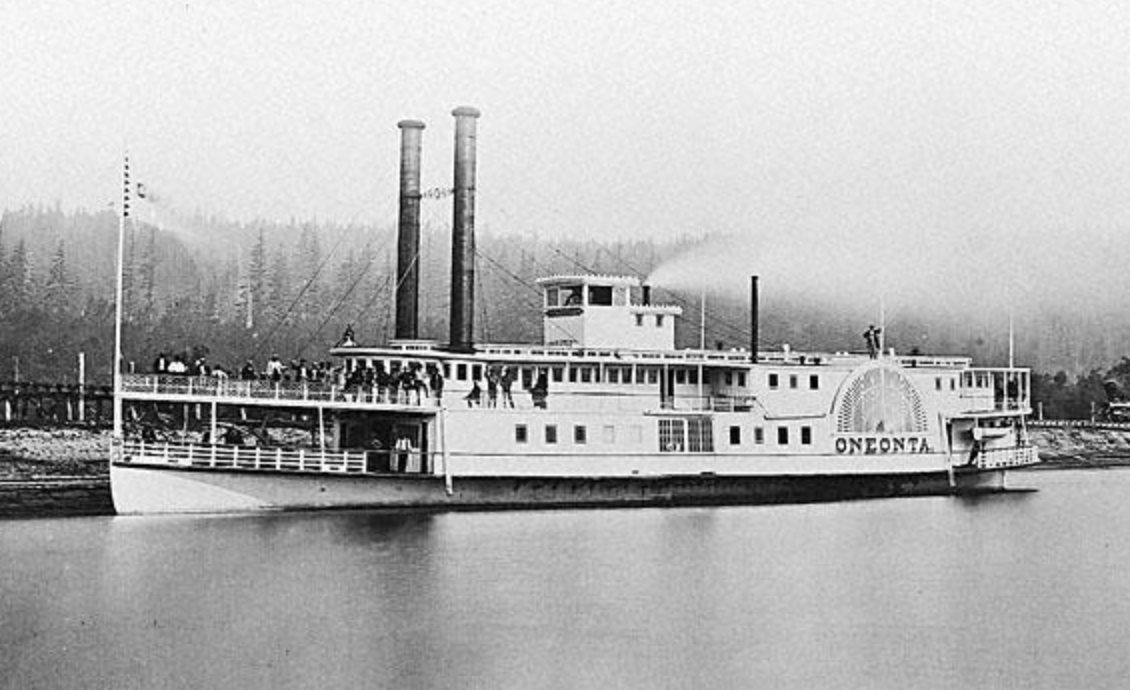
Oneonta, an early example of a sidewheeler on the Columbia river, in 1867

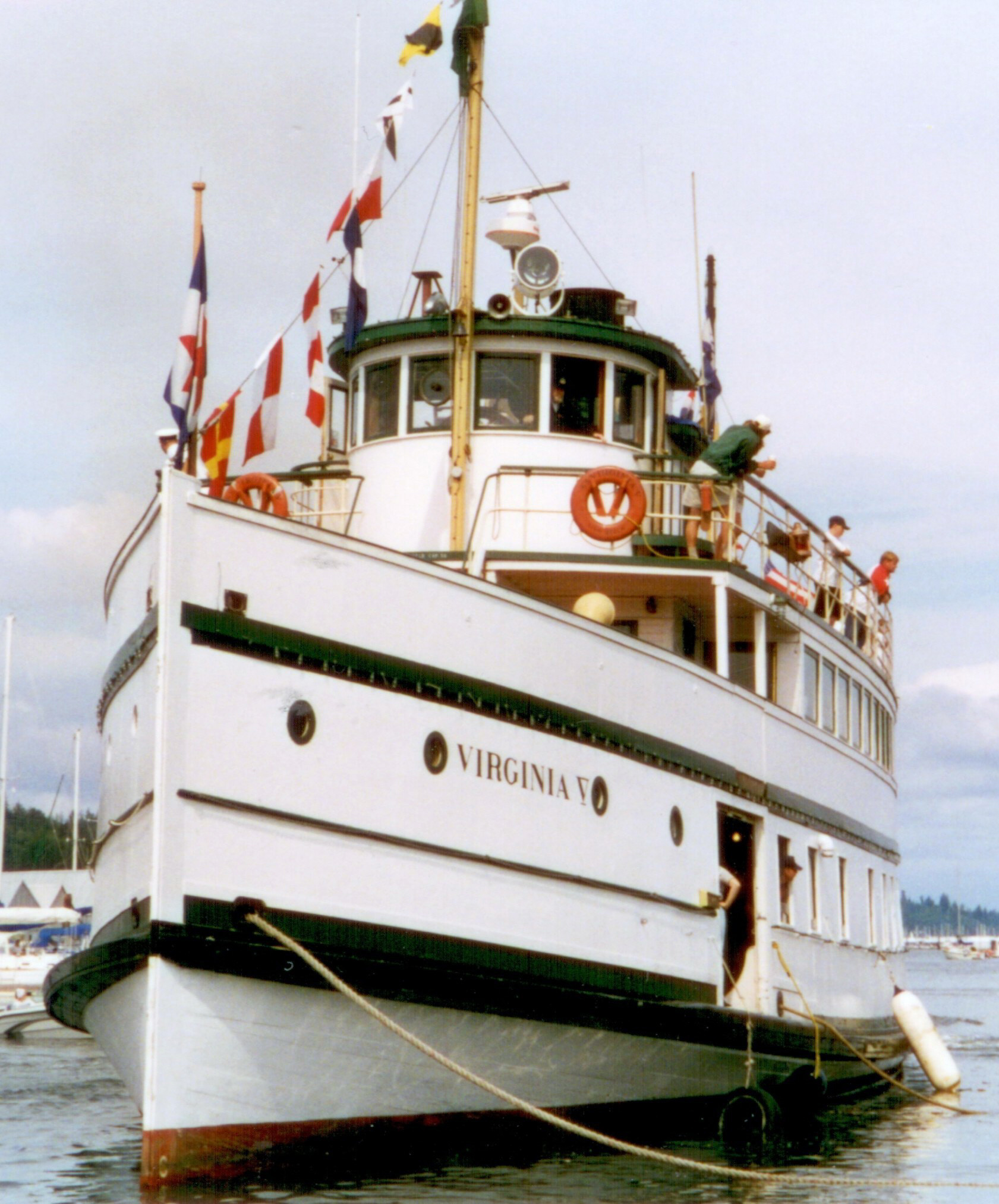
Virginia V, proper-driven steamship, July 4, 1996

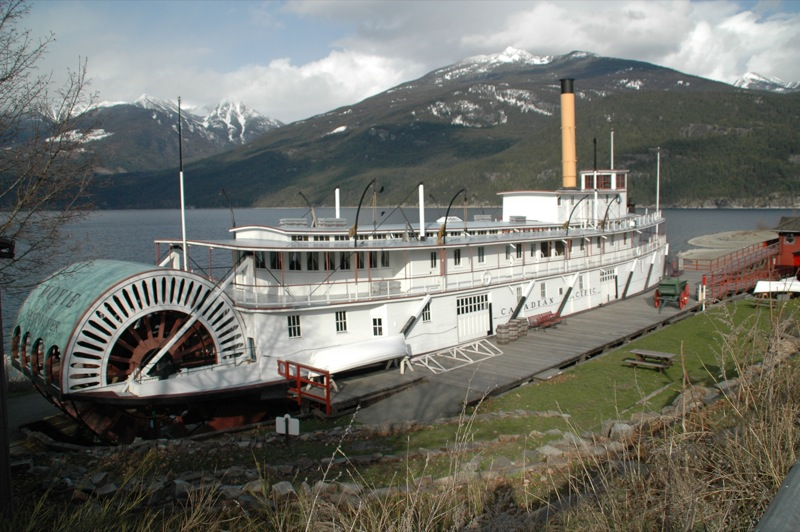
Moyie, a steel-framed hull sternwheeler in 2008 at Kaslo, BC, preserved as a museum

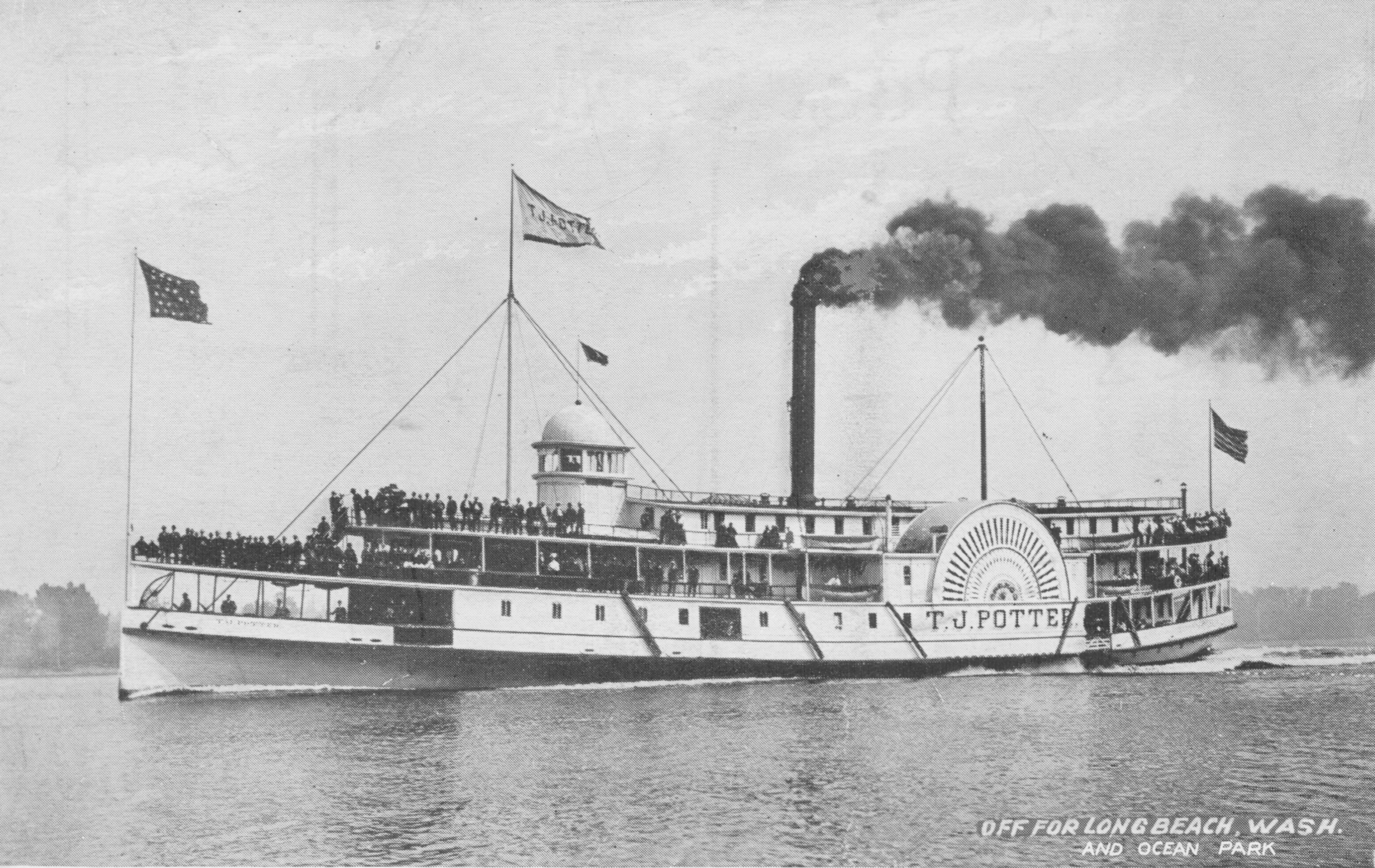
T.J. Potter, sidewheeler, circa 1901, on the Columbia or Willamette river

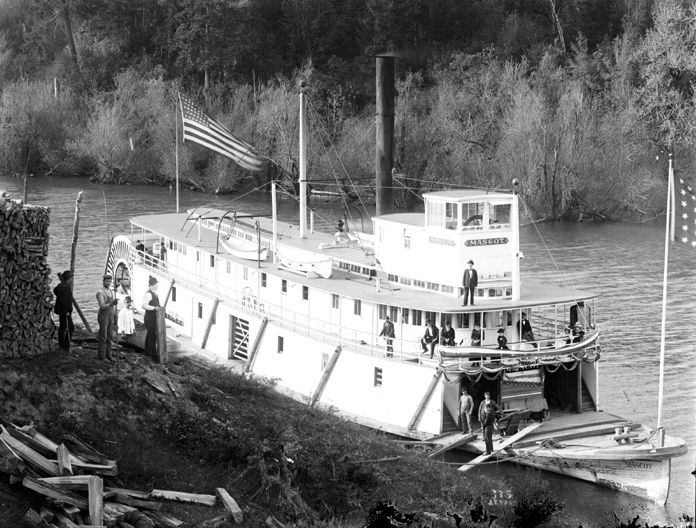
Mascot, a typical wooden-hulled sternwheeler, "wooding up", circa 1900

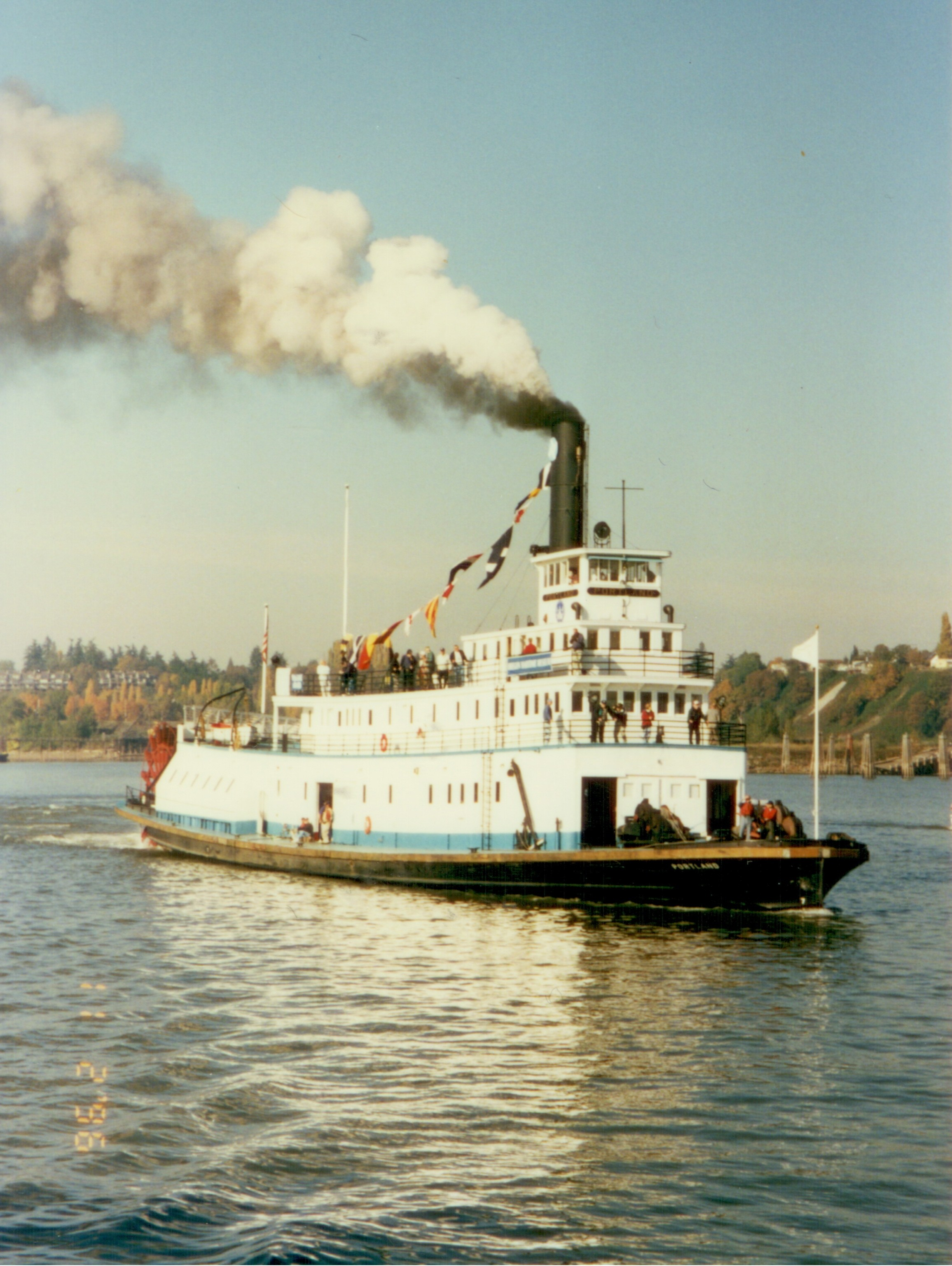
Portland, steel-hulled sternwheeler, 1996

== List of vessels ==
Steam vessels of Oregon and the Columbia River and its tributaries
Name	Reg #	Type	Use	YB	Where built	Length		GT	RT	End yr	Dsp
Name	Reg #	Type	Use	YB	Where built	ft	m	GT	RT	End yr	Dsp
A.A. McCully	105725	stern	psgr	1877	Oregon City, Oregon	148	45.1	498	364	1885	B
A.B. Field	106147	prop	genl	1883	Astoria, Oregon	69	21.0	59	37	1895	O
A. Booth (gas)	200821	prop	psgr	1904	Astoria, Oregon	51	15.5	14	10	1907	O
Aberdeen	C100675	stern	psgr	1893	Okanagan Ldng, BC	146	44.5	554	349	1916	D
Active	1232	stern	psgr	1865	Canemah, Oregon	122	37.2	260		1872	D
Adam Hall	C116927	prop	tow	1906	Arrowhead, BC	112	34.1	144	55	1917	L
Adel (gas)	202589	prop	psgr	1905	Marshfield, Oregon	35	10.7	8	6	1907	O
Advance (gas)		stern		1903	Portland, Oregon	70	21.3	11		1911	
Alarm (1887)	106940	prop	genl	1887	Portland, Oregon	70	21.3	27	16	1896	O
Alarm (1902) (Note: Ex Maja, US #93295.)	93295	prop	tow	1902	Hood River, Oregon	54	16.5	22	10	1915	O
Alaskan	106232	side	psgr	1883	Chester, Pennsylvania	276	84.1	1,718	1,259	1889	F
Albany (1868)	1738	stern	psgr	1868	Canemah, Oregon	127	38.7	328		1875	W
Albany (1896) (Note: Ex N.S. Bentley, US #130364.)	107218	stern	psgr	1896	Portland, Oregon	151	46.0	431	401	1906	RB (Note: Rebuilt and renamed Georgie Burton, US #203101.)
Alberta (Note: Ex State of Idaho, US #116557.)	C103296	stern	psgr	1893	Bonners Ferry, Idaho	140	42.7	508	320	1905	D
Albina (1881)	105962	side	ferry	1881	Portland, Oregon	85	25.9	85	85	1898	
Albina No. 2	104244	side	ferry	1883	Portland, Oregon	107	32.6	205	151	1893	O
Albina Ferry No. 1	106446	side	ferry	1886	Portland, Oregon	48	14.6	22	22	1887	O
Alert (1865)	1233	stern	psgr	1865	Oswego, Oregon	135	41.1	341		1871	RN (Note: Rebuilt and renamed E.N. Cooke.)
Alert (1890)	106768	stern	psgr	1890	Bandon, Oregon	69	21.0	97	59	1907	O
Alexander (gas)	204301	stern	psgr	1907	Astoria, Oregon	39	11.9	13	9	1911	R
Alexander Griggs	200046	stern	psgr	1903	Wenatchee, WA	100	30.5	144	91	1905	W
Alice	105098	stern	psgr	1873	Canemah, Oregon	151	46.0	457	334	1888	D
Alice A.	107203	prop	psgr	1895	Portland, Oregon	42	12.8	6	5	1896	O
Alice V.	106733	prop	ferry	1899	Salem, Oregon	66	20.1	41	41	1896	
Alida	105028	side	psgr	1870	Seattle, WA	107	32.6	115		1892	
Allan		prop	genl	1852		40	12.2	10		1856	
Alkali	106294	side	genl	1884	Alkali, Oregon	61	18.6	24	20	1900	
Almota	105639	stern	psgr	1876	Celilo, Oregon	157	47.9	502	395	1901	D
Alpha (1882)		prop	genl	1882	Arrow Lakes, BC					1882	O
Alpha (1888)		prop	genl	1888	Wallowa Lake, Oregon						
Alton	106808	stern	launch	1891	Chicago, Illinois	35	10.7	14	9	1894	O
Altona (1890)	106729	stern	psgr	1890	Portland, Oregon	120	36.6	201	190	1899	R
Altona	107453	stern	psgr	1899	Portland, Oregon	123	37.5	329	242	1907	T-AK
Altoona (gas)	200570	prop	psgr	1904	Astoria, Oregon	45	13.7	13	9	1907	O
Alvina (gas)	200923	prop	psgr	1904	Astoria, Oregon	40	12.2	9	6	1907	O
Alviso	107153	stern	psgr	1895	Sausalito, California	115	35.1	197	168	1910	T-CA
Amberly		stern	genl	1912	Flathead Lake, Montana					1914	N (Note: Renamed White and worked on Swan Lake (Montana) from 1914 to 1917.)
Amelia Wheaton		stern	psgr	1880	Ft Coeur d'Alene, Idaho	86	26.2			1892	D
America (1899)	107437	prop	psgr	1899	Portland, Oregon	94	28.7	99	67	1906	O
America (1912)	210348	prop	psgr	1912	Portland, Oregon	105	32.0	97	62	1941	D
Anita		stern	psgr	1912	McMinnville, Oregon	10	3.0			1894	D
Ann (Note: ex Lewiston, US #1737.)	1737	stern	psgr	1867	Umatilla, Oregon	83	25.3	83		1878	O
Anne W.		prop	tow	1913	Portland, Oregon	88	26.8	84		1915	T-AK
Anna Barron	107759	prop	tow	1902	Astoria, Oregon	77	23.5	82	56	1930	W
Annerly	106963	stern	genl	1892	Jennings, Montana	93	28.3	128	80	1892	D
Annie	106295	prop	genl	1884	Astoria, Oregon	40	12.2	13	7	1896	O
Annie Commings (1903) (Note: Ex Wm. M. Hoag US #81171. Also spelled Annie Comings.)	81171	stern	psgr	1889	East Portland, Oregon	150	45.7	452	431	1907	W
Annie Commings (1909) (Note: Ex Wm. M. Hoag, US #81171.)	206116	stern	tow	1909	Vancouver, WA	151	46.0	464	414	1941	A
Annie Faxon (1877)	105718	stern	tow	1877	Celilo, Oregon	165	50.3	709	565	1887	R
Annie Faxon (1887)	106588	stern	tow	1877	Celilo, Oregon	165	50.3	514	488	1893	X
Annie Laurie (Note: Ex Hooligan.)		stern	frt.	1909	Klamath Falls, Oregon	80	24.4				C-B
Annie Stewart	1218	stern	genl	1864	San Francisco, California	155	47.2	316		1881	T-PS
Antelope	106440	prop	fish	1909	Marshfield, Oregon	60	18.3	29	20	1908	D
Argenta	C107825	stern	psgr	1900	Mirror Lake, BC	92	28.0	206	130	1910	L
Argo	105152	prop	genl	1869	San Francisco, California	50	15.2	14		1874	L
Argonaut	105969	prop	genl	1881	Portland, Oregon	76	23.2	41	20	1896	O
Aricia (gas)		prop	ferry	1912	Okanagan Lake, BC	50	15.2	13		1916	O
Artisan (gas)	208820	stern	genl	1911	Portland, Oregon	40	12.2	15	8	1922	R
Asotin		stern	dredge	1913	Celilo, Oregon	140	42.7	200		1919	L
Astoria (1859)	1859	side	gel	1868	San Francisco, California	98	29.9	125	62	1885	O
Astoria (1884)		prop	tow	1884	North Bend, Oregon					1895	O
Astorian (1890) (Note: Ex Clara Parker, US #125915.)	106798	stern	psgr	1890	Portland, Oregon	142	43.3	362	234	1908	A
Astorian (1911) (Note: Ex Nisqually.)	208596	stern	psgr	1911	Dockton, WA	127	38.7	255	173	1923	W
Augusta	106593	prop	psgr	1888	Oneatta, Oregon	79	24.1	77	41	1896	O
B.H. Smith, Jr. (Note: Ex Metlako (US # 3830), ex Bonita (US #3830).)	3839	stern	psgr	1900	Portland, Oregon	109	33.2	91	87	1931	A
Baby		stern	genl	1894	Eugene, Oregon	30	9.1			1895	D
Bailey Gatzert (1890)	3488	stern	psgr	1890	Ballard, WA	177	53.9	560	444	1907	R
Bailey Gatzert (1907)	204289	stern	psgr	1907	Seattle, WA	194	59.1	642	536	1918	T-PS
Banshee (gas 1907)	204102	prop	psgr	1907	Marshfield, Oregon	39	11.9	8	5	1907	O
Banshee (1908)		stern	genl	1908	Coolin, Idaho	60	18.3			1908	W
Barry K. (Note: Ex Lewiston, US #223498.)	223498	stern	genl	1923	Linnton, Oregon	160	48.8	581	422	1942	T-AK
Bay View		prop	tow		Sand Point, Idaho					1913	O
Beaton	C155083	prop	tow	1928	Nakusp, BC	69	21.0			1958	N (Note: Renamed Arrow No. 1.)
Beaver (1835)		side	frt.	1835	London	102	31.1	109		1835	T-PS
Beaver (1873)	2889	stern	psgr	1873	Oregon City	125	38.1	292		1876	T-BC
Beaver (1906) (Note: Ex Glenola, US #86041.)	202837	stern	psgr	1906	Portland, Oregon	152	46.3	421	367	1934	W
Belleville		prop	psgr	1853	Coeur d'Alene, Idaho	58	17.7			1897	O
Belle (Note: Officially named Belle of Oregon City.)		side	psgr	1853	Linn City, Oregon	90	27.4	54		1869	D
Ben Holladay	2792	prop	tow			80	24.4	46		1882	D
Benton	3213	prop	genl	1883	Portland, Oregon	44	13.4	9		1885	O
Bernice (gas)	200792	prop	psgr	1904	Cathlamet, WA	46	14.0	13	9	1907	O
Bertha (1879)	2094	prop	genl	1879	Empire City, Oregon	38	11.6	12	11	1895	O
Bertha (gas 1915)	212991	stern	ferry	1915	Wallula, WA	50	15.2	15	15	1925	A
Bessie		stern	genl	1884	Castle Rock, W.T.	67	20.4			1885	D
Betty (gas)	201370	prop	psgr	1904	Astoria, Oregon	52	15.8	14	10	1907	O
Bismarck	3561	stern	psgr	1892	Woodland, WA	104	31.7	191	144	1898	W
Blackhawk		prop	psgr	1850		30	9.1	10		1852	D
Blanco	3573	prop	genl	1893	Marshfield, Oregon	62	18.9	38	19	1896	O
Bonanza	2978	stern	psgr	1875	Portland, Oregon	152	46.3	651	468	1888	W
Boneta (1904)		stern	psgr	1904	Coeur d'Alene, Idaho	96	29.3				
Bonita (1875)	2960	stern	psgr	1875	Portland, Oregon	96	29.3	527	377	1892	W
Bonita (1887)		prop	genl	1887	Porterville, Oregon						
Bonita (1900)	3839	stern	psgr	1900	Portland, Oregon	109	33.2	198	122	1902	N (Note: Renamed Metlako, US #3830.)
Bonita (gas)	204144	prop	psgr	1907	Marshfield, Oregon	46	14.0	14	11	1907	O
Bonnington	C130555	stern	psgr	1911	Nakusp, BC	203	61.9	1,663	955	1931	L
Brewster Ferry (gas)		side	ferry	1926	Brewster, WA	52	15.8	22		1942	W
Bridgeport	215053	stern	psgr	1917	Pateros, WA	122	37.2	438	342	1941	A
Buffalo (gas)	202582	prop	psgr	1905	Prosper, Oregon	34	10.4	9	6	1907	O
Buffalo Bill (gas)	202638	prop	psgr	1905	Marshfield, Oregon	35	10.7	7	5	1907	O
Butte	211721	prop	psgr	1913	Astoria, Oregon	68	20.7	94	64	1915	O
Butterfly	200443	prop	psgr	1903	Portland, Oregon	75	22.9	39	27	1915	O
Brazee		prop	psgr	1877	Knappton, W.T.					1895	O
C. Minsinger	206353	prop	tow	1909	Portland, Oregon	122	37.2	179	143	1940	A
C.J. Brenham	5790	stern	tow	1874	Humboldt, California	110	33.5	133		1895	L
C.R.P.A. (gas)	216334	stern	frt.	1918	Astoria, Oregon	57	17.4	30	20	1927	R
C.W. Rich	126581	prop	psgr	1889	Astoria, Oregon	40	12.2	31	17	1895	O
Cabinet		stern	genl	1866	Cabinet Rpds, W.T.	113	34.4			1876	D
Calliope	5840	stern	psgr	1870	Corvallis, Oregon	100	30.5	143	91	1887	D
Callendar	127409	prop	psgr	1900	Portland, Oregon	74	22.6	84	57	1922	O
Camano	127303	stern	psgr	1895	Wenatchee, WA	90	27.4	59	40	1904	W
Canadian Nat'l No. 5	C156887	prop	tow	1930	Kelowna, BC	67	20.4	68		1973	L
Canadian Nat'l No. 6		prop	tow	1948	Okanagan Lake, BC	67	20.4	68		1973	L
Canby (1896)	127183	stern	psgr	1896	Portland, Oregon	79	24.1	34	23	1907	O
Canby (1904)	201626	stern	psgr	1904	Keno, Oregon	67	20.4	48	30	1907	O
Canemah		side	psgr	1851	Canemah, Oregon	135	41.1	88		1858	D
Capital City (Note: Ex Dalton.)	157507	stern	psgr	1898	Port Blakely, WA	150	45.7	523	348	1909	L
Capt. Al James	240082	prop	tow	1940	Pasco, WA	75	22.9	162	110		S
Caroline		prop	genl	1849	Philadelphia, Pennsylvania	150	45.7	552		1854	T
Carrie (Note: Ex Rainier, US #5687.)	5687	stern	psgr	1867	Rainer, Oregon	82	25.0	110		1876	D
Carrie Ladd		stern	psgr	1858	Oregon City	126	38.4	128		1864	D
Carrie Norton	125637	stern	psgr	1878	Canemah, Oregon	41	12.5	13		1880	L
Cascade (1864) (Note: Also seen as Cascades.)	5283	stern	psgr	1864	Utsalady, W.T.	155	47.2	401		1874	O
Cascades (1882) (Note: Officially named Cascades of the Columbia, US #127751.)	127751	stern	tow	1882	Portland, Oregon	160	48.8	407	267	1912	R
Cascades (1912) (Note: Officially named Cascades of the Columbia, US #209586.)	209586	stern	genl	1912	Portland, Oregon	160	48.8	407	350	1943	B
Cascadilla (1861)		stern	genl	1861	Osoyoos Lake, BC	91	27.7				D
Cascadilla (1862)		stern	genl	1862	Columbus, W.T.	106	32.3			1866	D
Castlegar	C130566	prop	tow	1911	Okanagan Lndg, BC	94	28.7	104	71	1924	L
Catherine	222841	stern	tow	1923	Portland, Oregon	112	34.1	95	70	1941	L
Celilo	5262	prop	genl	1864	Celilo, Oregon	59	18.0	37	18	1898	
Ceres	125617	prop	genl	1877	Coos Bay, Oregon	51	15.5	20	14	1896	O
Champion	125429	stern	psgr	1875	Portland, Oregon	157	47.9	634	502	1891	W
Charles Bureau	205193	stern	psgr	1908	Okanagan, WA	80	24.4	99	56	1919	A
Charles M. Greiner	208515	prop	tow	1911	Portland, Oregon	67	20.4	45	27	1914	O
Charles R. Spencer	127574	stern	psgr	1901	Portland, Oregon	181	55.2	598	409	1911	N (Note: Renamed Monarch, US #127574.)
Charm (1913)	211489	prop	psgr	1913	Prosper, Oregon	75	22.9	42			
Charm (gas 1911)	208331	stern	psgr	1911	Portland, Oregon	50	15.2	15	13	1913	O
Chelan	127647	stern	genl	1902	Wenatchee, WA	125	38.1	244	154	1915	B
Chester	127201	stern	genl	1897	Portland, Oregon	101	30.8	130	98	1917	A
Chetco		prop	tow							1905	O
Chief	127748	prop	gel	1903	Astoria, Oregon	50	15.2	14	10	1913	O
Chinook (1889)	126542	prop	tug	1889	Astoria, Oregon	59	18.0	21	11	1922	O
Chinook (gas 1901)	127513	prop	psgr	1903	Warrenton, Oregon	46	14.0	14	9	1913	O
City of Ainsworth	C96998	stern	psgr	1892	Ainsworth, BC	84	25.6	193	122	1898	F
City of Astoria (Note: Ex City of Sellwood.)	126544	prop	psgr	1889	East Portland, Oregon	72	21.9	56	30	1896	T-PS
City of Coos Bay (gas)	203997	prop	psgr	1907	Marshfield, Oregon	41	12.5	13	9	1907	O
City of Dixon		stern	psgr	1912	Dixon, Montana	75	22.9			1914	B
City of Ellensburgh (Note: Also seen spelled City of Ellensburg.)	126511	stern	psgr	1888	Pasco, WA	119	36.3	213	188	1907	O
City of Eugene	127330	stern	psgr	1890	Eugene, Oregon	141	43.0	347	222	1907	O
City of Frankfort (Note: Ex Traveler US #145181, renamed in 1889.)	126723	stern	psgr	1891	Clatskanie, Oregon	125	38.1	185	133	1895	N (Note: Renamed H.C. Grady, US #96316.)
City of Klamath		stern	genl	1884	Klamath Lake, Oregon						
City of Quincy	125701	stern	psgr	1878	Portland, Oregon	109	33.2	195	100	1882	T-PS
City of Ridgefield	214654	prop	frt.	1916	Ridgefield, WA	65	19.8	59	56	1916	O
City of Salem	125466	stern	psgr	1875	Portland, Oregon	1,557	474.6	457	424	1895	D
City of Sellwood	126605	prop	psgr	1883	Willamette, Oregon	72	21.9	28	21		N (Note: Renamed City of Astoria.)
City of Vancouver	206015	side	ferry	1909	St. Johns, Oregon	142	43.3	460	398	1915	O
City of Vernon		prop	genl		Okanagan Lake, BC					1890	N (Note: Renamed Mud Hen (1890))
Claggett (gas)		side	ferry	1934	Independence, Oregon	61	18.6	24		1947	A
Claire (Note: Ex Elmore)	216047	stern	psgr	1918	Portland, Oregon	157	47.9	563	486	1952	D
Clara B. (gas)	208657	prop	psgr	1910	St. Johns, Oregon	46	14.0	15	13	1915	O
Clara Parker	125915	stern	psgr	1881	Portland, Oregon	110	33.5	195	107	1890	RN (Note: Rebuilt and renamed Astorian, US #106798.)
Clatsop Chief (1875)		stern	psgr	1875	Skipanon, Oregon	58	17.7			1881	W
Clatsop Chief (1881)	125870	stern	psgr	1881	Portland, Oregon	74	22.6	102	57	1889	A
Cleona (gas)		side	ferry	1934	Hood River, Oregon	56	17.1	10		1926	A
Cleveland	125731	side	psgr	1870	Portland, Oregon	93	28.3	47	24	1888	O
Clive		stern	psgr	1879	Golden, BC				20	1887	F
Clovelly		prop	ferry	1907	Okanagan Lake, BC					1916	O
Clara B. (gas)	205399	prop	psgr	1908	Empire City, Oregon	45	13.7	13	11	1915	O
Coeur d'Alene		stern	psgr	1884	Coeur d'Alene, Idaho	124	37.8			1890	D
Colfax		prop	tow	1902	Coeur d'Alene, Idaho						
Colonel Wright		stern	psgr	1858	Deschutes, Oregon	110	33.5			1865	D
Columbia (1850)		side	genl	1850	Astoria, Oregon	90	27.4	75		1852	D
Columbia (1891)	126880	stern	psgr	1891	Little Dalles, WA	152	46.3	534	378	1894	B
Columbia (1896)	C103892	prop	tow	1896	Nakusp, BC	77	23.5	49	34	1920	D
Columbia (1902)	127689	stern	psgr	1902	Blalock, Oregon	77	23.5	159	106	1909	RN (Note: Ramed Relief, US# 203513, rebuilt in 1917.)
Columbia (gas 1905)	202757	prop	frt.	1905	Astoria, Oregon	45	13.7	14	10	1907	O
Columbia (1905)	202431	stern	psgr	1905	Wenatchee, WA	131	39.9	341	215	1915	B
Columbia (1907)	204678	stern	tow	1907	Northport, WA	61	18.6	69	41	1911	B
Columbia (1920)	C150597	prop	tow	1920	Nakusp, BC	72	21.9	90	34	1948	L
Columbia Queen		stern	genl	1891	Wenatchee, WA					1891	RN
Columbus	125869	stern	ferry	1880	Columbus, WA	80	24.4	132		1886	O
Colwell	127207	stern	psgr	1897	Ilwaco, WA	57	17.4	20	11	1907	O
Comet (1883)	126107	prop	psgr	1883	Aaronsville, Oregon	83	25.3	59	42	1902	T-CA
Comet (gas 1895)	127184	prop	psgr	1895	Astoria, Oregon	44	13.4	13	9	1907	O
Companion (gas)	202645	stern	genl	1905	Astoria, Oregon	45	13.7	14	10	1939	R
Commodore Perry	5261	prop	tow	1866	Milwaukie, Oregon	51	15.5	132		1884	
Coos	125397	side	genl	1874	Empire City, Oregon	58	17.7	53	45	1896	O
Coos River	126700	prop	genl	1890	Marshfield, Oregon	45	13.7	17	8	1907	O
Coquille	205472	prop	psgr	1908	Coquille, Oregon	77	23.5	63	46	1935	O
Corvallis		stern	snag	1877	Portland, Oregon	100	30.5	90		1896	W
Cowlitz (1857) (Note: Ex Swan.)	80026	stern	psgr	1857	Tualatin Ldng, Oregon	77	23.5			1868	RN (Note: Rebuilt and renamed Wenat, US #80026.)
Cowlitz (1917)	214769	stern	tow	1917	Portland, Oregon	103	31.4	99	72	1931	W
Crescent		stern	frt.	1891	Demersville, Montana	130	39.6			1892	W
Creston	C126231	stern	genl	1908	Nelson, BC	35	10.7	24		1920	D
Cricket		prop	psgr	1891	Portland, Oregon	90	27.4				T-PS
Curlew (gas)	200037	prop	psgr	1903	Marshfield, Oregon	41	12.5	10	8	1907	O
Cyclone (1889)		prop	psgr	1889	Astoria, Oregon	65	19.8				
Cyclone (1888)	126942	prop	ferry	1888	Albina, Oregon	76	23.2	29	19	1893	O
Cygnet (gas)		prop	genl	1910	Skaha Lake	40	12.2			1920	O
D.S. Baker	6984	stern	psgr	1879	Celilo, Oregon	165	50.3	710	566	1901	D
Daisy (1886)	157184	prop	launch	1886	Albina, Oregon	60	18.3	25	25	1887	O
Daisy (1907)		stern	l	1907	Pend Oreille, Idaho						
Daisy Ainsworth	6771	stern	psgr	1873	The Dalles, Oregon	177	53.9	673		1876	W
Daisy Andrus	157108	side	ferry	1883	Portland, Oregon	102	31.1	121	61	1896	O
Dalles		side	psgr	1862	Cascades, WA	70	21.3			1868	A
Dalles City (1891)	157315	stern	psgr	1891	Portland, Oregon	152	46.3	402	296	1910	R
Dalles City (1910)	207330	stern	psgr	1910	Portland, Oregon	151	46.0	345	284	1920	N (Note: Name changed to Diamond O., US #207330.)
Dalton		stern	psgr	1898	Port Blakely, WA	150	45.7	552		1901	N (Note: Name changed to Capital City, US #157507.)
David Campbell	211065	prop	fire	1912	Portland, Oregon	118	36.0	242	154	1929	R (Note: Reconstructed as Alaskan Native.)
Dawn			tow	1884	Astoria, Oregon					1888	F
Dayton	6618	stern	psgr	1868	Canemah, Oregon	117	35.7	202		1881	D
Defender (1903)	157699	prop	tow	1903	Newport, WA	54	16.5	28	19	1907	O
Defender (1909)		stern	tow	1909	Pend Oreille, Idaho					1909	C-B
Del Rio	213572	stern	gen	1915	Wenatchee, WA	80	24.4	189	177	1922	A
Della (gas)	157638	prop	frt.	1901	Woods, Oregon	45	13.7	30	20	1907	O
Denver		prop	tow	1896	Slocan, BC	36	11.0	9	6	1907	T
Despatch (1888)	C96986	stern	psgr	1888	Revelstoke, BC	54	16.5	37	23	1893	D
Dewdrop	157051	stern	psgr	1881	Astoria, Oregon	80	24.4	110	81	1887	D
Diamond O. (1920) (Note: Ex Fannie, US # 120685, name changed in 1906 when switched over to freight service.)	120685	stern	frt.	1887	Portland, Oregon	143	43.6	316	276	1919	A
Diamond O. (1920) (Note: Ex Dalles City, US #207330.)	207330	stern	frt.	1910	Portland, Oregon	151	46.0	345	284	1935	L.
Dirigo (gas)	200520	prop	psgr	1903	Portland, Oregon	41	12.5	12	6	1907	O
Dispatch (1888)	200081	stern	psgr	1888		54	16.5	37	24	1893	D
Dispatch (1890)	157278	stern	psgr	1890	Bandon, Oregon	93	28.3	158	107	1894	
Dispatch (1891)	157303	prop	genl	1891	Astoria, Oregon	52	15.8	25	13	1895	O
Dispatch (1903)	200081	stern	psgr	1903	Parkersburgh, Oregon	111	33.8	250	167	1923	N (Note: Renamed John Wildi; later abandoned in 1927.)
Dispatch (gas 1906)	203743	prop	psgr	1903	Marshfield, Oregon	35	10.7	8	6	1907	O
Dixie (gas)	157694	prop	psgr	1903	Marshfield, Oregon	36	11.0	8	5	1907	O
Dixie Thompson	6694	stern	psgr	1871	Portland, Oregon	155	47.2	443	296	1893	D
Dixon		stern	tow	1913	Portland, Oregon	161	49.1				
Dolphin	157183	prop	genl	1884	Astoria, Oregon	88	26.8	84	60	1893	T-PS
Don't Bother Me		side	genl	1873	Bird Island, Oregon	74	22.6			1880	D
Dora	208076	stern	psgr	1910	Randolph, Oregon	70	21.3	77	64	1927	A
Douglas (gas)	212684	stern	genl	1914	Wenatchee, WA	64	19.5	96	88	1920	W
Duchess (1886)		stern	psgr	1886	Golden, BC	60	18.3	32		1888	D
Duchess (1888)	90800	stern	psgr	1888	Golden, BC	100	30.5	146	100	1901	D
E.D. Baker		stern	psgr	1862	Vancouver, WA	160	48.8			1863	W
E.G. Bateman	207592	prop	genl	1903	St. Johns, Oregon	72	21.9	71	65	1910	O
E.L. Dwyer	136267	prop	fish	1892	Astoria, Oregon	69	21.0	54	27	1907	O
E.N. Cooke (Note: Also spelled E.N. Cook.)	8762	stern	psgr	1871	Portland, Oregon	151	46.0	416	299	1890	W
Eagle (1851)		prop	genl	1851	Philadelphia, Pennsylvania	50	15.2	20		1871	D
Eagle (gas 1903)	200019	prop	psgr	1903	Marshfield, Oregon	47	14.3	12	9	1907	O
Eagle (1905)		stern	psgr	1905	Sandpoint, Idaho	92	28.0				
Earle	221428	prop	psgr	1902	Portland, Oregon	39	11.9	8.0	5.0	1922	O
Echo (1865)	8142	stern	psgr	1865	Canemah, Oregon	122	37.2	273		1873	D
Echo (1893)	136395	stern	psgr	1893	Snohomish, WA	70	21.3	36	30		
Echo (1901)	136687	stern	psgr	1901	Coquille, Oregon	65	19.8	76	49	1910	D
Eclipse	136487	prop	tow	1889	Astoria, Oregon	68	20.7	37	25	1908	O
Edith	135292	prop	tow	1877	Portland, Oregon	79	24.1	74	37	1907	O
Egalite	136243	stern	tow	1891	Woodland, WA	76	23.2	120	82	1896	D
El Hurd	135506	prop	tow	1896	Astoria, Oregon	60	18.3	33	22	1908	O
Elathine	220306	stern	ferry	1920	Hover, WA	56	17.1	29	21		
Eleanor (gas)	214250	stern	ferry	1920	Burbank, WA	56	17.1	20	15	1924	A
Electric	135876	prop	tow	1886	Astoria, Oregon	57	17.4	33	17	1895	O
Elenore	136491	stern	psgr	1895	Portland, Oregon	160	48.8	494	468	1896	
Elf (gas)	136721	prop	psgr	1898	Astoria, Oregon	40	12.2	13	9	1907	O
Eliza Anderson	7967	side	psgr	1859	Portland, Oregon	140	42.7	276	197	1859	T-PS
Eliza Ladd	135237	stern	ferry	1875	Portland, Oregon	120	36.6	118	94	1885	D
Elk (1857)		stern	psgr	1857	Canemah, Oregon	95	29.0	60		1860	X
Elk (1864)	8776	prop	genl	1864		65	19.8	36		1878	O
Elk (1893) (Note: Ex St. Joseph.)		stern	genl	1893	Coeur d'Alene, Idaho	55	16.8	36		1900	D
Elkkader	137002	prop	psgr	1902	Portland, Oregon	61	18.6	31	21	1915	O
Ellen	213136	stern	genl	1915	Pasco, WA	63	19.2	55	42	1920	L
Elmore (1895)	136491	stern	psgr	1895	Portland, Oregon	160	48.8	493	467	1917	R (Note: Rebuilt as Claire)
Elmore (gas 1905)	202031	prop	psgr	1905	Empire City, Oregon	35	10.7	7	5	1907	O
Elsie May (gas 1899)	136745	stern	ferry	1899	Wallula, WA	40	12.2	32	13	1907	R
Elsie May (gas 1907)	204662	stern	ferry	1907	Portland, Oregon	54	16.5	26	16	1915	
Elvina	135305	prop	genl	1877	The Dalles, Oregon	92	28.0	178		1882	O
Elwood	136181	stern	psgr	1891	Portland, Oregon	154	46.9	510	420	1898	T-AK
Emily M.	136667	stern	psgr	1898	Brownsville, Oregon	32	9.8	12	9	1900	T-AK
Emma Hayward	8763	stern	psgr	1871	Portland, Oregon	177	53.9	613	456	1900	D
Enterprise (1855)		stern	psgr	1855	Canemah, Oregon	115	35.1	115		1862	D
Enterprise (1863)	8141	stern	psgr	1863	Canemah, Oregon	125	38.1	194		1875	D
Enterprise (1870)		stern	psgr	1873	Gardiner, Oregon	140	42.7	247		1873	W
Enterprise (1883)	135642	stern	psgr	1883	Astoria, Oregon	81	24.7	94	47	1892	D
Enterprise (1855)	136144	stern	psgr	1890	Portland, Oregon	106	32.3	137	137	1902	R
Enterprise (1902)	136935	stern	tow	1902	Portland, Oregon	115	35.1	333	209	1916	A
Enterprise (1903) (Note: Ex North Star, US #130967.)	130967	stern	genl	1902	Wenatchee, WA	85	25.9	129	92	1915	F
Escort (1873)	8476	prop	tow	1873	Marshfield, Oregon	88	26.8	99	50	1886	O
Escort No. 2	135572	prop	tow	1882	Coos Bay, Oregon	92	28.0	146	73	1886	O
Etna	203622	stern	genl	1906	Portland, Oregon	60	18.3	41	40	1918	L
Eugene	136424	stern	genl	1894	Portland, Oregon	140	42.7	413	250	1906	D
Eureka	135760	prop	tow	1884	East Portland, Oregon	58	17.7	21	10	1888	T-AK
Eva (1894)	136459	stern	psgr	1894	Portland, Oregon	103	31.4	131	67	1917	D
Eva (gas 1904)	200872	prop	psgr	1903	Portland, Oregon	36	11.0	10	6	1907	O
Exchange (gas)	201724	prop	frt.	1905	North Bend, Oregon	33	10.1	12	8	1907	O
Express		stern	psgr	1854	Oregon City, Oregon	111	33.8		69	1863	D
Express (gas)	204143	prop	psgr	1907	Marshfield, Oregon	43	13.1	14	10	1907	O
F.B. Jones (Note: Also seen as F.H. Jones.)	121184	stern	tow	1901	Portland, Oregon	143	43.6	303	271	1907	O
F.M. Smith (Note: Ex H.C. Grady, US #96316.)	96316	stern	psgr	1891	Portland, Oregon	125	38.1	295	244	1901	T-CA
F.P. Armstrong	C134032	stern	genl	1913	Spillimacheen, BC	81	24.7	126	79	1920	A
Fairview	C103475	stern	genl	1894	Okanagan Ldng, BC	55	16.8	43	27	1915	A
Fannie	120685	stern	tow	1887	Portland, Oregon	143	43.6	316	276	1906	RN (Note: Name changed to Diamond O., US #120685, in 1906 when rebuilt for freight service.)
Fannie Patton	9615	stern	psgr	1865	Canemah, Oregon	131	39.9	368		1880	D
Fannie Troup	9616	stern	psgr	1864	Portland, Oregon	124	37.8	229		1874	S
Fashion (Note: Rebuilt from wreck of James P. Flint.)		side	psgr	1853	Vancouver, WA	80	24.4			1864	D
Favorite (1864)				1864	Portland, Oregon			85			
Favorite (1875)	120225	prop	tow	1875	San Francisco, California	81	24.7	73	73	1895	O
Favorite (1881)	120459	prop	tow	1881	Chinook, W.T.	42	12.8	14	7.0	A	1900
Favorite (1886)	120663	prop	tug	1886	Astoria, Oregon	59	18.0	34	17	1901	O
Favorite (1901)	121136	stern	psgr	1901	Coquille, Oregon	72	21.9	63	46	1918	O
Fay No. 4 (gas)	210508	stern	psgr	1912	North Bend, Oregon	136	41.5	179	179	1913	T-CA
Fearless	9610	prop	tow	1874	San Francisco, California	85	25.9	95	45	1889	W
Fenix (Note: Ex Shoalwater.)		side	psgr	1851	Oregon City	108	32.9			1855	N (Note: Renamed Franklin.)
Ferrell		stern	genl	1906	Coeur d'Alene, Idaho						
Fire-Fly		stern	gel	1853	San Francisco, California					1854	W
Fish (gas)	200581	prop	psgr	1902	Empire City, Oregon	40	12.2	11	9	1907	O
Fleetwood	120447	prop	psgr	1881	Portland, Oregon	125	38.1	134	68	1888	T-PS
Florence		prop	tow	1939	Clarkston, WA	60	18.3	13		1947	O
Flyer (1892) (Note: Ex Yarrow.)	27641	prop	psgr	1892	Porter, Oregon	65	19.8	22	18	1915	O
Flyer (1901)	27641	prop	psgr	1901	Chelan, WA	75	22.9			1908	B
Flyer (1906)		prop	psgr	1906	Coeur d'Alene, Idaho	130	39.6			1948	L
Fool Hen		prop	psgr	1894	Fort Steele, BC					1894	D
Forty-Nine	9525	stern	psgr	1865	Colville Lndg, WA	114	34.7	219		1874	D
Franklin (Note: Ex Shoalwater, ex Fenix.)		side	psgr	1851	Oregon City	108	32.9			1857	N (Note: Renamed Minnie Holmes.)
Frederick K. Billings (1881)	120460	stern	ferry	1881	Pasco, WA	199	60.7	1,237	692	1885	R
Frederick K. Billings (1889)	120761	stern	ferry	1881	Pasco, WA	200	61.0	750	678	1900	W
Frolic			psgr	1887	Portland, Oregon					1895	O
G.K. Wentworth	202772	stern	psgr	1905	Portland, Oregon	145	44.2	325	285	1925	A
G.M. Walker	86386	stern	psgr	1897	Portland, Oregon	85	25.9	154	125	1913	N (Note: Renamed Woodland, US #86386, and then rebuilt in 1915.)
G.W. Shaver	86041	stern	psgr	1889	Portland, Oregon	140	42.7	313	276	1902	N (Note: Renamed Glenola, US #86041.)
Galena	C96983	prop	frt.	1888	Bonners Ferry, Idaho	80	24.4	73	50	1896	F
Gamecock (1898)	86418	stern	psgr	1898	Portland, Oregon	178	54.3	772	658	1910	R
Gamecock (1910)	207230	stern	psgr	1898	Portland, Oregon	160	48.8	464	406	1938	A
Gasgo (gas)	86544	prop	psgr	1900	Marshfield, Oregon	36	11.0	8	5	1907	O
Gazelle (1854)		side	psgr	1854	Canemah, Oregon	145	44.2	157		1854	X
Gazelle (1876)	85474	stern	psgr	1876	Portland, Oregon	92	28.0	157		1884	T-PS
Gazelle (gas 1905)	201750	prop	psgr	1905	Portland, Oregon	50	15.2	13	10	1907	O
Gen. J.W. Jacobs		side		1908	Portland, Oregon	126	38.4	319		1931	
Gen. Jeff C. Davis (Note: Ex Duchesnay)		side		1908	Victoria, BC	120	36.6	227		1931	
Gen’l Sheridan (gas)	203512	prop	psgr	1906	Astoria, Oregon	43	13.1	12	8	1907	O
General Canby	85414	prop	genl	1875	South Bend, WA	85	25.9	89	45	1884	T-PS
Gen. Garfield	85677	prop	genl	1883	Rainier	56	17.1	21	16	1901	O
General Miles (Note: Later Willapa and Bellingham.)	81313	prop	psgr	1882	Portland, Oregon	136	41.5	333	69	1885	N (Note: Renamed Willapa ca. 1885.)
General Sherman		prop	psgr	1884	Coeur d'Alene, Idaho					1899	D
Geo. B. Vosburg	86545	prop	psgr	1900	Portland, Oregon	76	23.2	106	66	1907	O
Geo. W. Bates (Note: Ex Paloma, US #150941.)	150941	stern	psgr	1902	Portland, Oregon	108	32.9	99	76	1935	L
Geo. E. Starr	85610	side	psgr	1879	Seattle, WA	154	46.9	473	337	1921	A
George F. Piper	C116411	prop	psgr	1904	Revelstoke, BC	78	23.8	70	48	1921	L
George W. Simons (Note: Ex Sadie B.)	116696	prop	psgr	1895	Portland, Oregon	82	25.0	84	47	1947	N (Note: <Renamed Tualatin.)
Georgiana	212280	prop	psgr	1914	Portland, Oregon	145	44.2	242	198	1937	N (Note: Renamed Lake Bonneville.)
Georgie Burton (1906) (Note: Ex Albany, ex N.S. Bentley.)	203101	stern	psgr	1906	Vancouver, WA	154	46.9	382	342	1923	R
Georgie Burton (1923)	223042	stern	psgr	1923	Portland, Oregon	154	46.9	572	455	1948	W
Georgie Oakes		stern	psgr	1890	Coeur d'Alene, Idaho	150	45.7			1927	B
Gerome	86642	stern	psgr	1902	Wenatchee, WA	81	24.7	109	74	1905	W
Gertrude (gas)	202963	prop	psgr	1906	Astoria, Oregon	39	11.9	10	7	1907	O
Gleaner	85825	prop	genl	1882	Gray's River, WA	46	14.0	14	7	1888	F
Glenola (Note: Ex G.W. Shaver, US #86041.)	86041	stern	psgr	1889	Portland, Oregon	140	42.7	313	276	1905	RN (Note: Rebuilt and renamed Beaver, US #202837.)
Gold Dust	85621	prop	genl	1884	Portland, Oregon	65	19.8	43	22	1886	O
Gold Gatherer	85176	stern	barge	1890	Whiskey Bottom, Idaho	66	20.1	40	40	1904	L
Gold Hunter		side	genl	1849	New York	172	52.4	510		1851	R (Note: Renamed Active.)
Goliah		side	genl	1849	New York	155	47.2	235		1898	
Gov. Newell	85806	stern	psgr	1883	Portland, Oregon	112	34.1	204	134	1900	D
Governor Tilden	1858	prop	genl	1877	Empire City, Oregon	65	19.8	40	26	1886	T-CA
Governor Grover	85249	stern	psgr	1873	Portland, Oregon	140	42.7	404		1880	D
Governor West (gas)	213121	stern	ferry	1915	Maryhill, WA	63	19.2	23	23	1925	R
Grace Darling (1919)		prop	ferry	1919	Okanagan Lake, BC					1919	O
Grace Darling (1923)		prop	ferry	1923	Okanagan Lake, BC	20	6.1			1963	O
Grahamona	210453	stern	psgr	1912	Portland, Oregon	150	45.7	443	413	1920	N (Note: Renamed Northwestern, US #210453.)
Granthall	C154663	prop	tow	1928	Nelson, BC	92	28.0	164	55	1958	L
Greenwood	103913	stern	psgr	1897	Okanagan Ldng, BC	143	43.6	142	90	1899	B
Grey Eagle (1894)	86300	stern	psgr	1894	Newberg, Oregon	111	33.8	218	162	1907	R
Grey Eagle (1907)	204891	stern	psgr	1907	Salem, Oregon	110	33.5	154	141	1930	A
Greyhound (1890)	86100	stern	psgr	1890	Portland, Oregon	139	42.4	180	166	1890	T-PS
Greyhound (1920)	220706	stern	psgr	1920	Kelso, WA	65	19.8	81	62	1935	L
Gwendoline	100805	stern	psgr	1893	Wasa, BC	64	19.5	91	57	1897	W
Gypsy	86325	stern	psgr	1895	Portland, Oregon	101	30.8	213	154	1900	W
H.C.Grady (Note: Ex City of Frankfort (1891).)	96316	stern	psgr	1891	Portland, Oregon	125	38.1	295	244	1895	N (Note: Renamed F.M. Smith, US #96316.)
H.M. Adams		prop	tow	1913	Astoria, Oregon	78	23.8				
Hal (gas)	96517	prop	psgr	1900	Rainier, Oregon	37	11.3	7	5	1907	O
Hardtack	212281	prop	tow	1914	Portland, Oregon	58	17.7	19	13	1915	O
Harrington (gas)	96508	prop	psgr	1902	Warrenton, Oregon	47	14.3	14	10	1907	O
Harrison		stern	psgr	1909	Coeur d'Alene, Idaho	150	45.7			1920	B
Harvest Moon	96106	stern	psgr	1889	New Era, Oregon	82	25.0	68	56	1897	D
Harvest Queen (1878)	95534	stern	psgr	1878	Celilo, Oregon	200	61.0	846	697	1899	D
Harvest Queen (1900)	96489	stern	psgr	1900	Portland, Oregon	187	57.0	733	430	1927	A
Hassalo (1857) (Note: Also spelled Hassaloe.)		side	psgr	1857	Cascades, WA	135	41.1			1865	D
Hassalo (1880)	95591	stern	psgr	1880	The Dalles, Oregon	160	48.8	462	351	1898	D
Hassalo (1899)	96440	stern	psgr	1889	Portland, Oregon	181	55.2	679	428	1927	A
Hattie (gas)	96458	prop	psgr	1897	Warrenton, Oregon	40	12.2	9	6	1907	O
Hattie Belle	96182	stern	psgr	1892	Portland, Oregon	110	33.5	207	120	1906	D
Hazel (1899)	96442	prop	psgr	1899	Portland, Oregon	45	13.7	24	19	1907	O
Hazel (gas 1905)	201831	prop	psgr	1902	Astoria, Oregon	41	12.5	12	8	1907	O
Hazel & Helen (gas) (Note: Ex Mary H. Packer, following conversion from steam to gasoline engines.)	206178	side	Frt.	1909	Astoria, Oregon	35	10.7	10	6	1930	R
Hazel Weir	203663	prop	tow	1906	Portland, Oregon	70	21.3	50	41	1915	O
Helen Hale	210697	stern	genl	1912	Kennewick, WA	100	30.5	52	33	1913	B
Helen Scott (gas)	96354	prop	psgr	1896	Warrenton, Oregon	47	14.3	11	7	1907	O
Henderson (Note: Ex M.F. Henderson, US #393168.)	210030	stern	tow	1912	Portland, Oregon	159	48.5	430	372	1956	W
Henrietta	95033	stern	psgr	1869	Sucker Lake, Oregon	54	16.5	46		1879	D
Henry J. Biddle		prop	tow	1913	St. Helens, Oregon	107	32.6				T-CA
Henry Villard		stern	ferry	1881	Sand Point, Idaho	150	45.7			1907	O
Hercules (Note: Ex Staghound, US #116823.)	96443	stern	tow	1898	Portland, Oregon	160	48.8	560	293	1935	L
Hercules	C107105	prop	tow	1898	Nelson, BC	80	24.4	65	44	1921	L
Hermina		prop	tow	1888	Portland, Oregon	67	20.4	34	22		RB (Note: Rebuilt after a fire and renamed Louise Vaughn.)
Hoo Hoo	96318	prop	psgr	1895	Portland, Oregon	51	15.5	20	16	1915	O
Hooligan		stern	frt.	1909	Klamath Falls, Oregon	80	24.4			1914	N (Note: Renamed Annie Laurie.)
Hoosier		side	genl	1851	Portland, Oregon	50	15.2	5		1853	W
Hoosier No. 2		side	genl	1855	Canemah, Oregon	40	12.2			1857	R
Hoosier No. 3 (Note: Rebuilt from Hoosier No. 2.)		side	genl	1857	Canemah, Oregon	40	12.2	27			
Hornet (gas)	201751	prop	psgr	1905	Portland, Oregon	53	16.2	11	7	1907	O
Hosmer	C126551	prop	tow	1909	Nelson, BC	110	33.5	154	105	1934	C-H
Hunter	95783	prop	tow	1883	Coos Bay, Oregon	95	29.0	104	52	1907	O
Huntress	95478	prop	psgr	1877	Puget Island, Oregon	39	11.9	18	12	1885	B
Hustler (1891)	96097	stern	tow	1891	Portland, Oregon	102	31.1	204	139	1907	O
Hustler (1908)	205178	stern	tug	1908	Portland, Oregon	65	19.8	96	73	1936	A
Hyak (1892)	C100687	stern	psgr	1892	Golden, BC	81	24.7	39	25	1906	L
Hyak (gas 1907)	203968	prop	psgr	1907	Astoria, Oregon	45	13.7	13	9	1907	O
Hydra	95422	stern	psgr	1876	St. Helens, Oregon	70	21.3	75		1882	D
Idaho (1860)	12298	side	psgr	1860	Cascades, Oregon	151	46.0	278	179	1882	T-PS
Idaho (1893)		side	psgr	1903	Coeur d'Alene, Idaho	147	44.8			1915	B
Idaho (gas 1922)	223077	prop	frt.	1922	Lewiston, Idaho	58	17.7	12	8		S
Illecillewaet	C100683	stern	genl	1892	Revelstoke, BC	78	23.8	92	62	1902	C-B
Ilwaco (Note: Ex Suomi.)	100514	prop	tug	1890	Portland, Oregon	90	27.4	196	72	1901	O
Imnaha	100796	stern	psgr	1903	Lewiston, Idaho	124	37.8	330	216	1903	W
Independence (1857)		side	psgr	1857	Monticello, WA	100	30.5			1864	D
Independence (1904)	200759	prop	psgr	1904	Independence, Oregon	54	16.5	17	16	1907	O
Independence (gas 1905)	201835	prop	psgr	1905	Astoria, Oregon	50	15.2	14	10	1907	O
India	208187	prop	tow	1910	Corvallis, Oregon	50	15.2	9	5	1915	O
Industry	100379	prop	genl	1885	Portland, Oregon	50	15.2	35	27	1887	O
Inland Chief		prop	tow	1937	Seattle, WA	191	58.2	902		1947	O
Inland Empire	205882	stern	psgr	1908	Celilo, Oregon	151	46.0	416	375	1920	N (Note: Renamed Service, US #20582.)
Inland Star	100550	prop	genl	1892	The Dalles, Oregon	42	12.8	22	17	1895	O
International	C103489	stern	psgr	1896	Kaslo, BC	142	43.3	526	281	1908	L
Interstate (Note: Ex Oregona, US #200949.)	223545	stern	psgr	1923	Vancouver, WA	132	40.2	336	308	1936	A
Invermere (gas)	C130892	prop	psgr	1912	Golden, BC	75	22.9	66		1914	O
Ione (1889)	100481	stern	psgr	1889	Portland, Oregon	130	39.6	242	213	1911	R (Note: Engines to Ione, US #209156.)
Ione (1908)	205400	stern	psgr	1908	Newport, WA	129	39.3	431	257	1910	L
Ione (1911)	209156	stern	psgr	1911	Portland, Oregon	148	45.1	389	339		
Iralda (1891)	160487	prop	psgr	1891	Portland, Oregon	90	27.4	85	37	1895	O
Iralda (1899)	100678	prop	psgr	1899	Portland, Oregon	99	30.2	99	59	1907	O
Iralda (1906)	200618	prop	psgr	1906	Portland, Oregon	106	32.3	99	50	1915	O
Iris	12299	side	psgr	1863	The Dalles, Oregon	162	49.4	402		1870	D
Irma	100543	prop	genl	1892	Hood River, Oregon	33	10.1	8	6	1895	O
Isabel (1882)	100321	stern	psgr	1882	Salem, Oregon	120	36.6	217	201	1890	W
Isabel (1908)		stern	genl	1908	Golden, BC						
Isabella McCormack	C122399	stern	genl	1908	Golden, BC	95	29.0	178	112	1910	C-H
Islander	225342	stern	tow	1926	Portland, Oregon	65	19.8	82	66	1940	L
J. Ordway	46155	stern	frt.	1876	Portland, Oregon	131	39.9	293	195	1897	D
J.A. Munroe	202632	side	pile	1905	Astoria, Oregon	62	18.9	83	57	1915	O
J.C. Post		prop	tow	1913	Astoria, Oregon	78	23.8				
J.D. Farrell	77280	stern	psgr	1897	Jennings, Montana	130	39.6	359	226	1903	D
J.M. Hannaford	77346	stern	frt.	1899	Potlatch, Idaho	169	51.5	513	456	1906	D
J.N. Teal	203949	stern	psgr	1907	Portland, Oregon	160	48.8	513	459		
James B. Stevens	76557	prop	genl	1885	Portland, Oregon	50	15.2	31	26	1907	O
James Clinton		stern	psgr	1856	Canemah, Oregon	90	27.4			1861	B
James John	204182	side	ferry	1907	St. Johns, Oregon	90	27.4	114	59	1907	O
James P. Flint		side	psgr	1851	Cascades, O.T.	80	24.4			1853	W (Note: Raised and rebuilt as Fashion (1853).)
Jane West (Note: Ex Eagle.)	75398	prop	tow	1872		50	15.2				
Jean	237246	stern	tow	1938	Portland, Oregon	140	42.7	533	311	L	1955
Jeanette		prop	launch	1881	New York	60	18.3				
Jennie Clark		side	psgr	1855	Oregon City	115	35.1	50		1863	D
Jessie		stern	genl	1887	Okanagan Ldng, BC	89	27.1			1903	B
Jessie Harkins	206018	prop	psgr	1909	Vancouver, WA	88	26.8	88	74	1920	RN (Note: Renamed Pearl)
Jim Hill		stern	snag	1910	Flathead Lake, Montana					1923	RN (Note: Rebuilt and renamed Klondike 3 (1923).)
John A. Shaw	212808	prop	tow	1914	Astoria, Oregon	83	25.3	82	56	1915	O
John F. Caples	201352	side	ferry	1904	Portland, Oregon	100	30.5	192	157	1927	A
John H. Couch	13622	side	psgr	1863	Westport, Oregon	123	37.5	255	192	1873	D
John Day Queen		stern	genl	1895	Deschutes, Oregon	40	12.2			1897	L
John Gates	76038	stern	psgr	1878	Celilo, Oregon	151	46.0	673		1994	D
John Wildi (Note: Ex Dispatch.)	200081	stern	frt.	1903	Parkersburg, Oregon	112	34.1	173	167	1927	A
Jordan	77501	prop	genl	1901	Portland, Oregon	70	21.3	90	61	1908	O
Joseph Kellogg (1881)	76267	stern	psgr	1900	Portland, Oregon	128	39.0	322	272	1900	R (Note: Rebuilt as Joseph Kellogg, US #77431.)
Joseph Kellogg (1900)	77431	stern	psgr	1900	Portland, Oregon	139	42.4	462	342	1921	N (Note: Name changed to Madeline, US #77341.)
Josie McNear	13620	side	psgr	1865	San Francisco, California	109	33.2	159	137	1878	D
Jubilee			genl	1887	Okanagan Ldng, BC	30	9.1			1889	D
Julia (1858) (Note: Also known as Julia Barclay.)	13621	stern	psgr	1858	Port Blakely, W.T.	147	44.8	325		1878	D
Julius (gas)	205210	stern	ferry	1909	Salem, Oregon	61	18.6	48	48	1911	L
Juneta	207430	prop	psgr	1910	Portland, Oregon	36	11.0	10	6	2014	O
Juno (1876)	75802	prop	launch	1876	Coos Bay, Oregon	57	17.4	22	15	1895	O
Juno (1902) (Note: Ex Pend Oreille (refitted and enlarged).)		stern	psgr	1902	Pend Oreille, Idaho	57	17.4				
Juno (1906)	203654	prop	psgr	1906	Marshfield, Oregon	61	18.6	32	20	1915	O
Kaleden No. 1 (gas) (Note: Ex Mallard (1908).)		prop	genl	1908	Okanagan Lake, BC	30	9.1			1910	O
Kalenden No. 2	C130027	stern	tow	1910	Okanagan Ldng, BC	94	28.7	180	113	1916	L
Kamloops No. 1		prop	genl	1872	Shuswap Lake, BC						
Kalso (1892)	C96999	prop	tow	1892	Kaslo, BC	62	18.9	51	35	1910	B
Kalso (1900)	C107827	stern	psgr	1900	Nelson, BC	174	53.0	765	370	1910	S
Katie Cook	14345	prop	tow	1876	Coquille River, Oregon	58	17.7	39	20	1887	O
Katie Hallett		stern	genl	1882	Clark Fork, Idaho	135	41.1			1885	D
Katie Ladd		side	genl	1871	Portland, Oregon	90	27.4	110		1878	
Kehani	161034	stern	genl	1892	Portland, Oregon	90	27.4	118	85	1905	RN (Note: Rebuilt and renamed Ottawa, US #202283.)
Kelowna (1902)	C111780	prop	tow	1902	Kelowna, BC	78	23.8	65		1916	D
Kelowna (1920)	C150271	prop	tow	1920	Okanagan Ldng, BC	89	27.1	96	34	1956	L
Kelowna-Westbank	C153323	prop	ferry	1927	Okanagan Lake, BC	85	25.9	105		1939	D
Kiyus (Note: Also spelled Cayuse.)		stern	psgr	1863	Celilo, Oregon	140	42.7			1866	W
Klahowya	C126946	stern	psgr	1910	Golden, BC	92	28.0	175	111	1915	L
Klamath	202570	prop	psgr	1914	Klamath Falls	75	22.9	69		1925	A
Klihyam	205787	prop	tow	1908	Bandon, Oregon	90	27.4	125	55	1915	O
Klondike No. 2		stern	genl	1909	Flathead Lake, Montana	120	36.6			1924	D
Klondike No. 3		stern	genl	1923	Flathead Lake, Montana						
Klondyke		stern	genl	1900	Flathead Lake, Montana					1909	L
Kokanee	C103305	stern	psgr	1896	Nelson, BC	146	44.5	348	165	1923	L
Koos (gas)	204104	prop	psgr	1907	Marshfield, Oregon	39	11.9	10	7	1907	O
Kootenai	14436	stern	genl	1892	Little Dalles, WA	139	42.4	371	269	1895	D
Kootenay	C103164	stern	psgr	1897	Nakusp, BC	139	42.4	1117	732	1920	L
Kuskanook	C121758	stern	psgr	1906	Nelson, BC	194	59.1	1,008	548	1931	L
L.E. Thompson		prop	tow	1913	Portland, Oregon	60	18.3				
L.P. Hosford	230901	prop	tow	1931	Portland, Oregon	145	44.2	680	529	1938	N (Note: Renamed Indian.)
La Camas (Note: Ex Tom Morris.)		prop	genl	1900							
La Center	209642	stern	frt.	1912	La Center, WA	65	19.8	67	64	1931	A
Lake Bonneville (Note: Ex Georgiana.)	212280	prop	psgr	1914	Portland, Oregon	145	44.2	242	198	1940	A
Latona	140344	stern	psgr	1878	Portland, Oregon	90	27.4	129	74	1892	D
Lavelle Young	141529	stern	psgr	1898	Portland, Oregon	140	42.7	506	396	1920	D
Leader (gas)	203343	prop	frt.	1906	Ilwaco, WA	54	16.5	13	9	1907	O
Lena	140762	stern	launch	1884	Sauvie's Island, Oregon	42	12.8	31	16	1895	D
Leona (1901) (Note: Ex McMinnville.)	141710	stern	psgr	1901	Portland, Oregon	105	32.0	145	136	1912	B
Leona (gas)	202362	prop	psgr	1905	Portland, Oregon	50	15.2	12	8	1907	O
Leonore (gas)	200913	prop	psgr	1904	Portland, Oregon	47	14.3	13	7	1907	O
Lequime (gas)	200913	prop	ferry	1947							
Lewiston (1867)	1737	stern	genl	1867	Umatilla, Oregon	83	25.3	78		1869	F
Lewiston (1894)	141361	stern	genl	1894	Riparia, WA	165	50.3	513	487	1905	R
Lewiston (1905)	202007	stern	genl	1905	Riparia, WA	166	50.6	548	518	1922	B
Lewiston (1923)	223498	stern	genl	1923	Linnton, Oregon	160	48.8	581	422	1940	N (Note: Renamed Barry K US #223498. prior to 1942 transfer to Alaska.)
Lexington (gas)	202777	prop	frt.	1906	Astoria, Oregon	49	14.9	14	10	1907	O
Libby		prop	psgr	1894	Fort Steele, BC					1895	L
Liberty (1889)	141017	prop	genl	1889	Bandon, Oregon	65	19.8	61	39	1895	O
Liberty (1901)	200083	stern	psgr	1901	Bandon, Oregon	91	27.7	174	120	1918	A
Lidie and Marie (gas)	141791	prop	frt.	1902	Warrenton, Oregon	46	14.0	14	10	1907	O
Life-Line (gas)		prop	psgr	1914	Coos Bay, Oregon	40	12.2			1923	W
Lillian	140584	prop	genl	1883	Rainier, Oregon	55	16.8	18	9	1888	T-AK
Lionel R. Webster	201330	side	ferry	1904	Portland, Oregon	139	42.4	343	264	1915	O
Little Annie	140220	stern	psgr	1876	Myrtle Creek, Oregon	70	21.3	86	73	1890	W
Lizzie	141808	prop	tow	1902	Portland, Oregon	60	18.3	45	31	1915	O
Lizzie Linn		side	ferry	1883	Wallula, WA	35	10.7	23		1887	R
Lizzie Linn		side	ferry	1887	Wallula, WA	58	17.7	39		1892	B
Lloyd-Jones		prop	ferry	1950	Okanagan Lake, BC						
Logger (Note: Ex Olympian, ex Telegraph both US #200012.)	224389	stern	tow	1925	St. Helens, Oregon	156	47.5	447	322	1938	W
Lorelei	141427	stern	genl	1895	Lewiston, Idaho	38	11.6	8	7	1898	D
Lot Whitcomb		side	psgr	1851	Milwaukie, Oregon	160	48.8	600	1851	1854	T-CA
Louise (gas)	11692	prop	frt.	1901	Warrenton, Oregon	46	14.0	13	9	1907	O
Louise Vaughn (Note: Ex Hermina.)	140975	prop	tow	1888	Portland, Oregon	67	20.4	34	22	1890	T-WA
Loyal Ellsworth		stern	psgr	1864						1868	O
Lucea Mason	140603	stern	psgr	1883	St. Helens, Oregon	109	33.2	178	140	1891	W
Luckiamute Chief	140975	prop	psgr	1878	Salem, Oregon	80	24.4	69		1879	D
Lurline No.1	140341	stern	psgr	1878	Willamette, Oregon	158	48.2	481	338	1917	RB
Lurline No.2	215058	stern	psgr	1917	Portland, Oregon	152	46.3	406	318	1931	D
Lytton	C94095	stern	psgr	1890	Revelstoke, BC	131	39.9	452	285	1904	D
M.F. Henderson	93168	stern	psgr	1901	Portland, Oregon	159	48.5	534	315	1911	W
Mabel	92839	stern	frt.	1898	Huntington, Oregon	70	21.3	59	49	1899	D
Madeline (Note: Ex Joseph Kellogg, US#72431.)	77431	stern	psgr	1900	Portland, Oregon	139	42.4	408	336	1929	A
Magnet		prop	genl							1881	O
Maja	93295	prop	tow	1902	Hood River, Oregon	54	16.5	32	22	1907	N (Note: Renamed Alarm (1907).)
Mallard (gas 1908)		prop	genl	1908	Okanagan Lake, BC	30	9.1			1910	N (Note: Renamed Kaleden No. 1 after transfer to Skaha Lake, BC.)
Mallard (gas 1914)		prop	genl	1914	Okanagan Lake, BC	32	9.8				W
Manzanillo (Note: Also spelled Manzanilla.)	91373	stern	psgr	1881	Portland, Oregon	110	33.5	217	130	1893	D
Margey	91779	stern	psgr	1885	East Portland, Oregon	104	31.7	118	98	1900	T-PS
Marguerite	92912	prop	psgr	1898	Florence, Oregon	64	19.5	44	34	1915	O
Maria (1858)		stern	psgr	1858	Fraser River, BC	127	38.7			1864	D
Maria (1887) (Note: Ex Vancouver, US # 25835.)	91960	stern	tow	1887	Portland, Oregon	115	35.1	203	185	1923	A
Maria G. Haaven	91647	prop	gel	1883	Portland, Oregon	48	14.6	26	13	1889	T-AK
Maria Wilkins	90423	stern	genl	1872	Portland, Oregon	77	23.5	97		1882	D
Marie	213150	prop	ferry	1914	Wallula, WA	41	12.5	11	8	1918	O
Marion	C94801	stern	psgr	1888	Golden, BC	61	18.6	15	9	1901	W
Marten		prop	genl	1866	Shuswap Lake, BC						
Mary (1854)		side	psgr	1854	Cascades, WA	80	24.4			1858	D
Mary (1871)		prop	genl	1871	Coquille River, Oregon					1872	D
Mary D. Hume	91304	prop	misc	1881	Gold Beach, Oregon	98	29.9	140	83	1970	A
Mary Bell	90141	side	psgr	1865	Cascades, W.T.	103	31.4	138		1873	D
Mary H. Packer		side	Frt.	1909	Astoria, Oregon	35	10.7	10	6	1911	N (Note: Renamed Hazel & Helen (1911) and repowered with gasoline engines.)
Mary Hall	91553	prop	genl	1882	Oneatta, Oregon	36	11.0	11	6	1895	O
Mary Moody		stern	genl	1866	Idlewild Bay, Idaho	108	32.9			1876	D
Mary Victoria Greenhow		prop	genl	1866	Okanagan Lake, BC	32	9.8			1887	B
Mascot (1890)	92253	stern	psgr	1890	Portland, Oregon	132	40.2	267	199	1908	R
Mascot (1908)	204927	stern	psgr	1908	Portland, Oregon	141	43.0	299	258	1911	B
Mata C. Hover (gas)	203918	stern	psgr	1906	Hover, WA	61	18.6	14	10	1910	L
Mathloma (1896)		stern	snag	1896	Portland, Oregon	134	40.8	270		1906	R
Mathloma (1906)		stern	snag	1906	Portland, Oregon	160	48.8	177		1927	L
Maude Moore		prop	genl	1899	Skaha Lake, BC	45	13.7			1911	O
Mayflower (1891)	92345	prop	psgr	1891	Astoria, Oregon	66	20.1	48	24	1895	O
Mayflower (gas 1902)	93293	prop	psgr	1902	May, Oregon	37	11.3	8	6	1907	O
Mayflower (gas 1905)	202128	prop	psgr	1905	Portland, Oregon	38	11.6	12	9	1907	O
Mayflower (gas 1908)	210275	prop	psgr	1908	Newport, WA	51	15.5	14	10	1915	O
Mazama		prop	psgr	1908	Klamath Falls, Oregon	50	15.2			1920	A
McMinnville (1899)	92959	stern	psgr	1899	Portland, Oregon	90	27.4	137	102	1912	RN (Note: Rebuilt and renamed Leona, US #141710.)
Melville		prop	genl		Portland, Oregon					1908	O
Merrimac			tow							1874	O
Messenger (1873)		stern	psgr	1873	Marshfield, Oregon	91	27.7	136		1879	B
Messenger (1891)	92388	stern	psgr	1891	Portland, Oregon	100	30.5	126	95	1896	B
Meta (gas)	93372	prop	psgr	1903	Astoria, Oregon	44	13.4	14	10	1907	O
Metaline (Note: Rebuilt from Pend Oreille.)	92664	stern	psgr	1895	Newport, WA	108	32.9	218	159	1895	W
Metlako (Note: Ex Bonita (1890).)	3839	stern	psgr	1900	Portland, Oregon	109	33.2	198	122	1925	N (Note: Renamed B.H. Smith, Jr.)
Michigan	91830	prop	genl	1885	Portland, Oregon	62	18.9	43	21	1887	T-PS
Mikado	91826	prop	launch	1886	Portland, Oregon	46	14.0	13	6	1889	T-PS
Millacoma	206650	stern	psgr	1909	Marshfield, Oregon	55	16.8	14	12	1915	O
Milton	92185	prop	genl	1890	Porter, Oregon	45	13.7	24	12	1895	O
Milwaukie			ferry	1887		50	15.2	37		1895	
Mink	92673	prop	psgr	1895	Florece, Oregon	37	11.3	14	9	1907	O
Minnehaha	90084	stern	psgr	1866	Oswego Lake, Oregon	70	21.3	104		1876	D
Minnie Hill	91742	prop	psgr	1884	Portland, Oregon	44	13.4	13	7	1895	O
Minnie Holmes (Note: Ex Shoalwater, ex Fenix, ex Franklin.)		side	psgr	1855	Oregon City, Oregon	108	32.9	49		1858	D
Minnie Miller	91501	prop	psgr	1883	Tillamook, Oregon	52	15.8	25	14	1887	O
Minnie Mitchell (gas)	202820	prop	psgr	1905	Marshfield, Oregon	35	10.7	8	6	1907	O
Minto	C107453	stern	psgr	1898	Nakusp, BC	162	49.4	829	522	1954	L
Missoula		stern	psgr	1866	Thompson Rpds, Montana	93	28.3			1876	D
Modoc (1889)	92103	stern	psgr	1889	Portland, Oregon	142	43.3	372	338	1898	R
Modoc (1898)	92898	stern	psgr	1898	Portland, Oregon	155	47.2	480	354	1916	T-PS
Mollie	90742	prop	genl	1874	Elk City, Oregon	58	17.7	38	38	1895	O
Monarch (Note: Ex Charles R. Spencer, US #127574)	127574	stern	psgr	1901	Portland, Oregon	181	55.2	598	409	1914	T-CA
Montesano	91400	stern	psgr	1882	Astoria, Oregon	80	24.4	113	87	1907	O
Moose		stern	psgr	1859	Canemah, Oregon	75	22.9			1861	W
Mountain Buck (1857)		side	psgr	1857	Portland, Oregon	133	40.5			1864	D
Mountain Buck (1888)	91980	prop	genl	1888	Nasel, WA	50	15.2	32	19	1895	O
Mountain Gem	2010195	stern	psgr	1904	Lewiston, Idaho	150	45.7	469	282	1924	A
Mountain Queen	90939	stern	psgr	1877	The Dalles, Oregon	176	53.6	719	511	1889	T-PS (Note: Renamed Sehome and rebuilt as sidewheeler after transfer to Puget Sound.)
Mountaineer	91545	prop	genl	1882	Chinook, W.T.	69	21.0	73	48	1895	O
Moyie	C107454	stern	psgr	1898	Nelson, BC	162	49.4	834	575	2017	M
Mudhen (1878)		stern	genl	1878	Coquille River, Oregon	33	10.1			1892	
Mudhen (1890) (Note: Ex City of Vernon.)		prop	genl	1890	Okanagan Lake, BC					1896	D
Multnomah (1851)		side	psgr	1851	Oregon City, Oregon	108	32.9			1864	D
Multnomah (1885)	91765	stern	psgr	1885	East Portland, Oregon	143	43.6	313	278	1889	T-PS
Multnomah (1906)	203158	prop	psgr	1906	Portland, Oregon	71	21.6	42	34	1907	O
Multnomah (1913)			dredge	1913	Portland, Oregon	269	82.0	1,135			
Muskrat		stern	snag	1892	Golden, BC	84	25.6	380	265		
Myrtle (1878)	90925	prop			Empire City, Oregon	50	15.2	21		1878	O
Myrtle (1887)		prop			Marshfield, Oregon					1887	O
Myrtle (1908)	205908	prop	tow	1908	Prosper, Oregon	73	22.3	78	53	1915	O
Myrtle (1909)	206743	stern	psgr	1909	Portland, Oregon	57	17.4	36	29	1922	A
Mystic	203888	prop	psgr	1907	Astoria, Oregon	51	15.5	30	20	1907	O
N.R. Lang (Note: Ex Salem, US #115778)	230884	stern	psgr	1900	Portland, Oregon	152	46.3	528	381	1940	D
N.S. Bentley	130364	stern	psgr	1886	Portland, Oregon	151	46.0	432	401	1896	RN (Note: Rebuilt and renamed Albany, US #107218.)
Nahcotta	130793	prop	psgr	1896	Portland, Oregon	96	29.3	149			
Naiad	130961	prop	tow	1895	Portland, Oregon	55	16.8	11	8	1907	O
Nakusp	C103302	stern	psgr	1895	Nakusp, BC	171	52.1	1083	832	1897	B
Naomi	130717	stern	genl	1896	Wallula, WA	43	13.1	10	7	1899	L
Naramata	C134271	prop	tow	1914	Okanagan Ldng, BC	90	27.4	150	74	2017	M
Nasookin	C133885	stern	psgr	1913	Nelson, BC	200	61.0	1,869	1,035	1947	L
Nellie (1879)	130149	stern	psgr	1879	Salem, Oregon	50	15.2	47		1882	D
Nellie (1882)	130347	prop	launch	1882	Columbus, WA	49	14.9	14	7	1887	O
Nellie (1899)	130819	stern	tow	1899	Portland, Oregon	115	35.1	180	59	1907	O
Nellie & Cressy (gas)	131010	prop	psgr	1903	Bandon, Oregon	33	10.1	12	8	1907	O
Nelson	C96987	stern	psgr	1891	Nelson, BC	134	40.8	496	312	1913	L
Nespelem	215759	stern	tow	1917	Wenatchee, WA	131	39.9	349	292	1920	N (Note: Name changed to Robert Young, US #215759.)
Nestor	130998	stern	tow	1902	Caitlan, WA	82	25.0	133	78	1929	A
Netsick (gas)	130831	prop	tow	1899	Astoria, Oregon	31	9.4	9	7	1907	O
Newport (1907)	203874	stern	psgr	1907	Newport, WA	92	28.0	129	81	1910	D
Newport (1908)	205273	prop	psgr	1908	Yaquina City, Oregon	72	21.9	77	54	1930	A
New Tenino	130067	stern	psgr	1876	Celilo, Oregon	146	44.5	462		1879	D
New Volunteer	130926	stern	psgr	1901	Newport, WA	72	21.9	105	73	1908	C-H
New Western Queen	130773	side	ferry	1898	The Dalles, Oregon	76	23.2	99	74	1915	O
New World	18357	side	psgr	1849	New York	225	68.6	531		1867	T-PS
New York	130312	prop	ferry	1884	Portland, Oregon	56	17.1	22	14	1895	O
Nez Perce Chief	18399	stern	psgr	1863	Celilo, Oregon	126	38.4	327		1874	D
No Wonder	130458	stern	genl	1889	Portland, Oregon	135	41.1	270	235	1930	A
Nola (gas)	131018	prop	psgr	1902	Astoria, Oregon	35	10.7	11	8	1907	O
Norma	130787	stern	psgr	1902	Bridgeport, Idaho	160	48.8	488	452	1915	A
Norman	200541	prop	tow	1903	Portland, Oregon	69	21.0	60	28	1904	O
North Bank	204183	prop	frt.	1907	The Dalles, Oregon	81	24.7	80	49	1907	O
North King	130904	prop	tow	1901	Portland, Oregon	80	24.4	80	40	1907	O
North Star (1897)	130739	stern	genl	1908	Jennings, Montana	130	39.6	380	265	1903	L
North Star (1902)	130967	stern	genl	1902	Wenatchee, WA	85	25.9	129	95	1907	R
North Star (gas 1905)	202539	prop	psgr	1905	Marshfield, Oregon	35	10.7	10	8	1907	O
North Star (1907)	204761	stern	genl	1907	Wenatchee, WA	100	30.5	198	125	1915	B
Northwest (1877)	130101	stern	psgr	1877	Portland, Oregon	124	37.8	356	275	1885	D
Northwest (1889)	130459	stern	psgr	1889	Portland, Oregon	135	41.1	324	301	1907	T-AK
Northwestern (Note: Ex Grahamona, US #210453.)	210453	stern	psgr	1912	Portland, Oregon	150	45.7	443	413	1939	T-AK
Novelty		prop	tow	1884	North Bend, Oregon					1895	O
No Wonder	130458	stern	tow	1889	Portland, Oregon	135	41.1	269	235	1933	A
Nowitka	C130604	stern	tow	1911	Golden, BC	81	24.7	113	62	1920	L
OCRR Ferry No. 1		side	ferry	1870	Portland, Oregon	180	54.9	658		1880	
OCRR Ferry No. 2	155011	side	ferry	1879	East Portland, Oregon	123	37.5	414	256	1898	T-CA
O.K.	155139	prop	genl	1887	Astoria, Oregon	62	18.9	63	48	1895	O
Oakes		stern	frt.	1892	Flathead Lake, Montana	1,892	576.7			1892	W
Oaks Flyer (gas)	204039	prop	psgr	1907	Portland, Oregon	78	23.8	12	12	1908	O
Ocean Wave	155207	side	psgr	1891	Portland, Oregon	180	54.9	724	507	1899	T-CA
Occident (1875)	19448	stern	psgr	1875	Portland, Oregon	154	46.9	587	430	1891	D
Occident (gas)	155403	prop	tow	1901	Astoria, Oregon	35	10.7	10	7	1907	O
Ocklahama (1876)	19471	stern	psgr	1876	Portland, Oregon	162	49.4	582	394	1897	R
Ocklahama (1897)	155310	stern	tow	1897	Portland, Oregon	162	49.4	676	565	1930	A
Ohio	19419	stern	psgr	1874	Portland, Oregon	140	42.7	347		1981	D
Okanagan (1888) (Note: Ex Red Star. Later in career known as Lucy and also Red Star again.)		prop	genl	1888	Okanagan Lake, BC	53	16.2			1913	L
Okanagan (Can. 1907)	C122379	stern	psgr	1907	Okanagan Ldng, BC	193	58.8	1,078	679	1934	L
Okanagan (1947)		prop	tow	1947	Okanagan Ldng, BC	102	31.1	204	139	1972	L
Okanagon (1861)	19153	stern	psgr	1861	Deschutes, Oregon	118	36.0	278		1876	D
Okanogan (US 1907)	204319	stern	psgr	1907	Wenatchee, WA	137	41.8	432	255	1915	B
Olympian (1883)	155089	side	psgr	1883	Wilmington, Delaware	262	79.9	1,419	1.083	1906	W
Olympian (1903) (Note: Ex Telegraph, transferred to Columbia River from Puget Sound in 1920.)	200012	stern	psgr	1903	Everett, WA	154	46.9	386	243	1924	A
Oneatta (1872)	19357	side	psgr	1872	Pioneer City, Oregon	82	25.0	34	21	1881	R
Oneatta (1881)		stern	psgr	1881	Portland, Oregon	90	27.4			1882	T-CA
Oneonta	19151	side	psgr	1863	Celilo, Oregon	150	45.7	497		1877	D
Onward (1858)	19154	stern	psgr	1858	Canemah, Oregon	120	36.6	120		1865	D
Onward (1867)	19374	stern	psgr	1867	Tualatin Ldng, Oregon	98	29.9	155		1880	D
Orchard City	133779	prop	frt.	1912	Kelowna, BC	87	26.5	107		1944	D
Oregon (1852)		side	psgr	1851	Oregon City	120	36.6			1864	W
Oregon (1899)	155347	side	ferry	1899	Arlington, Oregon	48	14.6	39	21	1915	O
Oregona	200949	side	psgr	1904	Portland, Oregon	132	40.2	370	281	1924	RB (Note: Rebuilt and renamed Interstate, U.S. registry #223545.)
Orient	19449	stern	psgr	1875	Portland, Oregon	154	46.9	587	430	1894	F
Oro	155285	stern	psgr	1896	Wenatchee, WA	84	25.6	103	42	1898	L
Orondo Ferry (gas)	225272	side	ferry	1925	Orondo, WA	51	15.5	21	19	1935	
Oswego	155079	prop	genl	1883	Portland, Oregon	57	17.4	43	21	1895	O
Ottawa (Note: Ex Kehani (rebuilt in 1905).)	202283	stern	tow	1905	Portland, Oregon	89	27.1	77	72	1920	A
Otter	19407	stern	psgr	1874	Portland, Oregon	87	26.5	119	104	1875	T-PS
Owyhee	19152	stern	psgr	1864	Celilo, Oregon	124	37.8	313		1876	D
Paloma	150941	stern	psgr	1902	Portland, Oregon	108	32.9	137	115	1919	N (Note: Renamed Geo. W. Bates, US #150941.)
Panama	214696	stern	ferry	1914	White Salmon, WA	52	15.8	15		1922	T-Mex
Pasco-Burbank Ferry (gas)	214397	stern	ferry	1916	Pasco, WA	58	17.7	37	37	1922	A
Pastime (gas)		stern	genl	1900	Coquille, Oregon	45	13.7	11		1901	
Pearl	150762	prop	tow	1897	Portland, Oregon	45	13.7	10	8	1907	O
Pearl (Note: Ex Jessie Harkins)	206018	prop	psgr	1909	Vancouver, WA	88	26.8	88	74	1958	D
Pedler	205068	stern	frt.	1908	Marshfield, Oregon	124	37.8	407	350	1910	T-CA
Pend Oreille (1884)		side	psgr	1884	Lk. Pend Oreille, Idaho	90	27.4			1895	N (Note: Renamed Metaline, US #92664.)
Pend Oreille (1900)		stern	psgr	1900	Sandpoint, Idaho	140	42.7			1902	N (Note: Refitted and renamed Juno.)
Pendozi		prop	ferry	1939		147	44.8				
Penticton		prop	genl	1890	Okanagan Lake, BC	147	44.8			1902	D
Pentona		side	genl	1853	Portland, Oregon	81	24.7				
Pentowna	C153253	prop	genl	1926	Kelowna, BC	122	37.2	145		1973	D
Pert (Note: Ex Alert. Unpowered bateau until 1890.)	C107826	side	genl	1887	Golden, BC	50	15.2	7	4	1905	A
Petrel	150943	prop	tow	1902	Portland, Oregon	37	11.3	13	8	1907	O
Pilgrim	150662	prop	psgr	1893	Portland, Oregon	72	21.9	38	28	1897	O
Pioneer		side	psgr	1866	Milwaukie, Oregon	98	29.9			1873	D
Plymouth	223789	stern	ferry	1924	Pasco, Oregon	55	16.8	30	20	1928	A
Pomona (1898)	150782	stern	psgr	1898	Portland, Oregon	134	40.8	365	295	1926	R
Pomona (1926)	226079	stern	psgr	1926	Portland, Oregon	120	36.6	216	183	1940	D
Portland (1853)		side	psgr	1853	Portland, Oregon	90	27.4			1857	W
Portland No. 1	20309	side	ferry		Portland, Oregon	101	30.8	107		1880	
Portland (1875)	150024	prop	tow	1875	Portland, Oregon	60	18.3	32	16	1890	T-PS
Portland (1919)	218331	stern	tow	1919	Portland, Oregon	185	56.4	801	683	1947	R
Portland (1947)	253590	stern	tow	1947	Portland, Oregon	219	66.8	928	733	1981	M
Power City (gas)		stern	genl	1910	American Falls, Idaho	65	19.8			1915	L
Powers	206261	stern	gene	1906	North Bend, Oregon	90	27.4	99	67	1926	A
Procter (Note: Ex Kaslo.)	C96999	prop	tow	1900	Nelson, BC	65	19.8	43	29	1921	L
Pronto	203020	stern	tow	1906	Portland, Oregon	100	30.5	94	72	1935	L
Ptarmigan	C111950	stern	tow	1903	Golden, BC	110	33.5	247	155	1909	D
Puritan	150392	prop	frt.	1887	Portland, Oregon	68	20.7	25	14	1887	O
Queen (1892)	20605	prop	psgr	1892	Astoria, Oregon	64	19.5	47	24	1908	O
Queen (gas 1903)	20640	prop	psgr	1903	Astoria, Oregon	50	15.2	14	10	1908	O
Queen (gas 1906)	208245	stern	psgr	1908	Portland, Oregon	38	11.6	14	4	1908	O
Queen (gas 1907)	204119	prop	tow	1908	Marshfield, Oregon	44	13.4	13	10	1908	O
Queen (gas 1915)	213485	prop	frt.	1915	The Dalles, Oregon	63	19.2	49	49	1924	A
Quickstep (1877)	116470	stern	psgr	1877	Portland, Oregon	50	15.2	12		1887	T-PS
R.C. Young	110996	stern	psgr	1892	Salem, Oregon	83	25.3	108	85	1892	B
R.P. Elmore	110856	prop	psgr	1890	Astoria, Oregon	67	20.4	114	57	1922	O
R.R. Thompson	110367	stern	psgr	1878	The Dalles, Oregon	215	65.5	1,158	912	1904	D
R. Miler	110898	prop	psgr	1891	Astoria, Oregon	68	20.7	71	41	1907	O
Rabboni		prop	tow	1865	San Francisco	100	30.5	49		1869	T-PS
Rainbow	209654	stern	psgr	1912	Marshfield, Oregon	64	19.5	75	58	1923	D
Rainier	5687	stern	psgr	1867	Rainer, Oregon	82	25.0	110		1868	RB (Note: Rebuilt and renamed Carrie, US #5687.)
Ramona (1892)	110964	stern	psgr	1892	Portland, Oregon	100	30.5	177	114	1896	R
Ramona (1896)	111130	stern	psgr	1896	Portland, Oregon	118	36.0	251	201	1898	T-AK
Ranger	21603	stern	psgr	1865	Portland, Oregon	113	34.4	199		1878	O
Rattler	110627	prop	ferry	1884	Ainsworth, WA	76	23.2	52	41	1904	
Rattlesnake (gas) (Note: Ex Orillia.)		prop	ferry	1906	Okanagan Lake, BC	36	11.0	12	9	1911	O
Rebecca C.	110598	prop	genl	1883	South Beach, Oregon	61	18.6	16	10	1898	
Red Star		prop	genl	1890	Shuswap River, BC	33	10.1			1898	N (Note: Renamed Okanagan.)
Regulator (1891)	110935	stern	psgr	1891	Portland, Oregon	152	46.3	434	335	1899	R
Regulator (1899)	110935	stern	psgr	1899	Portland, Oregon	157	47.9	508	308	1906	X
Reliance	21600	stern	psgr	1865	Canemah, Oregon	141	43.0	316		1871	D
Relic		prop	genl	1883						1895	O
Relief (1859		stern	psgr	1859	Linn City, Oregon	110	33.5	97		1865	D
Relief (gas 1901)	200563	prop	psgr	1901	Marshfield, Oregon	31	9.4	9	7	1907	O
Relief (1901) (Note: Ex Columbia, US #127689.)	203513	stern	psgr	1906	Blalock, Oregon	118	36.0	214	209	1931	A
Relief (1916)	214263	stern	genl	1916	Coquille, Oregon	64	19.5	44	37	1927	
Republic	111254	prop	psgr	1899	Portland, Oregon	89	27.1	88	60		
Rescue	21601	stern	psgr	1859	Monticello, W.T.	95	29.0	126	95	1878	D
Resolute (1870)	110006	stern	tow	1870	Portland, Oregon	57	17.4	51		1872	X
Resolute (1887)	110747	prop	tow	1887	Mill No. 4, Oregon	104	31.7	91	44		T-PS
Resolute (1900)	111273	prop	tow	1900	Portland, Oregon	52	15.8	24	12	1907	O
Restless (1876)	110291	stern	psgr	1876	Gardiner, Oregon	71	21.6	101	86	1895	
Restless (1887)	110741	prop	genl	1887	Parkersburg, Oregon	45	13.7	10	5	1893	O
Restless (gas 1904)	201098	prop	psgr	1904	Astoria, Oregon	36	11.0	7	5	1907	O
Reta	111226	prop	psgr	1899	Prosper, Oregon	53	16.2	26	18	1915	D
Revelstoke	C111777	stern	psgr	1902	Nakusp, BC	127	38.7	309	179	1915	B
Rip Van Winkle	110321	prop	psgr	1877	Astoria, Oregon	56	17.1	42	21	1881	T-PS
Rival	21602	stern	psgr	1860	Oregon City	111	33.8	211		1868	D
Robert Young (Note: Ex Nespelem.)	215759	stern	tow	1917	Wenatchee, WA	131	39.9	349	292	1935	W
Rogue River	111381	stern	tow	1901	Portland, Oregon	66	20.1	80	50	1902	W
Roosevelt	221647	side	ferry	1921	North Bend, Oregon	96	29.3	197	134	1939	
Rosebery (1923)	C154588	prop	tow	1923	Rosebery, BC	102	31.1	133	52	1943	R
Rosebery (1943)	C	prop	tow	1943	Rosebery, BC	98	29.9	166	80	1956	L
Rose City (gas)	205191	prop	genl	1908	Portland, Oregon	38	11.6	7	5	1911	O
Rosetta		prop	genl							1881	O
Rossland	C107142	stern	psgr	1897	Nakusp, BC	183	55.8	884	532	1918	S
Rough	204626	stern	genl	1907	Ainsworth, WA	53	16.2	17	10	1908	L
Rowena Lyle (gas)	221619	side	ferry	1921	Rowena, WA	49	14.9	14	9	1928	
Ruby (gas)	201718	prop	psgr	1905	Astoria, Oregon	44	13.4	10	6	1907	O
Rush		side	ferry	1889	Hood River, Oregon	40	12.2	12		1895	
Rustler (1882)	110525	stern	psgr	1882	Portland, Oregon	78	23.8	90	58	1892	B
Rustler (1896)	111113	stern	psgr	1896	Jennings, Montana	124	37.8	258	196	1896	W
Ruth (1893)	111155	stern	genl	1893	San Francisco, California	41	12.5	14	10	1907	
Ruth (1895)	111103	stern	tow	1895	Portland, Oregon	156	47.5	515	388	1917	W
Ruth (1896)	111103	stern	genl	1896	Libby, Montana	131	39.9	315	275	1897	W
Ruth (1908)	205786	stern	psgr	1908	Newport, WA	116	35.4	274	173	1910	L
S.G. Reed	115620	stern	psgr	1878	Portland, Oregon	175	53.3	809	607	1894	D
S. Schmidt & Co. (gas)	115620	stern	frt.	1902	Astoria, Oregon	45	13.7	14	10	1907	O
S.S. Hodge No. 1		stern	frt.	1945	Polson, Montana	100	30.5			1956	D
S.S. Hodge No. 2		stern	frt.	1956	Polson, Montana						
S.T. Church	115514	stern	psgr	1876	Portland, Oregon	154	46.9	556	396	1884	D
St. Claire		side	psgr	1859	Rays Ldng, Oregon	80	24.4			1865	D
St. Johns	209839	side	ferry	1912	Portland, Oregon	125	38.1	379	338	1923	A
St. Joseph		stern	psgr	1893	Coeur d'Alene, Idaho	100	30.5			1894	N (Note: Renamed Elk.)
St. Paul	203615	stern	psgr	1906	Trinidad, WA	116	35.4	208	131	1915	B
Sadie B.	110606	prop	psgr	1895	Portland, Oregon	80	24.4	54	33	1896	O
Salem	115578	stern	psgr	1881	Portland, Oregon	150	45.7	351	240	1900	RN (Note: Rebuilt and renamed N.R. Lang, US #230884.)
Salem Ferry No. 2	115136	side	ferry	1876	Salem, Oregon	50	15.2	38		1882	
Salem Ferry No. 3	115768	side	ferry	1881	Salem, Oregon	66	20.1	55	36	1887	O
Sam	115538	prop	genl	1877	Astoria, Oregon	45	13.7	15		1887	
Sandon	C107451	prop	tow	1898	Rosebery, BC	76	23.2	97	66	1927	D
Sarah Dixon (1892)	116470	stern	psgr	1892	Portland, Oregon	145	44.2	310	279	1906	RB
Sarah Dixon (1906)	203009	stern	psgr	1906	Portland, Oregon	161	49.1	368	334	1935	A
Sarah Hoyt (Note: Ex Gazelle.)		side	psgr	1855	Portland, Oregon	145	44.2			1855	N (Note: Renamed Señorita.)
Saretta	201046	prop	psgr	1903	Newport, Idaho	54	16.5	34	23	1907	O
Satellite	115380	prop	genl	1872	Empire City, Oregon	90	27.4	105		1877	O
Seaside	116092	prop	tow	1885	Portland, Oregon	45	13.7	31	19	1885	O
Sedalia	115221	prop	tow	1873	Astoria, Oregon	60	18.3	44		1877	O
Selkirk (1895)	C103299	stern	genl	1895	Kamloops, BC	62	18.9	59	37	1917	A
Selkirk (1899)	116884	stern	psgr	1899	Wenatchee, WA	111	33.8	223	172	1906	W
Senator	23148	stern	psgr	1864	Milwaukie, Oregon	132	40.2	298		1875	X
Señorita		side	psgr	1855	Oregon City, Oregon	145	44.2			1859	D
Seon	209510	prop	tow	1911	Newberg, Oregon	64	19.5	55	36	1915	O
Service (Note: Ex Inland Empire, US #205882, renamed Service in 1920.)	205882	stern	psgr	1908	Celilo, Oregon	151	46.0	416	375	1930	A
Shaver (1927)	205179	stern	tow	1908	Portland, Oregon	155	47.2	368	305	1927	R
Shaver	205179	prop	tow	1927	Portland, Oregon	313	95.4	423	256	1947	O
Shoalwater		side	psgr	1851	Oregon City	108	32.9			1853	N (Note: Renamed Fenix)
Shoo Fly	23975	stern	psgr	1871	Canemah, Oregon	126	38.4	317		1878	D
Shoshone (1866)	23961	stern	psgr	1866	Canemah, Oregon	122	37.2	273		1874	W
Shoshone (1908)	209110	stern	psgr	1908	Coeur d'Alene, Idaho	55	16.8	11	7	1912	O
Sicamous	C134276	stern	psgr	1914	Okanagan Ldng, BC	201	61.3	1,787	984	2017	M
Silver City		stern	frt.	1936	Polson, Montana	100	30.5			1943	S
Skedaddle		stern	genl	1862	Portland, Oregon	60	18.3			1869	D
Skookum (gas 1906) (Note: Also known as Tut Tut.)		prop	ferry	1906	Okanagan Lake, BC	30	9.1			1911	O
Skookum (gas 1912)		prop	ferry	1912	Okanagan Lake, BC	50	15.2			1913	S
Slocan (1897)	C103668	stern	psgr	1897	Rosebery, BC	156	47.5	578	364	1905	R
Slocan (1905)	C121680	stern	psgr	1905	Rosebery, BC	158	48.2	605	338	1927	L
Snake River (gas)	216046	stern	ferry	1918	Ainsworth, WA	52	15.8	13	10	1941	A
Sol Thomas	23961	prop	tow	1866	Philadelphia, Pennsylvania					1887	O
Spallumcheen (Note: Also known as Noisy Peggy.)	C85313	stern	genl	1872	Shuswap Lake, BC	80	24.4	118		1889	L
Speilei	212809	stern	tow	1914	St. Helens, Oregon	76	23.2	75	65	1940	A
Spieler	207602	stern	genl	1906	Ridgefield, WA	61	18.6	36	36	1915	L
Spokane (1877)	115577	stern	psgr	1877	Celilo, Oregon	150	45.7	673	532	1899	R
Spokane (1888)	116876	stern	psgr	1888	Riparia, WA	150	45.7	676	408	1899	R
Spokane (1891)	116557	stern	psgr	1891	Bonners Ferry, Idaho	104	31.7	115	111	1893	R
Spokane (1893)	100684	stern	psgr	1893	Bonners Ferry, Idaho	126	38.4	400	252	1895	B
Spokane (1903)	117250	stern	psgr	1903	Newport, Idaho	132	40.2	357	231	1922	A
Spray	23147	stern	psgr	1862	Deschutes, Oregon	116	35.4	235		1869	D
Staghound	116823	stern	psgr	1898	Portland, Oregon	178	54.3	772	658	1898	W
Star (Note: Ex Norman.)	200541	prop	tow	1903	Portland, Oregon	69	21.0	60	28	1915	O
Stark Street Ferry	115747	side	ferry	1881	Portland, Oregon	139	42.4	231	231	1897	
Stark Street Ferry No. 7	116022	side	ferry	1884	Portland, Oregon	139	42.4	299	299	1897	
State of Idaho	116557	stern	psgr	1893	Bonners Ferry, Idaho	141	43.0	341	273	1893	W
State of Montana		stern	psgr	1891	Polson, Montana	150	45.7			1892	W
State of Washington	116272	stern	psgr	1889	Tacoma	175	53.3	605	449	1920	X
Stehekin (Note: Ex Columbia Queen.)		stern	genl	1892	Lake Chelan, WA	72	21.9			1905	D
Stranger (1903)	117239	prop	tow	1903	Portland, Oregon	73	22.3	85	51	1915	O
Stranger (1928)	227888	stern	tow	1928	Portland, Oregon	130	39.6	358	312	1939	D
Success (1877)	23717	stern	psgr	1868	Canemah, Oregon	131	39.9	344		1877	D
Success (gas 1903)	200344	prop	psgr	1903	Gold Beach, Oregon	45	13.7	14	9	1907	
Sue H. Elmore	116997	prop	genl	1900	Portland, Oregon	91	27.7	232	131	1919	T-PS
Suomi	100514	prop	tug	1890	Portland, Oregon	90	27.4	196	72	1891	N (Note: Renamed Ilwaco.)
Surprise		stern	psgr	1857	Canemah, Oregon	130	39.6	120		1864	D
Swallow	23775	stern	psgr	1867	Canemah, Oregon	45	13.7	33		1877	D
Swan (1857)	80026	stern	psgr	1857	Tualatin Ldng, Oregon	77	23.5			1857	N (Note: Renamed Cowlitz, US #80026.)
Swan (1870)		stern	psgr	1870	Gardiner, Oregon	90	27.4	131		1880	
Swan (1916)			barge	1916	Portland, Oregon	125	38.1	538		1940	
T.J. Potter (1888)	145489	side	psgr	1888	Portland, Oregon	234	71.3	659	590	1900	R
T.J. Potter (1900)	145489	side	psgr	1900	Portland, Oregon	234	71.3	1107	676	1921	A
T.M. Richardson	145490	prop	psgr	1888	Oneatta, Oregon	64	19.5	36	25	1908	D
Tacoma (1884)	145382	prop	ferry	1884	Portland, Oregon	334	101.8	1,362	1,311	1916	T-PS
Tahoma (1900)	145842	stern	psgr	1900	Portland, Oregon	118	36.0	261	154	1910	R
Tahoma (1910)	207182	stern	psgr	1910	Portland, Oregon	118	36.0	192	146	1928	A
Teaser	145002	prop	psgr	1874	The Dalles, Oregon	69	21.0	52		1875	T-PS
Teddy Roosevelt (gas)	203053	prop	psgr	1906	Astoria, Oregon	45	13.7	14	10	1907	O
Telegraph (1903) (Note: Later named Olympian.)	1200013	stern	psgr	1903	Portland, Oregon	154	46.9	386	243	1924	A
Telegraph (1914)	212094	stern	psgr	1914	Prosper, Oregon	103	31.4	96	63	1940	A
Telephone No. 1	145400	stern	psgr	1885	Portland, Oregon	172	52.4	386	334	1887	B
Telephone No. 2	145477	stern	psgr	1887	Portland, Oregon	200	61.0	500	443	1903	R
Telephone No. 3	200263	stern	psgr	1903	Portland, Oregon	202	61.6	794	539	1909	T-CA
Telephone (gas)	145909	prop	psgr	1903	Marshfield, Oregon	36	11.0	7	5	1907	O
Tenino	124491	stern	psgr	1861	Deschutes, Oregon	135	41.1	329		1869	N (Note: Rebuilt as New Tenino, U.S. registry #130067.)
The Dalles (Note: <Ex Undine (1921), renamed 1935.)	221499	stern	psgr	1921	Portland, Oregon	170	51.8	516	485	1940	D
Thomas L. Nixon	145494	stern	psgr	1888	Pasco, W.T.	160	48.8	516	477	1901	D
Three Sisters	145423	stern	psgr	1886	East Portland, Oregon	141	43.0	355	327	1896	D
Tioga (gas)	204101	prop	psgr	1907	North Bend, Oregon	40	12.2	11	8	1907	O
Toledo (1878)	145186	stern	psgr	1878	Portland, Oregon	109	33.2	202	143	1885	R
Toledo (1885)	145186	stern	psgr	1885	Portland, Oregon	128	39.0	226	207	1896	W
Tom Morris	145328	prop	genl	1883	Rainier, Oregon	55	16.8	19	10	1900	RB (Note: Rebuilt and renamed La Camas.)
Tongue Point (gas)	214854	stern	dredge	1911	Portland, Oregon	65	19.8	87	87	1931	A
Tonquin	145459	prop	frt.	1887	Astoria, Oregon	64	19.5	91	53	1915	O
Topsy	145413	stern	psgr	1885	Corvallis, Oregon	59	18.0	30	28	1893	D
Torpedo					Lake Coeur d'Alene				1891	T	
Trail	C103306	stern	psgr	1896	Nakusp, BC	165	50.3	663	418	1890	B
Transfer (gas)	204750	stern	ferry	1907	Allegany, Oregon	28	8.5	8	6	1921	
Transfer (gas 1907)		stern	ferry	1907	North Bend, Oregon	36	11.0	14		1911	
Transfer (gas 1908)	205735	stern	ferry	1908	Marshfield, Oregon	60	18.3	38	24	1935	
Traveler	145181	stern	psgr	1878		124	37.8	238	145	1889	N (Note: Renamed as City of Frankfort.)
Trepanier (gas)		prop	ferry	1912	Okanagan Lake, BC					1913	O
Tressa May (Note: Ex Robert G. Ingersoll.)	145364	prop	psgr	1883	East Portland, Oregon	57	17.4	49	40	1888	D
Triton (gas)	203902	prop	tndr	1907	Astoria, Oregon	38	11.6	10	7	1907	O
Triumph	145536	prop	genl	1889	Parkersburgh, Oregon	64	19.5	56	28	1915	O
Truant	206932	prop	genl	1910	Toledo, Oregon	53	16.2	33	29	1935	O
Tum Tum (Note: Possibly the same vessel as Skookum alias Tut Tut.)		prop	ferry		Okanagan Lake, BC						
Twin Cities	205912	stern	psgr	1908	Celilo, Oregon	110	33.5	91		1931	A
Tyone (gas)	201752	prop	psgr	1905	Portland, Oregon	53	16.2	11	7	1907	O
Typhoon (1889)	145547	prop	psgr	1889	Portland, Oregon	75	22.9	71	48	1890	T-PS
U.S. Grant		prop		1866	Brooklyn, Oregon	60	18.3	47		1871	W
Umatilla (1858) (Note: Ex Venture.)		stern	psgr	1858	Cascades, W.T.	110	33.5	91		1868	T-BC
Umatilla (gas 1908)	207024	stern	psgr	1908	Plymouth, WA	59	18.0	14	9	1927	A
Umatilla (1908)		stern	dredge	1908	Celilo, Oregon	160	48.8	481	300	1942	A
Umatilla (1928)	327556	stern	tow	1928	Celilo, Oregon	160	48.8	551	532	1941	W
Uncle Richard	25260	prop	genl	1885	Portland, Oregon	40	12.2	13	11	1893	O
Uncle Sam	208344	stern	genl	1911	Corvallis, Oregon	81	24.7	82	76	1915	L
Undine (1887)	25266	stern	psgr	1887	Portland, Oregon	150	45.7	327	280	1921	R
Undine (1921)	221499	stern	tow	1921	Portland, Oregon	170	51.8	516	485	1935	N (Note: Renamed The Dalles, US #221499.)
Unio		stern	psgr	1861	Canemah, Oregon	96	29.3	112		1861	N (Note: Name changed to Union.)
Union (1861) (Note: Ex Unio.)	25165	stern	psgr	1861	Canemah, Oregon	96	29.3	112		1869	D
Union (1883)		prop	genl	1883	East Portland, Oregon					1888	T-AK
Valhalla	111541	prop	tow	1901	Nelson, BC	103	31.4	153	34	1931	C-S
Valley Queen	161824	stern	genl	1898	Independence, Oregon	86	26.2	92	73	1899	D
Vancouver (1857)		side	psgr	1857	Milwaukie, O.T.	84	25.6	41		1870	R
Vancouver (1870)	25835	stern	psgr	1870	Vancouver, W.T.	95	29.0	91		1885	RN (Note: Rebuilt and renamed Maria, US # 91960.)
Vancouver (1893)	161717	side	ferry	1893	Portland, Oregon	108	32.9	211	157	1895	O
Vanguard	161873	prop	tow	1901	Astoria, Oregon	65	19.8	75	51	1915	O
Varuna No. 1	25799	prop	psgr	1869	Port Orchard, W.T.	75	22.9	37.23		1880	W
Varuna No. 2	25846	prop	psgr			75	22.9	39.18		1878	O
Venture		stern	psgr	1885	Cascades, W.T.	110	33.5	91		1858	W
Venus	161884	prop	psgr	1901	Coquille, Oregon	39	11.9	15	9	1915	O
Vernon (gas)	161943	prop	psgr	19033	Astoria, Oregon	48	14.6	13	9	1907	O
Veto No. 1	125962	side	ferry	1879	Portland, Oregon	85	25.9	75	39	1887	B
Veto No. 2	25977	side	ferry	1880	Portland, Oregon	90	27.4	116	116	1892	
Victoria (1899)	C107530	stern	psgr	1899	Trout Lake City, BC	75	22.9	107	67	1906	D
Victoria (1909)	206524	stern	psgr	1909	Independence, Oregon	63	19.2	42	37	1913	L
Viking	206017	prop	psgr	1909	Astoria, Oregon	45	13.7	9	6	1915	O
Virginia V	222170	prop	psgr	1922	Lisabuela	110	33.5	122	83	1943	T-PS
Volante	161689	prop	genl	1888	Oneatta, Oregon	76	23.2	74	44	1896	B
Volga (1888)	161594	prop	fish	1888	Astoria, Oregon	48	14.6	19	10		T-PS
Volga (1894)	161727	prop	psgr	1894	Portland, Oregon	67	20.4	74	51	1907	O
Volunteer (1889)		prop	psgr	1889	Portland, Oregon					1895	O
Volunteer (1900)	161832	stern	psgr	1900	Footner, WA	51	15.5	40	25	1905	L
Vulcan	161698	stern	genl	1892	Portland, Oregon	144	43.9	328	220	1914	A
W.H. Harrison	81291	prop	psgr	1890	Alsea, Oregon	50	15.2	92	53	1905	W
W.H. Pringle	81773	stern	psgr	1901	Pasco, W.T.	166	50.6	575	507	1906	W
W.R. Todd	203141	stern	psgr	1906	Ainsworth, WA	112	34.1	172	108	1912	W
W.S. Ladd			dredge	1893	Portland, Oregon					1895	O
W.S. Mason	81559	side	ferry	1894	Portland, Oregon	122	37.2	322	252	1915	O
Wahkiakum			dredge	1913	Portland, Oregon	269	82.0	1,135			
Wallamet		side	psgr	1853	Canemah, Oregon	150	45.7			1854	T-CA
Wallowa (1889)	81233	prop	tow	1889	Portland, Oregon	112	34.1	184	92	1893	O
Wallowa (1904)		stern	dredge	1904	Riparia, WA	125	38.1	175		1914	D
Wallulah (gas)	214711	stern	genl	1914	Corvallis, Oregon	81	24.7	98	95	1919	A
Walluski	81149	prop	genl	1887	Astoria, Oregon	65	19.8	77	65	1895	O
Wanderer		prop	genl	1896	Okanagan Lake, BC	40	12.2			1896	D
Wanista No.1 (gas)	205245	stern	ferry	1908	Ainsworth, WA	58	17.7	34	29		
Wanista No.2 (gas)	214711	stern	ferry	1917	Kennewick, WA	56	17.1	53	42	1927	A
Wasco (1855)		side	psgr	1855	Cascades, W.T.					1861	
Wasco (1887)	81168	prop	psgr	1887	Hood River, Oregon	135	41.1	250	215	1900	T-PS (Note: Renamed Bay City.)
Washington (1851)		prop	psgr	1851		40	12.2	20		1857	X
Washington (1881)	80815	stern	psgr	1881	Vancouver, WA	142	43.3	292	193.08	1882	T-PS
Washington (gas 1903)	81849	prop	psgr	1903	Marshfield, Oregon	37	11.3	7	5	1907	O
Wasp (1867)			genl	1867						1874	O
Wasp (1914)			genl	1914	Klamath Lake, Oregon	50	15.2				
Water Witch			genl	1893	Portland, Oregon					1896	O
Wauna (1893)		prop	genl	1893	Portland, Oregon	35	10.7			1897	O
Wauna (1906)	203573	stern	tow	1906	Portland, Oregon	118	36.0	149	134	1937	A
Web Foot No. 1	26714	stern	psgr	1863	Celilo, Oregon	150	45.7	504		1871	D
Web Foot No. 2	90100	stern	psgr	1866	Portland, Oregon	50	15.2	32			
Welcome (1874)	80537	stern	psgr	1874	Portland, Oregon	127	38.7	327	251	1881	T-PS
Welcome (1900)	81707	stern	psgr	1900	Coquille, Oregon	56	17.1	30	21	1907	W
Wenat (Note: Ex Swan, ex Cowlitz (1857).)	80026	stern	psgr	1868	Portland, Oregon	77	23.5	87		1878	T-PS
Wenatchee	81671	stern	psgr	1899	Wenatchee, WA	79	24.1	77	48	1901	B
Wenona	81196	prop	genl	1888	Astoria, Oregon	64	19.5	51	35	1895	O
Weown	203994	stern	tow	1907	St. Johns, Oregon	154	46.9	372	319	1938	A
Western Queen	80724	side	ferry	1879	Portland, Oregon	72	21.9	95	75	1898	
Westport	80676	side	genl	1878	Westport, Oregon	118	36.0	204	154	1886	B
Whatshan (Note: Ex Mogul.)	C126552	stern	psgr	1909	Nakusp, BC	90	27.4	106	72	1920	D
Wide West	80650	stern	psgr	1877	Portland, Oregon	218	66.4	1201	929	1888	W
Wildwood	81022	prop	psgr	1884	Rainier, Oregon	67	20.4	53	27	1885	T-PS
Wilhelmina (gas)	204869	stern	frt.	1907	Lewiston, Idaho	59	18.0	13	8	1910	L
Willamette		side	psgr	1853	Canemah, Oregon	150	45.7			1854	T-CA
Willamette Chief (1874)	80405	stern	psgr	1874	Portland, Oregon	163	49.7	586		1878	RB
Willamette Chief (1878)	80701	stern	psgr	1878	Portland, Oregon	163	49.7	693	524	1894	B
Willamette Squaw	80519	stern	psgr	1875	Willamette, Oregon	75	22.9			1880	L
Willapa (Note: Ex General Miles.)	81313	prop	psgr	1882	Portland, Oregon	136	41.5	334	250	1894	T-AK (Note: Later renamed Bellingham.)
William Hunter	C100690	prop	psgr	1892	New Denver, BC	59	18.0	51	35	1900	
Wilson G. Hunt	26713; C83455	side	psgr	1845	New York	185	56.4	461	350	1878	T-BC
Winema		stern	psgr	1905	Klamath Falls, Oregon	110	33.5	125		1925	A
Wm. M. Hoag	81171	stern	psgr	1889	East Portland, Oregon	150	45.7	452	431	1903	RN (Note: Rebuilt and renamed Annie Commings.)
Wolverine (gas)	204972	prop	psgr	1908	Coos Bay, Oregon	50	15.2	14	10	1935	T-CA
Wonder	80648	stern	genl	1877	Portland, Oregon	131	39.9	320	226	1888	D
Woodland (1913) (Note: Ex G.W. Walker, US #86386.)	86386	stern	psgr	1897	Portland, Oregon	85	25.9	154	125	1915	R (Note: Rebuilt by U.S. Corps of Engineers after 1913 acquisition.)
Woodland (1915)		stern	genl	1915	Portland, Oregon	97	29.6			1929	A
Yakima (1864)	27551	stern	psgr	1864	Celilo, Oregon	150	45.7	455		1876	W
Yakima (1906)	20552	stern	psgr	1906	Ainsworth, WA	137	41.8	393		1924	A
Yamhill (1860)	27552	stern	psgr	1860	Canemah, Oregon	76	23.2	72		1878	O
Yarrow	27641	prop	genl	1890	Porter, Oregon	63	19.2	43	32	1893	O (Note: Renamed Flyer by 1915.)
Ymir	C107452	prop	tow	1890	Nelson, BC	78	23.8	70	47	1929	L
York	C111979	prop	psgr	1902	Okanagan Ldng, BC	88	26.8	134	91	1932	A
Young America	27650	prop	genl	1890	Portland, Oregon	88	26.8	79	42	1895	O
Yukon (1895)	27670	stern	genl	1895	Rufus, Oregon	48	14.6	33	17	1904	
Zephyr (gas)	202951	prop	gel	1906	Astoria, Oregon	38	11.6	10	7	1897	O

== See also ==
=== Museum vessels ===
- Moyie (sternwheeler), museum vessel in Kalso, BC
- Naramata (steam tug), museum vessel in Penticton, BC
- Portland (sternwheeler), operational museum vessel in Portland, Oregon
- Sicamous (sternwheeler), museum vessel in Penticton, BC
- Virginia V, last operational wooden-hulled steamship on west coast, in Seattle, WA
- W.T. Preston (sternwheel snagboat), museum vessel in Anacortes, WA

=== Companies ===
- Canadian Pacific Railway Lake and River Service
- Ilwaco Railway and Navigation Company
- Oregon Steam Navigation Company
- Shaver Transportation Company

=== Other ===
- List of rapids of the Columbia River
- Shipwrecks of the Inland Columbia River
- Tourist sternwheelers of Oregon (replica steamboats in the 21st century)
