= Little Annie (steamboat) =

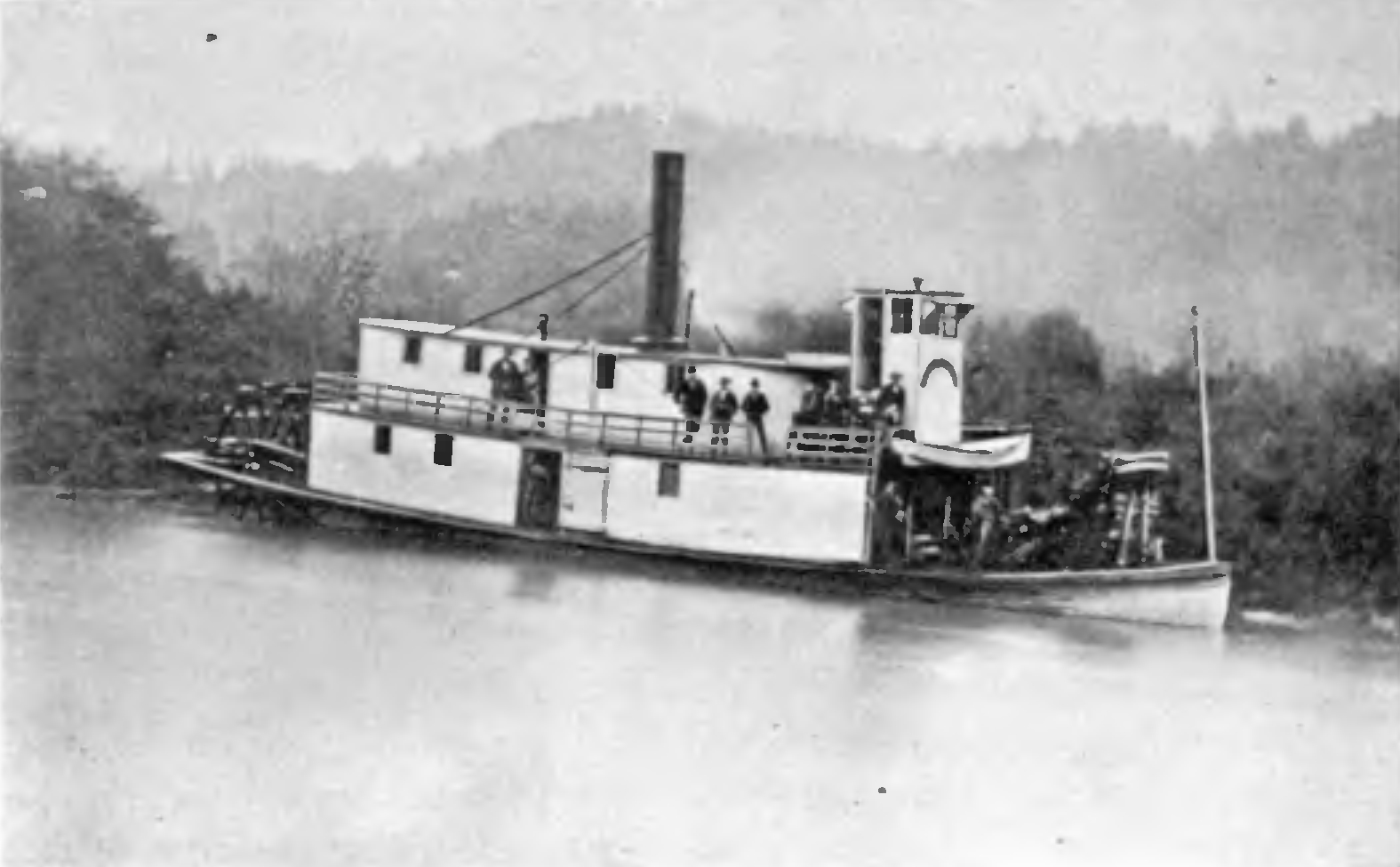
- Little Annie

History
- Name: Little Annie
- Port of registry: Coos Bay, Oregon
- In service: 1876
- Out of service: 1890
- Identification: U.S. 140220
- Fate: Struck rock and sank for total loss.

General characteristics
- Type: Inland passenger
- Tonnage: 85.56 gross tons, 72.73 net tons
- Length: 69.5 ft (21.18 m) over the hull
- Beam: 16.4 ft (5.00 m)
- Depth: 2.2 ft (0.67 m) depth of hold
- Installed power: twin steam engines, horizontally mounted
- Propulsion: stern wheel

Little Annie was a sternwheel-driven steamboat that operated on the Coquille River on the Southern Oregon Coast from 1876 to 1890. This steamer should not be confused with a number of other vessels with the same name operating at about the same time in various parts of the United States.

== Construction ==
William E. Rackleff (or Rackliff) (1834-1909) built Little Annie at or near his residence, the same one he occupied in 1898, at Myrtle Creek, Oregon. Charles Edgar Edwards (b. 1851) worked with W.E. Rackleff to build Little Annie, and in 1878, he was made engineer of the boat.

Although the Myrtle, a propeller-driven steamboat from San Francisco, had operated on the Coquille River in 1875 under the command of Capt. John Abbot, it drew too much water and was reported to have been badly managed. Little Annie, launched the next year, was the first steamer to provide successful service in the Coquille River region.

== Specifications ==
Sternwheel steamers were generally measured over the hull, rather than over the deck, which meant that the extension on the stern to accommodate the stern wheel was not included in the official registered length of the vessel. As measured over the hull, Little Annie measured 69.5 ft (21.18 m), a beam of 16.4 ft (5.00 m) and depth of hold of 2.2 ft (0.67 m). The boat's overall size was 85.56 gross tons and 72.73 net tons. The official merchant vessel registry number was 140220. In 1878, Little Annie's home port (the place where the vessel's official documentation was kept) was Empire City, Oregon.

== Ownership and personnel ==
A large number of steamboat men in the Coos Bay area gained their experience on Little Annie. In 1882, Charles E. Edwards took over command of Little Annie from William E. Rackliff. Subsequent masters included Levi Snyder (b. 1859), Jabez Hall, and George W. Leneve (b. 1851). Little Annie had a number of owners and persons with legal interests in the boat at various times including J.H. Giles, E.G. Flanagan, Olaf Reed, H.W. Dunham, and R.J. Dunham.

== Operations ==
On December 27, 1879, Little Annie, then owned by Rackliff, had been out of service for ten days for repairs. The steamer reported to be "probably again running" as of December 27, 1879. On January 3, 1880, Little Annie was reported to be back in service on the boat's regular trips.

On May 1, 1880, it was reported that Little Annie had "resumed her trips on the Coquille river" the previous Friday. Capt. Graves took over command of Little Annie in May, 1880, although Rackleff remained the owner. Just after Graves took over, the boat failed, on Friday, May 24, and Wednesday, May 29, 1880, to make its regular trips, with no reason specified in the source.

In June 1880, Little Annie was chartered by the U.S. government to transport a party from the Corps of Engineers who were inspecting the Coquille River to evaluate a request from the local citizens to expend $10,000 to improve the navigability of the river. As of December 4, 1880, Little Annie had resumed service on the Coquille River under the command of Capt. C.E. Edwards. Edwards had previously commanded Little Annie.

In 1884, two steamers operated on the Coquille River, Little Annie and the propeller-driven Ceres. The total number of people served by the steamers was about 2,000. Little Annie and Ceres made alternate trips between Bandon and Myrtle Point, Oregon, stopping at the many landings along the river. The total length of the trip one way was 40 miles (64 km), and it took a day to make it. The boats would return the next day.

On March 6, 1884, Little Annie was reported to be out of service. Little Annie's captain, J. Yager, had transferred over to the steamer Ceres, where he took the place of J. Mack as engineer.

A teacher's institute was held at the Marshfield Academy in Marshfield (now called Coos Bay) on Wednesday and Thursday, September 24 and 25, 1884. Arrangements were made with Little Annie, the steamers Ceres and Coos, the Isthmus Transit Railroad, and the Coquille and Coos Bay Stage Line to carry teachers to and from the institute at half rates.

On March 26, 1885, Levi Snyder became captain of Little Annie.

During the fiscal year ending June 30, 1890, Little Annie averaged two trips a week between Bandon and Coquille City, Oregon.

== Loss ==
At the end of the fiscal year ending on June 30, 1890, Little Annie struck a rock near Bandon and sank. The steamer was a total loss.

== See also ==
- Steamboats of the Coquille River
