= Grey Eagle (sternwheeler) =

- Grey Eagle (on left) at Salem, Oregon.

History
- Name: Grey Eagle
- Route: Willamette and Yamhill rivers.
- In service: 1894
- Out of service: 1930
- Identification: US registry #86300 (1894-1907); #204891 (1907-1930)
- Fate: Abandoned

General characteristics
- Tonnage: 218 grt; 162 rt (1894-1907); 154 grt; 141 rt (1907-1930)
- Length: 111 ft (34 m)
- Beam: 21 ft (6 m)
- Depth: 4.7 ft (1 m) depth of hold
- Installed power: twin horizontally mounted high-pressure single-cylinder steam engines.
- Propulsion: sternwheel

Grey Eagle was a wooden sternwheel-driven steamboat that operated on the Willamette and Yamhill rivers in the United States from 1894 to 1930. In 1903 Grey Eagle became the last commercial steamboat to run upriver to Junction City, Oregon.

== Design and construction ==
Grey Eagle (also seen spelled Gray Eagle) was built on the Yamhill River at Newberg, Oregon in 1894 for the shipping firm of Fuller, Kemp & Cook. The vessel's dimensions were 111 feet (34 m) long, with a 21-foot (6.4 m) beam, 4.7-foot (1.4 m) depth of hold, 218 gross and 162 registered tons. The steamboat was driven by a sternwheel which was turned by two twin horizontally mounted high-pressure steam engines. Each engine had a cylinder diameter of 10 inches (250 mm) and a bore stroke of 36 inches (910 mm), generating 6 nominal horsepower. Grey Eagle's original steamboat registry number was 86300.

== Operations ==
Grey Eagle was used to tow logs in the Salem area in the late 1890s. In 1903, under Capt. Arthur Riggs, Grey Eagle became the last commercial steamboat to run up the Willamette River to the landing at Junction City, Oregon. After this, aside from an occasional log tow, no steamboat operated any further upriver than Corvallis.

In 1907, Grey Eagle was rebuilt into a towboat at Salem by M. J. Jones for Salem Towing & Transportation Co. The vessel was smaller following the rebuild, at 154 gross and 141 registered tons. The post-rebuild official registry number was 204891. In the late 1920s, the vessel was operated by the Charles K. Spaulding Logging Co. in towing work on the Willamette in the Salem area.

== Disposition ==
Grey Eagle was abandoned in 1930.
