= Nahcotta (steamship) =

American steamship

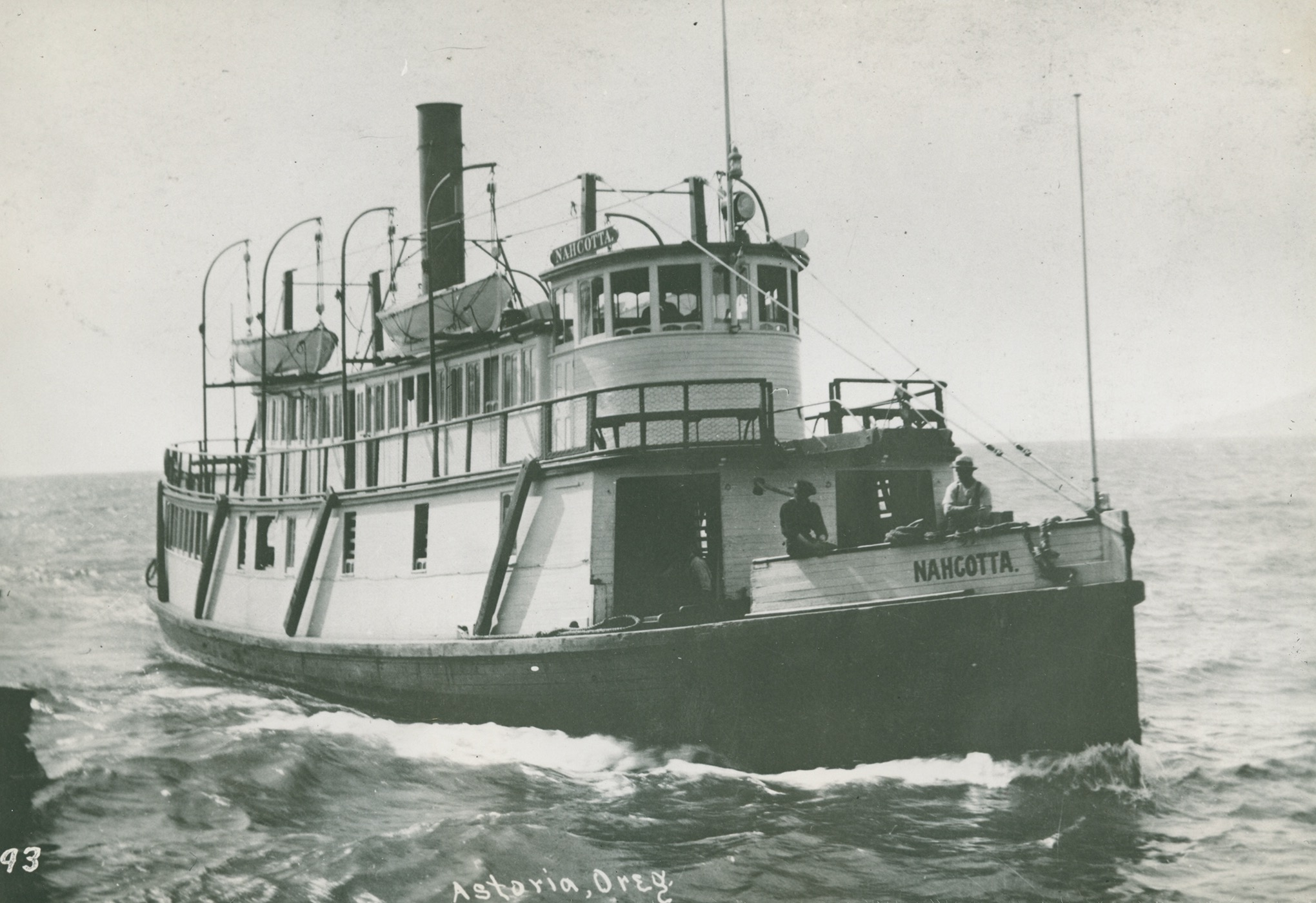
- Nahcotta circa 1910

History
- Name: Nahcotta
- Owner: Oregon Railway & Nav. Co.
- Route: Lower Columbia and Willapa Bay
- In service: 1898
- Out of service: 1928
- Identification: U.S. 130793
- Fate: Partially dismantled, converted to floating fish store

General characteristics
- Type: inland steamship
- Tonnage: 149 GRT; 112 NRT
- Length: 96 ft (29.3 m)
- Beam: 20.1 ft (6.1 m)
- Depth: 6.5 ft (2.0 m) depth of hold
- Propulsion: steam engine; twin propeller

Nahcotta was a steamboat operated from 1898 to 1928 on a route from Astoria, Oregon to Ilwaco, Washington, and then, from 1908 on, from Astoria to Megler, Washington. Nahcotta ran on the same route for its entire service life, and for much of that time was commanded by Capt. Tom Parker, who started his marine career as a deckhand and who had only three months of formal education.

== Construction ==
Nahcotta was built at Portland, Oregon in 1898 for the Oregon Railway and Navigation Company. Nahcotta was 96 ft (29.3 m) long, with a beam of 20.1 ft (6.1 m) and depth of hold of 6.5 ft (2.0 m).

Overall size of the vessel was 149 gross tons; 112 net tons, with tons being a measure of volume and not weight. The merchant vessel registry number was 130793. The home port, that is, where the steamer's permanent documentation was kept, was Port Townsend, Washington.

Nahcotta was built by Portland Iron Works. Reportedly the machinery proved to have been a failure after several trial trips, and was replaced by machinery manufactured in the east.

== Operations ==
Starting from 1899 and lasting until at last 1921, Nahcotta was under the command of Capt. Thomas Parker. Parker had started working on steamers as a deckhand when only a young boy. He became one of the most experienced masters in the Astoria area. A newspaperman estimated that by 1921, Parker had in forty years crossed the river 4,800 times for a total distance of 250,000 miles. Parker had come from a background of poverty and he had only three months of formal education.

=== Ilwaco terminus ===
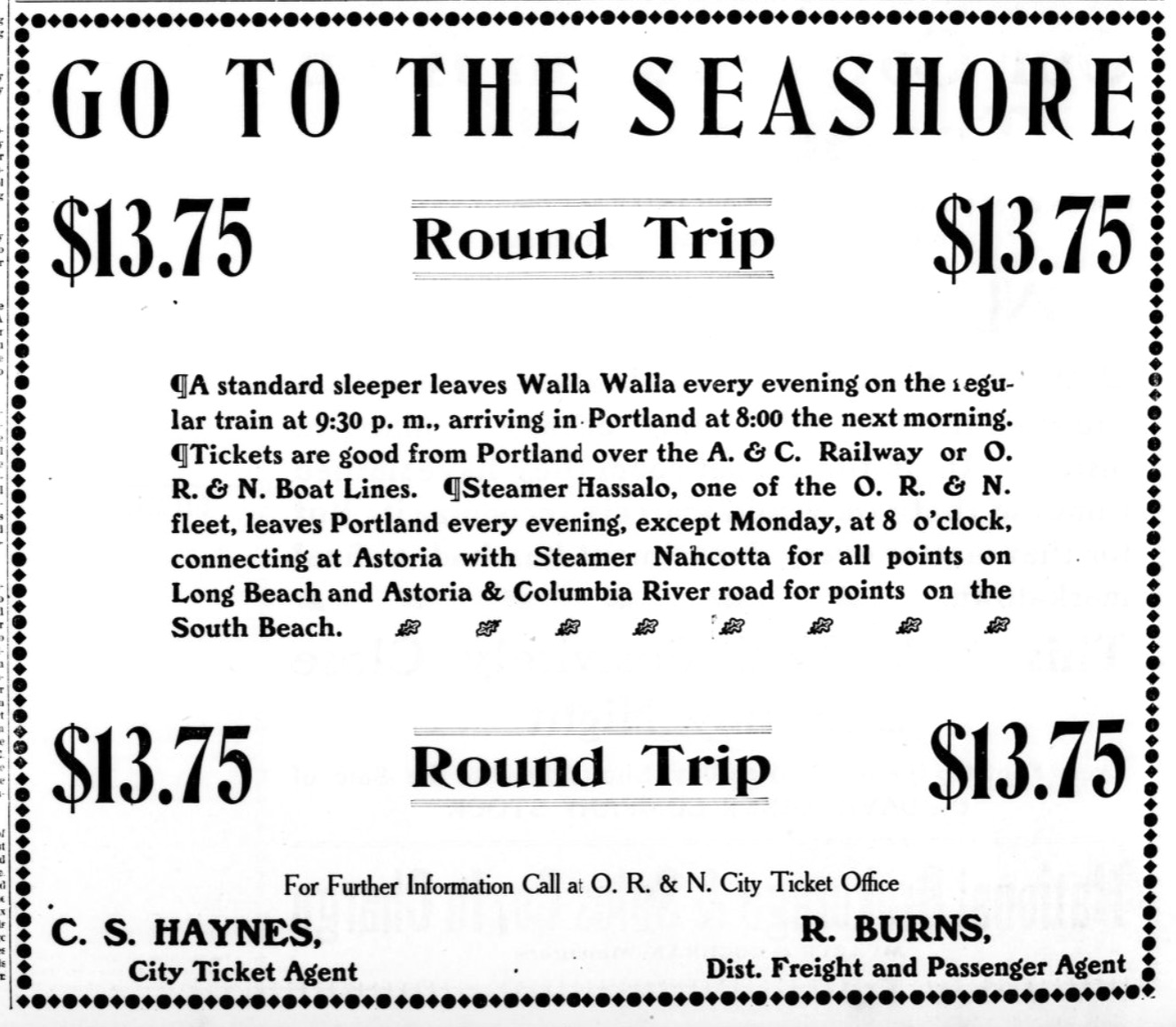
Advertisement for travel to the Long Beach Peninsula, August 22, 1906, showing Nahcotta as part of the route.

Nahcotta was built for the run across the Columbia River from Astoria, Oregon to Ilwaco, Washington. It took about two hours for the steamer to reach Ilwaco from Astoria. Once at Ilwaco, the steamer would meet a train from the Ilwaco Railway and Navigation Company which would then carry passengers and freight to points on the Long Beach Peninsula, then as now a vacation area.

Because of the extreme shallow water at the railroad's dock in Ilwaco restricted steamboat access to times when it was permitted by the tide, for so long as the railroad's southern terminus was at Ilwaco, the railroad's schedule was based on the tide charts. For example, a schedule for April, 1905, shows times of departure from Astoria for the steamer Nahcotta as varying from as early as 5:00 a.m. to as late as 8:30 a.m.

In August 1906, Nahcotta met at the Astoria dock the steamer Hassalo, coming down from Portland, to carry passengers and freight across the Columbia to seaside resort areas on the Long Beach Peninsula.

In 1908, Nahcotta was sent to Portland, to be refitted as an oil-burner, and to operate as a passenger ferry.

=== Rescue of M.F. Hazen ===
On February 3, 1905, Nahcotta, with Capt. Parker in command, rescued crewmen from the steamer M.F. Hazen, which had struck an obstruction in the river while towing a barge laden with hay and feed to Chinook, Washington.

M.F. Hazen had capsized, throwing the captain in the water, who was able to cling on to the obstruction itself, which was called a spile. The engineer had climbed on to the bottom of the overturned Hazen. Nahcotta was able to get a line out to the steamer and the barge, but could not handle both, anchoring the steamer, and towing the barge into Chinook. Other vessels towed and righted Hazen.

=== Megler terminus ===
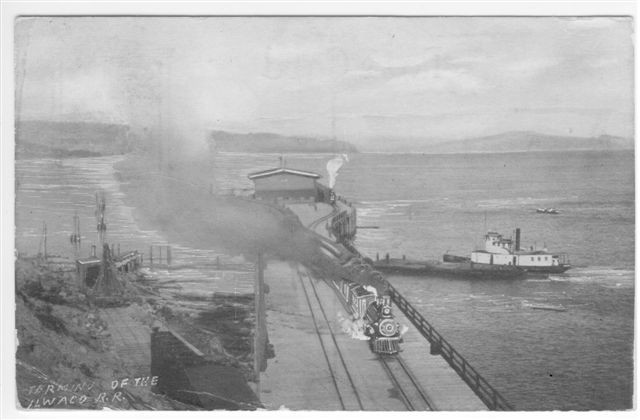
Nahcotta is on the right in this 1914 postcard, shown as moored at the floating dock.

On June 1, 1908, a large wharf carrying railroad tracks was completed at Megler, Washington. Nahcotta was taken off the Ilwaco run, for a new terminus at Megler. The Ilwaco Railway and Navigation Company, by then owned by the Union Pacific Railroad, had run an extension down to Megler, so it was no longer necessary for steamers to meet the train at Ilwaco.

Because the water was deeper at Megler, steamers no longer had to be concerned about the tides, and the railroad could run on a regular schedule. Nahcotta made two round trips a day across the five mile distance between Astoria and Megler. The distance from Astoria to Megler was five miles.

=== Captain seriously injured ===
On December 1, 1910, Captain Parker was seriously injured while standing in the pilot house. The men on the foredeck were turning a cargo-loading crank, which malfunctioned, sending an iron bar flying towards the pilot house, which struck Captain Parker. The captain lost an eye as a result, and suffered a deep gash on the forehead.

Despite these injuries, Parker was reportedly able to walk off the boat to a carriage to be taken to a hospital. According to Parker's own reminiscence in 1921, he was knocked unconscious for 21 days, with the local newspapers reporting daily on his condition.

== Disposition ==
By the 1920s, Nahcotta was encountering strong competition from automobile ferries, who also had a separate dock at Megler. Nahcotta ran as a passenger ferry until about 1928, when it was partially dismantled. The hulk ended up as a floating fish store at Cathlamet, Washington.
