= Spieler =

Spieler is a German and Jewish surname, meaning "player" in German. It also refers to lecturers, public speakers, and frequently barkers at circus and entertainment venues. Notable people with the surname include:

- Marlena Spieler (born 1949), food writer
- Mathias Spieler (c. 1640–1691), Swedish architect
- Simen Spieler Nilsen (born 1993), Norwegian speed skater
