= Mascot (sternwheeler) =

Sternwheel-driven steamboat

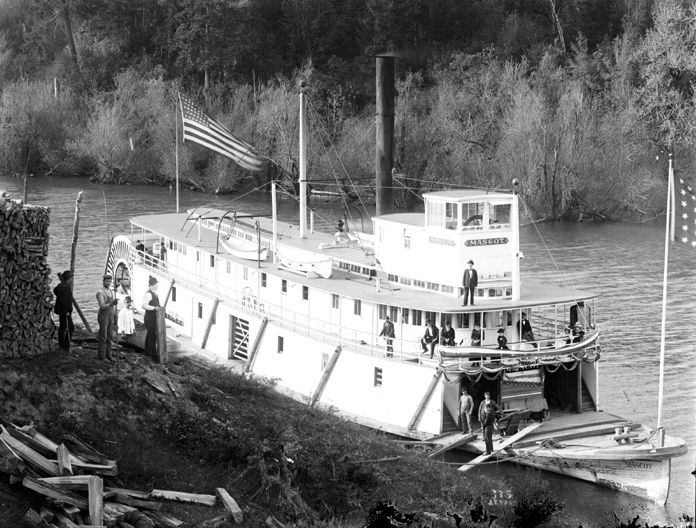
- Mascot loading cordwood fuel circa 1900, probably on the Lewis River.

History
- Name: Mascot
- Owner: Jacob Kamm; Lewis and Lake River Co.; Vancouver Trans. Co.
- Route: Lewis, Lake, lower Columbia, and lower Willamette rivers
- Builder: Charles Bureau or Jacob Kamm
- In service: 1890
- Out of service: 1911
- Identification: US #92253 (1890–1908) #204927(1908–1911)
- Fate: Burned in Lewis River

General characteristics
- Type: Inland river steamer, multiple use
- Tonnage: 267.35 GT, 199.46 RT (1890–1908); 299 GT / 258 RT 1908–1911)
- Length: 132 ft (40.23 m) (1890–1908); 141 ft (42.98 m) (1908–1911)
- Beam: 24 ft (7.32 m) (1890–1908); 26.8 ft (8.17 m) (1908–1911)
- Depth: 5.5 ft (1.68 m) depth of hold (1890–1908); 6.8 ft (2.07 m) depth of hold (1908–1911)
- Installed power: twin steam engines, horizontally mounted, cylinder bore 13 in (330.2 mm) (or 15 in (381.0 mm)) and stroke of 5 ft (1.52 m); wood-fired boilers (1890–1905); oil-fired (1905–1911)
- Propulsion: stern-wheel

Mascot was a sternwheel-driven steamboat built in 1890 which operated primarily on a route running from Portland, Oregon down the Willamette and Columbia rivers to points on the Lewis and Lake rivers. Points served included the town of Woodland, Washington, on the main branch of the Lewis, and La Center, Washington on the east fork.

Mascot also served Ridgefield on the Lake River. Mascot operated briefly as a replacement boat on the upper Willamette River. Mascot has been described as the "prime example of a jobbing boat." Mascot was in operation from 1890 to 1911, including a 1908 reconstruction, which was a relatively long time for a vessel of its type, built entirely of wood.

This sternwheeler should not be confused with the small steamboat Mascot which operated at about the same time on the Alsea River and Yaquina Bay.

Mascot was operated a route that ran between Portland, Oregon and the Lewis and Lake rivers in Cowlitz and Clark counties in southwestern Washington.

Although Mascot was profitable, it had a series of sinkings and other accidents giving it a reputation as a "hoodoo" boat, that is, a jinxed vessel. Much of this reputation was simply newspaper derision, but there were also several fatal incidents, including at least two apparent suicides or attempted suicides and two instances of fatalities to crew members.

Mascot was rebuilt in 1908 at Portland for the Lewis and Lake River Co. Mascot burned in 1911 on the Lewis River.

== Construction ==
Who built Mascot is disputed in the sources. In 1901, it was reported that one river man recalled that Charles Bureau had built and named Mascot, and that when Capt. Bureau could not make a profit from the boat, he sold it to Jacob Kamm, who is usually credited with its construction. Mascot’s hull and cabin were built entirely of wood.

== Dimensions ==
Mascot was 132 ft (40.23 m) long, exclusive of the extension of the main deck over the stern, called the fantail, on which the sternwheel was mounted. Mascot had a beam of 24 ft (7.32 m) exclusive of the heavy timbers along the upper hull called guards. The steamer had a depth of hold of 5.5 ft (1.68 m) feet. Mascot measured out at 267.35 gross tons (a unit of volume, not weight) and 199.46 registered tons.

Mascot’s original merchant vessel identification number was 92253. After Mascot was reconstructed in 1908, a new merchant vessel identification number was assigned, 204927.

== Engineering ==
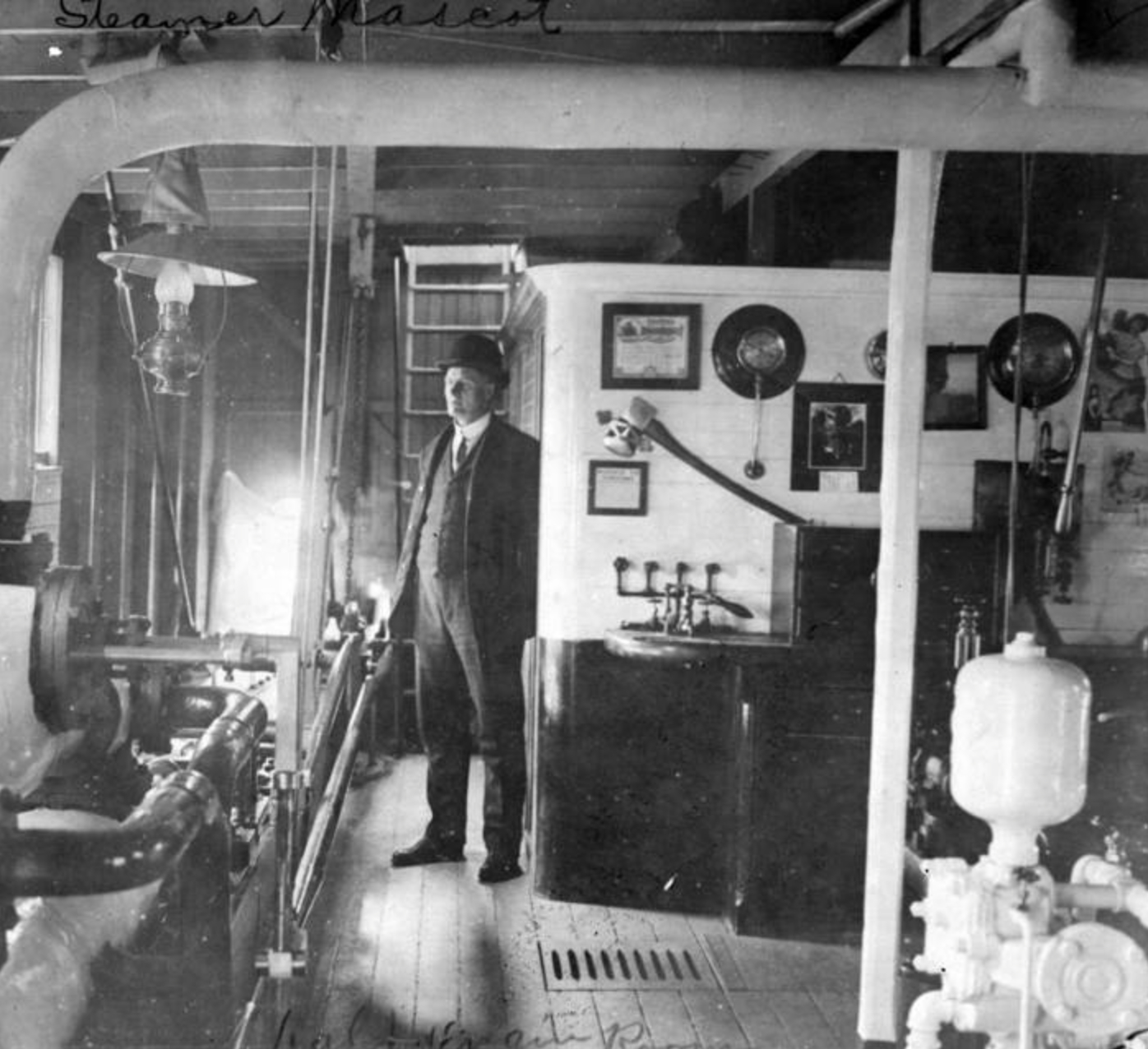
Machinery room on Mascot. One of the two steam engines is on the right. Man in image is probably the chief engineer.

Mascot was driven by twin steam engines, horizontally mounted, each with a bore of 13 (or 15) inches and a stroke of 60 inches. The boiler generating the steam for these engines was wood-fired.

== Route ==
The Lewis River emptied into the Columbia river at a point about 9 miles downriver fem the mouth of the Willamette River, and about 25 miles from Portland. In 1896 there was no railroad access to the towns along the river. All traffic in and out of the area either had to go by river or by the very poor roads then in existence.

At a point 3.75 miles from the Columbia, the Lewis River splits into two branches, which were called the North Fork and the East Fork. The North Fork carried more water. The town of La Center was on the east fork, just over 3 miles from the junction of the East and North Forks.

The Lewis River below the forks was generally 400 to 600 feet wide, narrowing to 200 feet at the forks. On the East Fork up to La Center, the river was 150 to 200 feet wide.

Steamboats from Portland could run up the Lewis River and the East Fork as far as La Center except during low water. At low water it was necessary to transfer cargo and passengers to a smaller steamer above the forks, and at extreme low water rowboats had to be used.

From 1892 to 1904, Mascot ran on the Lewis and Lake rivers under the ownership of Jacob Kamm with no opposition. Mascot stopped at about 25 landings between Portland and the head of navigation on the Lewis river. The main towns on the Lewis River were Woodland and La Center, Washington. The main town on the Lake River was Ridgefield, Washington.

The route was reported to be a profitable one. Produce went from the landings on the river to the Portland markets, and better passenger traffic than on other steamboat routes.

== Early career ==
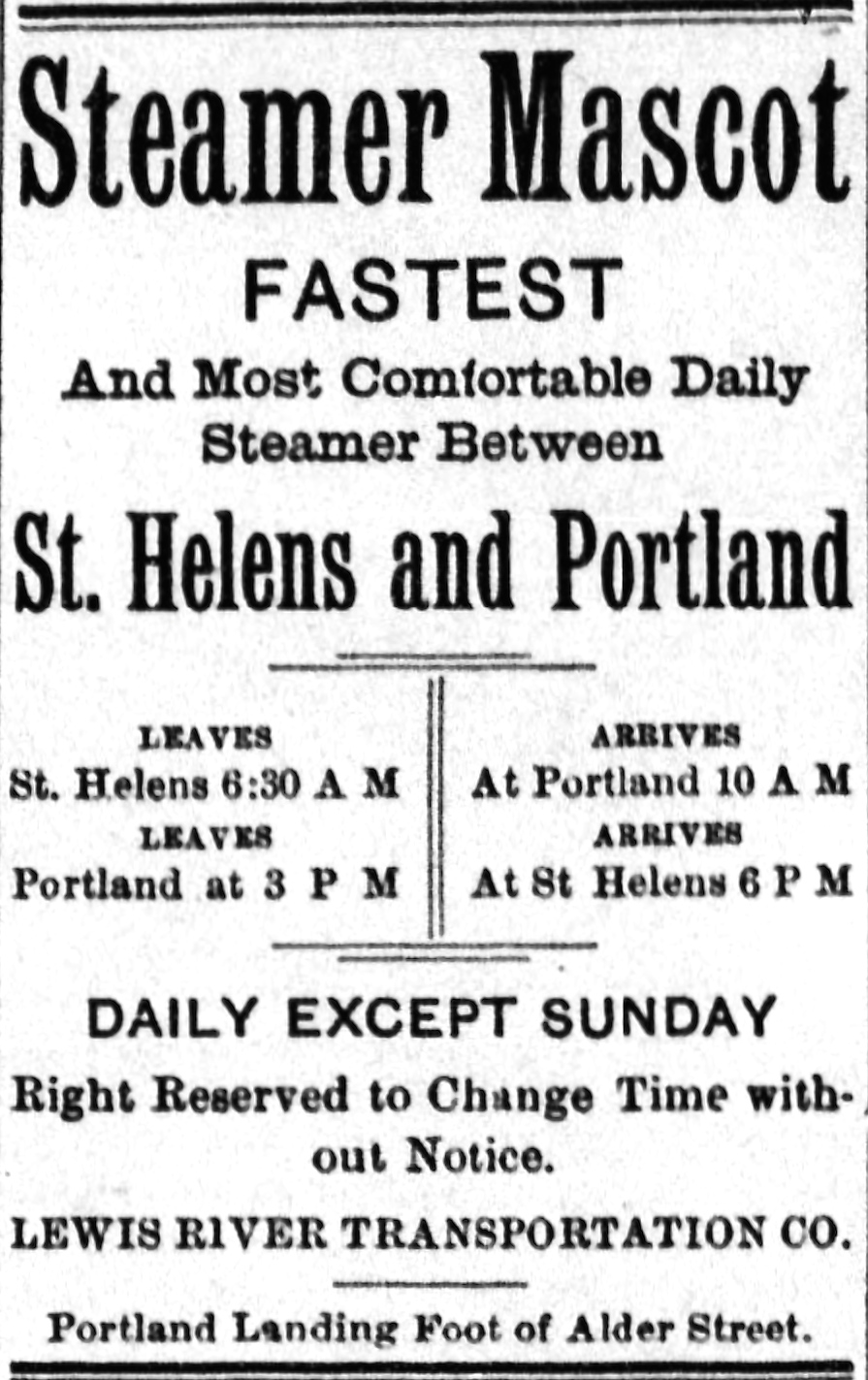
Advertisement for Mascot, placed May 10, 1895 in the Oregon Mist, of St. Helens, Oregon.

=== Competition with Toledo ===
In August 1891, Mascot was running against the steamer Toledo, a shallow-draft sternwheeler owned by a consortium of about 600 farmers who had pledged to use Toledo. According to one newspaper report, Toledo was cutting into Mascot’s business. At that time, August, 1891, Mascot was owned by the Lewis River Transportation Company.

=== Shift to Rainier route ===
In early March 1892 Mascot was expected to start making daily trips from Rainier, Oregon to Portland in opposition to the steamer Joseph Kellogg.

=== Collision with Sarah Dixon ===
On the morning of Friday, October 20, 1893, Mascot collided with the sternwheeler Sarah Dixon at St. Helens, Oregon. Mascot and Dixon usually approached the St. Helens waterfront at the same time in the morning from opposite directions. In foggy conditions on the Friday in question the two boats collided bow on in front of Muckle’s wharf. Each boat struck the other a strong but glancing blow a few feet off the jack staff, but neither vessel sustained any serious damage.

=== Flood on the Columbia ===
In June 1894 there was a major flood on the Columbia River. According to Captain A.W. Gray (b.1850), of the Mascot, quoted in the Daily Morning Astorian:

Down along our route the people of the lowlands have deserted their homes and fled to the hills for safety. … Masters of boats plying in the Columbia are doing all in their power to help these people such as removing their furniture and stores and sometimes livestock to safer localities. We have also rescued a great many people, who remained in their houses until the last minute, when a quaking of the building indicated that the foundation was loosening, and it would soon be swept away.

Mascot and other steamers rescued people, livestock and cattle, with Mascot alone carrying away 900 head of cattle and horses to the hills. Extensive damage was done to the wharves and docks at St. Helens and Ridgefield. The water was so deep that Mascot could travel as much as four miles inland from the main bank of the Columbia river.

=== Temporary replacement by Elwood ===
In mid-September 1894, the steamer Elwood was placed on Mascot’s route while Mascot was being repaired. Although Elwood required too much depth of water to go up the Lewis River, Mascot’s owners had "a little steamer that draws very little water and makes a great deal of noise" available for Lewis River work, connecting with Elwood at the mouth of the river. The Portland landing for Mascot was at the foot of Alder street.

== Operations in later 1890s ==
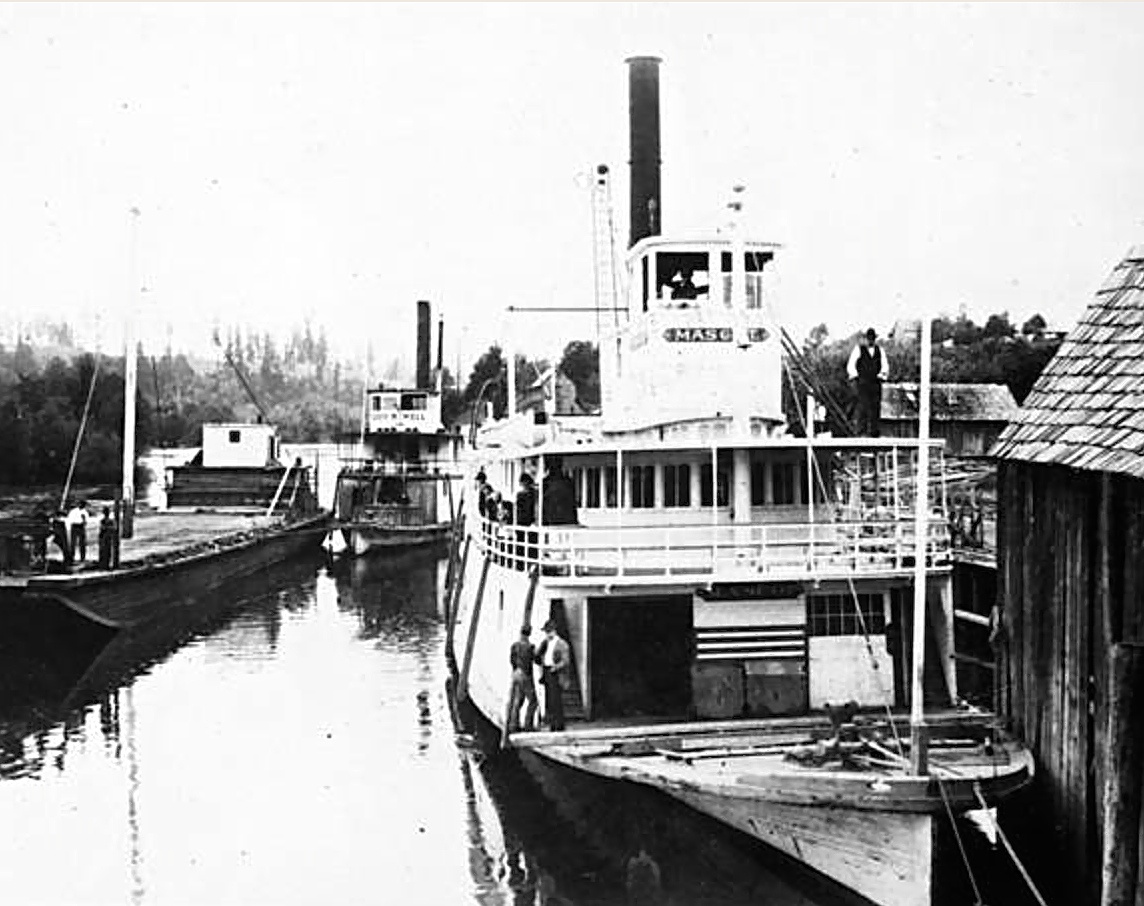
Mascot, on right, Governor Newell in center, and a scow, on left, at La Center, circa 1900.

In May 1895, the Lewis River Transportation Company advertised Mascot as the "fastest and most comfortable steamer between St. Helens, Oregon and Portland." Every day except Sunday, Mascot left St. Helens at 6:30 a.m. and arrived at Portland at 10:00 a.m. Returning, Mascot left Portland at 3:00 p.m. and arrived at St. Helens at 6:00 p.m. Fare was 25 cents.

On Tuesday, March 24, 1896, Victor Davis (1881–1910), the 14-year-old son of Captain W.A. Davis of the Mascot was arrested and charged with shooting at a deckhand on the Mascot. The details of the charges were not immediately available, but according to newspaper accounts, somehow the steamer had come by while young Davis was sitting on a bridge fishing.

A deckhand on Mascot then threw a potato (Mascot used to transport a lot of potatoes) at the boy, who in retaliation, threw a stone at the deckhand. The deckhand then threw another stone at young Davis, who then somehow managed to get hold of a shotgun and shot it at the deckhand, but fortunately missed hitting anyone.

The next month, April 1896, Victor Davis pled guilty in Clark County Superior Court to the charge of simple assault, and fine of $25 and court costs was imposed.

Victor Davis later became a steamboat captain himself, and when he died on Sunday, May 29, 1910, in Portland, following funeral services at Holman's undertaking, his body was taken back to La Center aboard Mascot. His father, W.A. Davis, then pilot of the sternwheeler Beaver, survived him.

Mascot was capable of carrying a herd of 400 sheep, as it did on the morning of August 3, 1898, running them to Morgan's ranch on Sauvie's Island.

On the morning of Tuesday April 14, 1896, as Mascot was coming down the Lake River from Ridgefield, Washington, a man who was not identified, climbed on the railing on the cabin deck and jumped into the river. Captain Lee of Mascot signaled some fishermen to pick up the man. They did so, and he turned out to have a mental illness.

== Snag problems on the Lewis River ==
Steamboat operations on the Lewis River were made difficult by the presence of numerous sunken trees and logs, called "snags." Steamboat operators had to plan ahead for striking snags and be ready to beach their vessels in case of emergencies. According to a January 1900 Morning Oregonian report, "the north fork of the Lewis river just below Woodland is a perfect next of snags, enough to make a steamboatman’s hair stand on end, and the only wonder is that more boats are not sunk there."

=== 1898 sinking ===
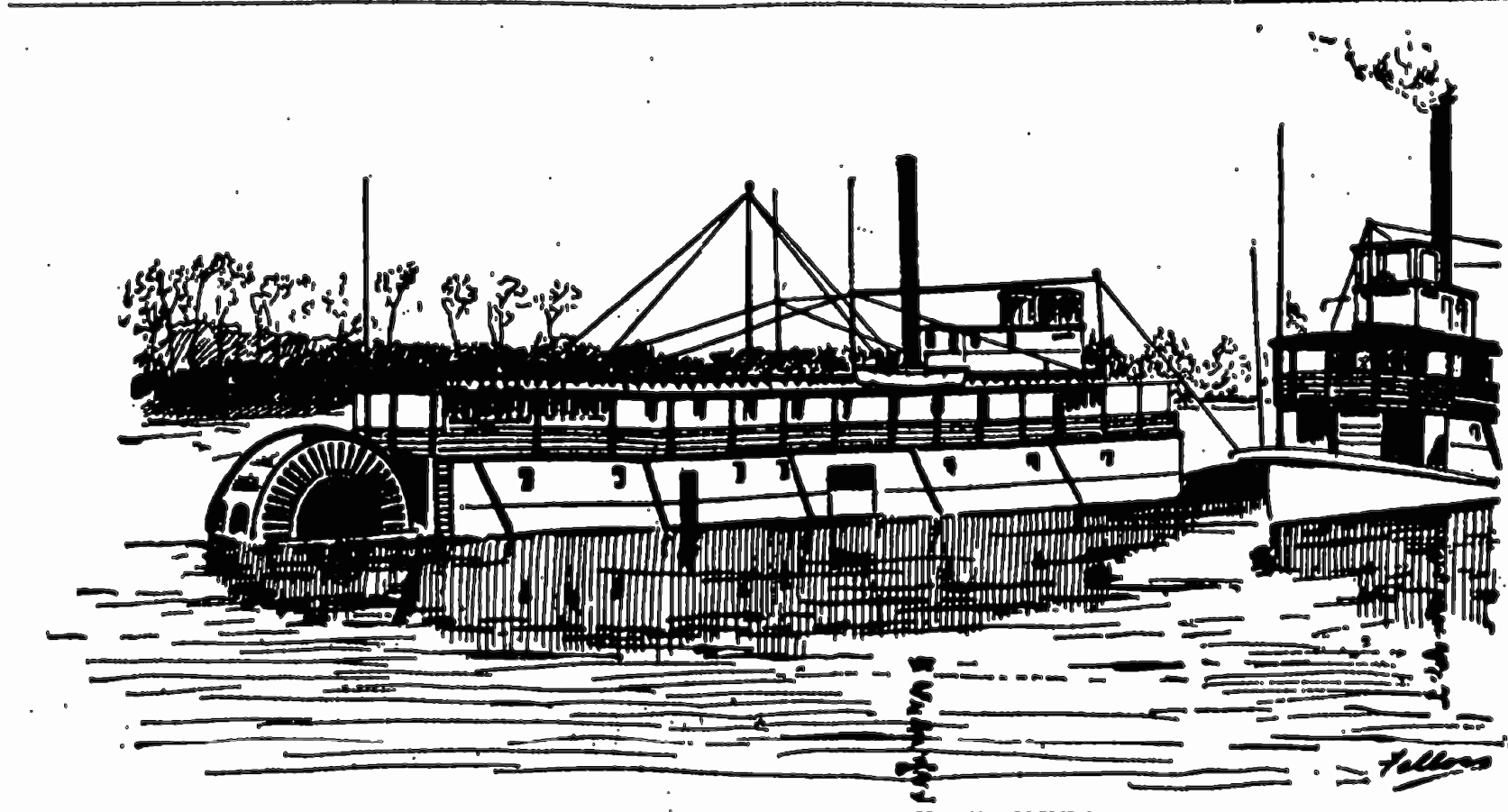
Mascot sunk in the Lewis River, December 9, 1898. Either Walker or Undine is shown on right, rendering assistance.

On December 7, 1898, Mascot hit a snag in the Lewis River and sank. The incident occurred in mid-channel at Richardsons Landing. The accident occurred just after the steamer had left Woodland at 5:30 a.m. The steamer reached a point about one-half mile from the mouth of the river, and had just passed the most dangerous part, after which Captain Davis left the pilot house and turned the wheel over to the mate.

Just as the captain was sitting down to breakfast, he felt the boat suddenly lurch to a stop. The snag broke through the hull in the middle of the boat, causing Mascot to sink in six feet of water. The lower deck was submerged under about two feet of water, while the water just covered the bow.

There were about 50 passengers on board at the time, and a newspaper report stated that "for a moment considerable excitement prevailed, but as soon as they realized that the boat was resting on the bottom, order was restored." The steamer Walker came by to take off the passengers and assist the sunken Mascot. There was no loss of life or damage to cargo. The estimated damage to the steamer was $400.

Capt. Charles Tilton Kamm (1860–1906), superintendent of the Lewis River Transportation Company, stated that the wreck was caused by the steamer getting out of the channel and running into a hard clay bank, out of which projected a huge snag which tore a large hole in the hull, much worse than had been originally thought. The hole went from under the boiler back to the cylinder timbers, which were the heavy wooden braces under the engines near the rear of the vessel.

Until Mascot could be repaired, its route would be covered by the Sarah Dixon.

=== 1900 sinking ===
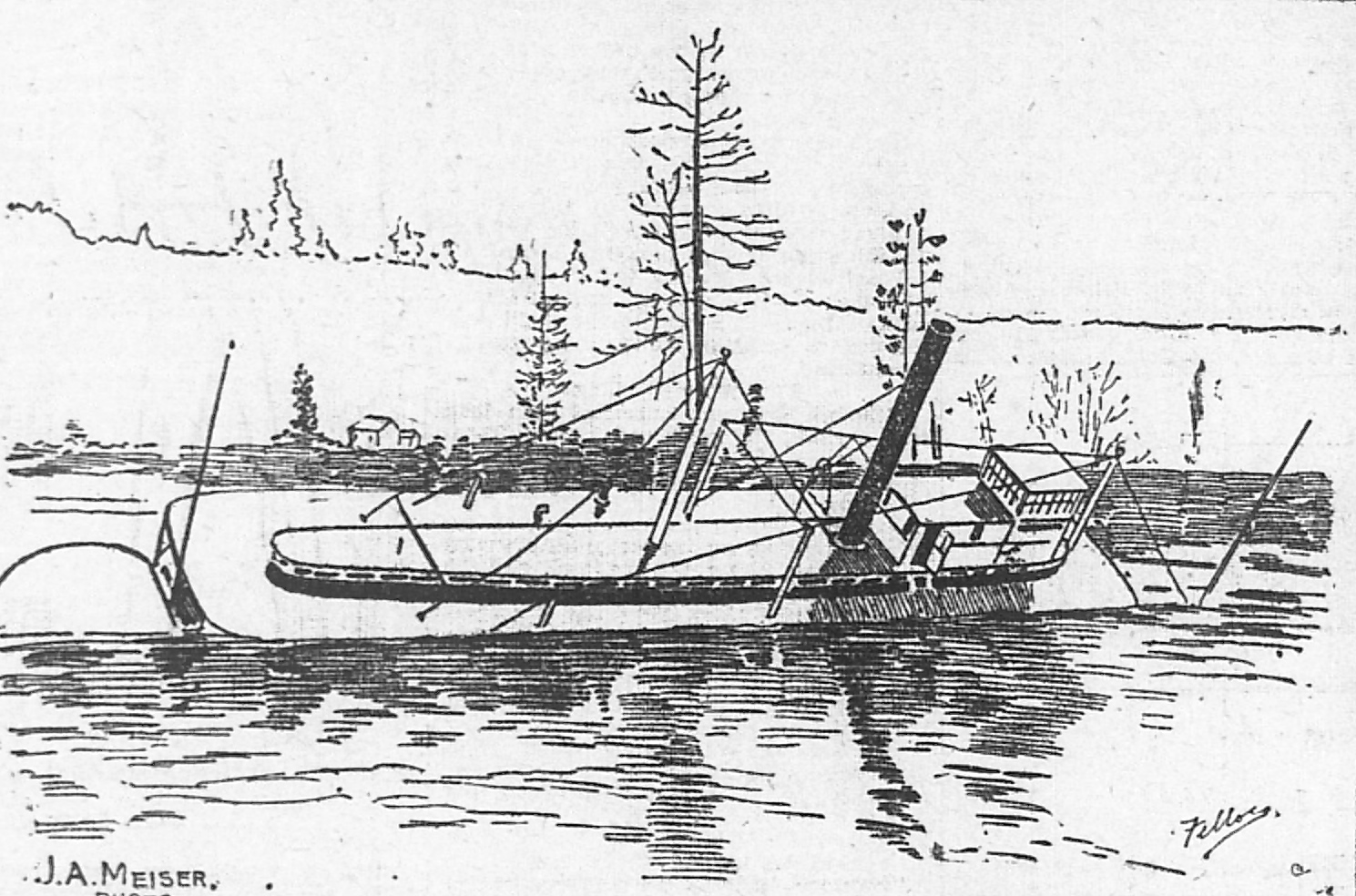
Mascot sunk on the Lewis River, January 1900.

On Thursday, January 4, 1900, Mascot "found another of the snags in the Lewis River", prompting the Morning Oregonian to quip that "the steamer Mascot will never have any luck till her name is changed to Hoodoo." The sinking happened near the mouth of the north fork of the Lewis River.

Mascot had been running under Captain Davis at the time. He was able to beach the vessel on a bar in the river with the objective of keeping its deck dry until the hole in the hull could be repaired. It was initially anticipated that Mascot would be refloated again in a few days. In the meantime, the company's steamer G.W. Walker took over its route.

However it turned out that the sandbank on which Mascot had been beached was actually quicksand which was being pushed downwards under the weight of the boat. The steamer Undine left Portland on the evening of January 6 with a barge and lifting equipment to raise Mascot off the bar. The raising was going to be much more difficult than had been originally thought.

More detailed reports of the salvage efforts followed. According to one report, Andrew Allen was in charge of the salvage effort. Allen found Mascot lying on its side in quicksand, in a position where it would be difficult to get a barge between the boat and the riverbank. Allen took a work crew and heavy chains and timbers to the wreck site, and with these, he developed a plan to raise the Mascot. He would have a barge placed on both sides of the boat, and then run two 14 inch by 16 inch timbers, each 60 feet long, across the deck of the sunken boat.

Then 600 feet of heavy chain would be placed around the hull and secured to the timbers. Jackscrews would be placed under the timbers and gradually turned. As the timbers were raised, they would be blocked up with wood. Allen foresaw no particular danger to Mascot, unless rains should cause a freshet in the river, in which case the hull might fill with sand and the superstructure could wash away.

According to another report, the contractor for refloating Mascot was James Olsen, of the Portland Shipbuilding Company, under the supervision of Capt. Charles T. Kamm, superintendent of Lewis River Transportation Co. According to this report, Mascot was refloated on Saturday January 6, and brought up to Portland on Thursday January 11 between two barges, where the vessel was taken to the Portland Shipbuilding Company for repairs.

Mascot was reported to be resuming its regular schedule on Wednesday, April 18, 1900, leaving the Alder Street Dock in Portland daily (except Sunday) at 3:00 p.m.

=== 1904 sinking ===
In September 1904, Mascot struck a snag on the Lewis River and sank. Mascot was raised and taken to Portland for repairs, which were completed on October 25, 1904, at the Portland Shipyard. While Mascot was out of service, its owners, the Kamm interests, chartered Leona from the Oregon City Navigation Company to take Mascot’s place.

== Hoodoo boat ==
Following extensive repairs in the first part of 1901, Mascot was launched on Monday, April 8, 1901. The repairs, which had lasted for two or three weeks, were necessary because of a collision that Mascot had had with the sternwheeler Hercules. At this time Mascot was owned by the Vancouver Transportation Company, a concern of Jacob Kamm.

Early the next morning, the watchman went on board and found water in the hold. According to one newspaper account, at about 5:00 p.m. a river steamer came by, creating a heavy swell, which caused Mascot to roll over to the right, crushing some of the superstructure against the wharf. Mascot then rolled over to the left, and sank in 15 feet of water.

Newspapers of the time noted the inconsistency between the boat's name and its apparent bad luck. The Morning Astorian commented that "this is the fourth serious accident that has happened to the vessel and she seems to belie her hame with a consistency that would be admirable under other circumstances." The Morning Oregonian facetiously remarked that "the next boat Mr. Kamm builds will probably be named the Hoodoo."

Nor was the Morning Oregonian finished with its remarks, running on April 11, 1901, a story which stated that the boat was still on the boat of the river, and noting that the cabin furniture "has been removed to a dry place, but the wetting it got did not do any particular damage, as it has been there before."

By June 18, 1901, Mascot was back in service, carrying that day as one of its passengers former Oregon governor Sylvester Pennoyer from Portland to the Lewis River, where Pennoyer owned a 460-acre ranch.

== Low water on the rivers ==
The water in the Lewis river was often too shallow for Mascot. The owners of Mascot, and their competitors, adopted various strategies to overcome this problem. These alternatives could involve rowboats, barges, shallow draft accessory steamers, and overland transportation by stage.

=== 1891 low water ===
In August 1891, Lewis River Transportation Co. started building a new light draft boat to work only on the upper forks of the Lewis River, carrying the freight down to deeper water to be shipped out on Mascot on daily runs to Portland. The new steamer was reported to be 120 feet long with a beam of 26 feet.

Meanwhile, Woodland Transportation, owners of Toledo, Mascot's chief competitor at the time, were building another boat to run on the Lewis River. The new boat, under construction at Woodland in August 1891, would be 80 feet, and would run above tidewater only on the Lewis river, gathering freight and transferring it to Toledo. Toledo was under the command of Capt. W.A. Davis. Toledo was transferred out of the Lewis River service and in 1896 sank on the Yamhill River.

=== 1900 low water ===
In late August 1900, the water on the Columbia River was reported to be as low as had ever been known for the season, and the same conditions applied in the Columbia’s tributaries. Mascot could not operate on the Lewis River above the forks. In some places on the east fork of the Lewis River the water depth was no more than four inches.

In 1899, Congress had appropriated $10,000 for dredging and improving the east fork of the Lewis River, but by 1900, only a mile had been deepened. A breakwater had been installed near La Center, but this would not improve navigation until the high water season began.

=== 1904 low water ===
On July 30, 1904, Mascot made its last trip to La Center, about three miles upriver from the forks of the Lewis river, owing to low water above the forks. From the forks to La Center the freight would have to be carried by scows. Low water blocked navigation for about three months of the year, and the only other way of accessing the river towns was over rough mountain roads using wagons pulled by teams. Skiffs and other small craft were used for carrying freight during shallow water times on the river.

=== 1905 low water ===
On July 22, 1905, when Mascot could not navigate above the forks due to low water, its owners, the Kamm line, leased the gasoline launch Dix to provide service to points above the forks, including La Center. Dix was owned by Thomas Byers, who had been operating the launch in Portland harbor since the opening of the Lewis and Clark Exposition on June 1, 1905. Dix could carry 12 passengers, and drew less than a foot of water when loaded.

The plan was for Mascot to discharge its freight at the forks into light-draft scows, which would be towed upriver to La Center and other points. Before chartering Dix, the Kamm line had been moving passenger and freight up from the forks using rowboats, but this turned out to be too slow.

The owners of Mascot’s 1905 competitor, Leona, running on the same route, had a gasoline launch built at the Supple yard in Portland, to run upstream from the Lewis river forks. This launch was reported to draw only 3 inches of water when light, and only 5 inches when loaded with 10 tons of freight.

=== 1909 low water ===
The 1909 low water season lasted until near the end of October, when heavy rains fell in the region. The Lewis River rose rapidly, and Mascot was able to reach Woodland for the first time that fall on November 2, 1909. Mascot’s associated steamer, Etna, had been running for the previous week on the upper Lewis, providing service to the lumber mills and logging camps. The steamboat business was reported to have been better than it had been for two previous years.

=== 1910 low water ===
The water was low on the upper Lewis river in late July, 1910, as it usually was. With Mascot unable to reach La Center, Spiellei and a barge were employed to transport freight to the frocks of the Lewis.

As Spiellei was towing the barge, loaded with 15 tons of freight, the wind caught the barge, causing it to tilt, and the cabin to give way. Feed, machinery, and other items were toppled into the river, causing a loss of about $200 in damage.

The water level had fallen again by October 1910, and by October 9, Mascot was no longer able to reach Woodland. On its last trip to Woodland, Mascot had to line over shallow places in the river.

By this time, there were 15 trains a day serving the Lewis River area on the Northern Pacific Railway and the Oregon-Washington Railroad and Navigation Company lines, With Mascot unable to reach Woodland due to low water on the river, the rail competition was growing increasingly strong.

== Later business rivals ==
=== Competition with Leona ===
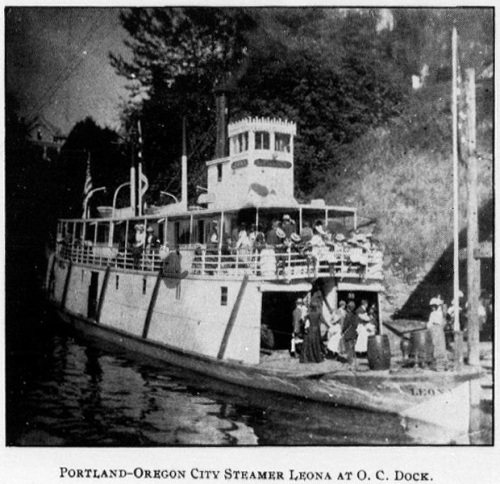
The sternwheeler Leona, competitor of Mascot during 1905.

In late October 1904, the farmers in the area of La Center were reported to be negotiating with the Oregon City Transportation Co. for the purchase of the sternwheeler Leona, to run in opposition to Mascot. Captain Graham, president of Oregon City Transportation Co., said Leona was "for sale at a reasonable price."

The Lewis River ranchers were so confident that they could acquire Leona that they were simultaneously looking into acquiring the usage of a dock in Portland, probably the one at the foot of Washington street, also known as the Hosford dock, to operate the boat from. If an independent line could be established, the newspaper speculation was that "one of the biggest rate wars in the history of navigation on the Columbia will result."

On the afternoon of November 23, 1904, the Oregon City Transportation Company sold Leona to Capt. Newt Graham, William Marshall, and Fred Brauer, who intended to place Leona on the Lewis river route on December 1, 1904, operating from the Oak Street dock in Portland.

There was much talk among steamboatmen that once Leona on the route, a rate war would break out, with some saying Jacob Kamm would carry freight and passengers for nothing. Several years before Kamm had beat the competition on Mascot’s route by similar tactics. Mascot’s agent, Allen Harrison, was quoted in the Oregon Daily Journal:

There will be ‘something doing’ just as soon as the opposition boat goes out on her first trip. Everyone knows that there is not a sufficient amount of business on the Mascot’s run to justify an additional boat being placed on the same route. A rate war will surely follow, and it will be a warm one as long as it lasts.

Leona's entry into the Lewis River trade as an opposition boat generated a favorable local press comment:

The Kamm Co. (Lewis River Transportation Co.) service has been the poorest that ever ran on this river since the SWALLOW and HYDRA ran on it. If you know what side your bread is buttered on and have any sympathy for your neighbors, patronize the opposition boat LEONA at the foot of Oak Street Portland. If the people don't patronize it they ought to be compelled to walk to Ridgefield to the Railroad if they go at all.

In February 1905, Mascot was returned to the Lewis River route, taking the place of another chartered Oregon City Transportation Company steamer, the sternwheeler Altona. The water level was still low in the Lewis River on February 20, 1905 when Mascot resumed regular service, so it ran only to the forks of the river. The same morning that Mascot returned to regular service, Leona was reported to have arrived in Portland from the Lewis River with "a big cargo of freight and a full passenger list."

Leona went into service on the Lewis River route on the morning of November 30, 1904, with Capt. Newt Graham as master, Fred J. Brauer, purser, and William Marshall as on shore manager.

In April 1906 Leona was taken off the Lewis River run. The Kamm line was too tough a competitor to be driven off the route.

=== Competition with Relief ===
In May, 1906, Fred J. Brauer announced his plan to place in service as an opposition boat his gasoline launch Relief. Relief was a sternwheeler, with a capacity to carry 15 tons of freight. Its main competitive feature was that it could be handled easily by only two men.

== Ice on the river ==
In late January and early February 1902 ice on the Columbia, Willamette and Lewis river hindered steamboat navigation. Mascot left Portland on February 4, 1905 transporting cattle for the Lewis and Lake rivers, became the first boat to make that trip for about 10 days. Ice caused trouble downriver on the Columbia to St. Helens, although it had been somewhat broken up by the passage of ships through the river. Steamboats running between Portland and Astoria had iron plates attached to their bows to help them through the ice.

== Deckhand drowned ==
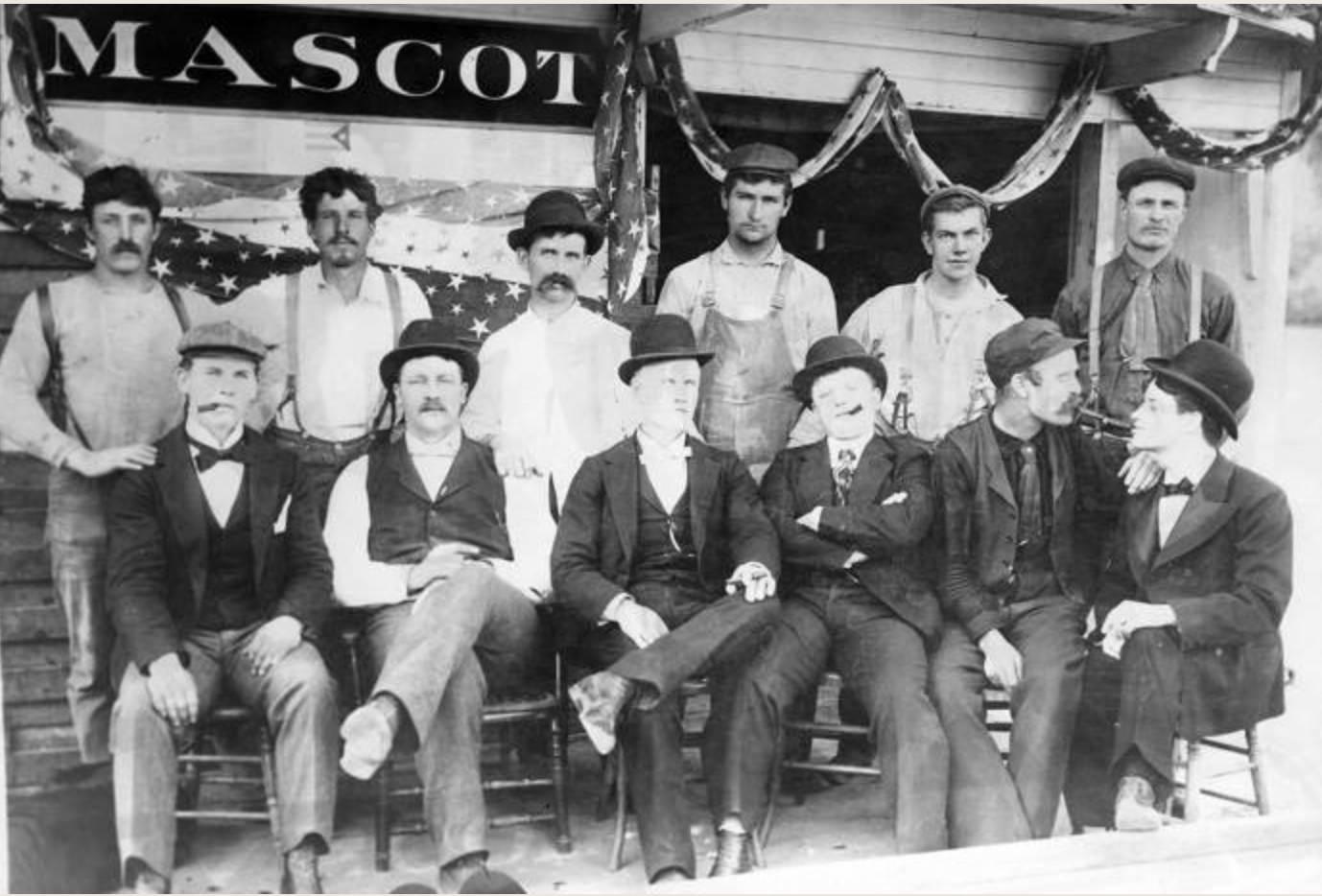
Officers and crew of Mascot, posed photograph, probably taken on an Independence Day, circa 1900.

On the morning of May 20, 1903, William Wisler, a deckhand on Mascot, fell overboard and drowned. The steamer was then coming up the Columbia River from La Center. Wisler was reported to have been cleaning the railing on the upper deck when he apparently lost his balance and fell overboard. Two young women witnesses this, and told two of the young men who were with them about what had happened, but according to the report in the Morning Oregonian, these young men did not tell anyone on the crew.

The alarm was only raised when a few minutes later one of the young women spoke to another passenger, who alerted the purser who in turn informed Captain Davis. Davis halted Mascot, and turned back to the point where it was thought Wisler had fallen into the water, but he could not be located. Wisler was about 22 years old and had no relatives in Oregon. The Morning Oregonian blamed his death on the "cool indifference" of the passengers.

== Later history of the first Mascot ==
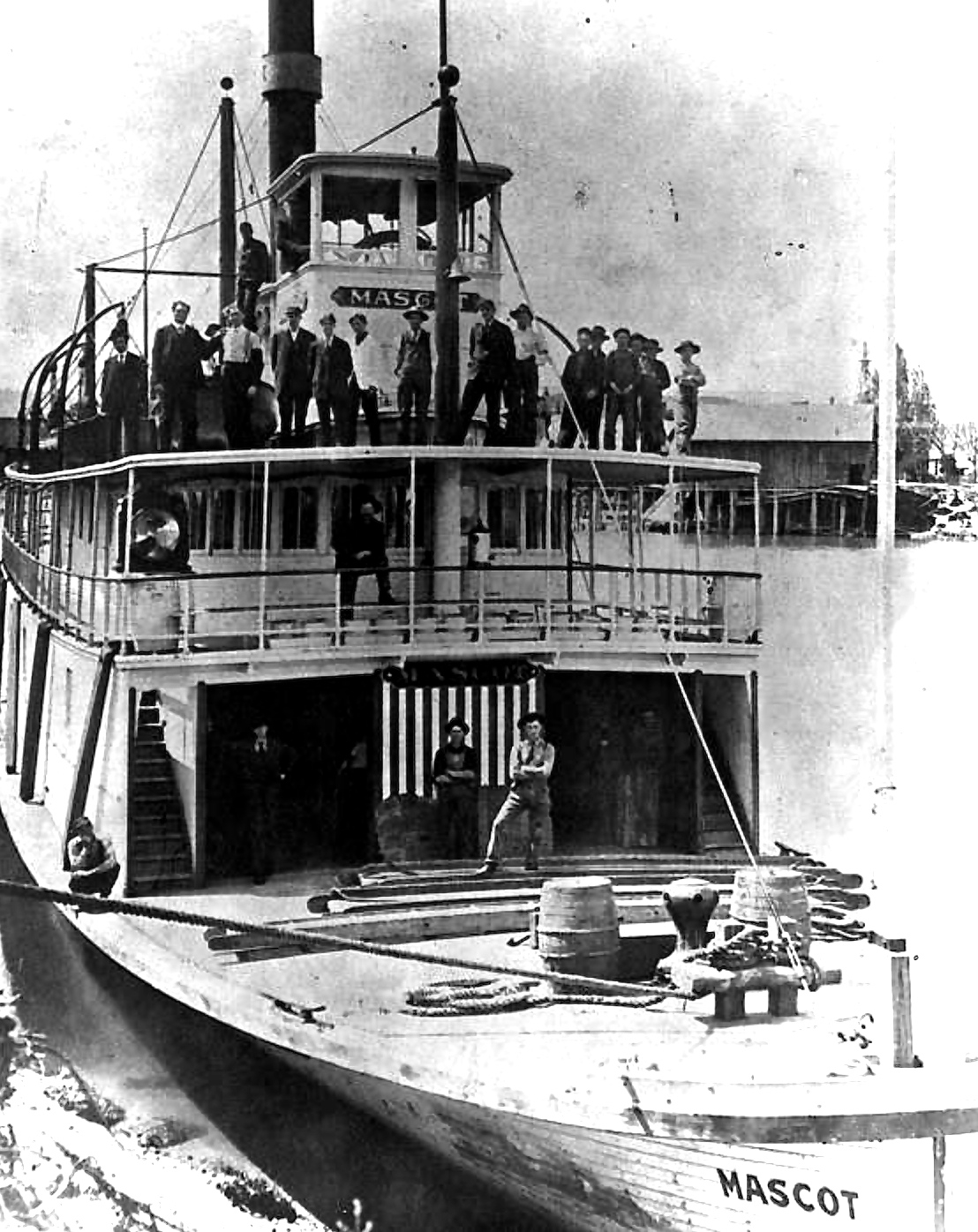
Mascot tied up to a river bank, probably at La Center, circa 1900. Officers and crew are posing on the upper decks.

=== Fire safety problems ===
Steamboats like Mascot were acutely vulnerable to fire. They were built entirely of wood, covered with paint and other flammable materials, and then left outside where they either dried out, rotted, or both, becoming the equivalent of a vast pile of kindling. In the middle of this was placed a steam boiler, fueled by as hot and intense a fire as could be generated by the available technology and the wealth of the owner. The tendency of steamboat owners to overcrowd their vessels also contributed to the danger.

There were many instances throughout the country of inland steamers being destroyed by fire, with tremendous loss of life, such as Sultana, in 1865, with 1,196 people killed, and General Slocum, in 1904, with 1,021 dead. Numerous steamboats were lost in the Pacific Northwest, although none had such severe casualties as the Sultana or the General Slocum.

Theoretically regulations existed to require steamboat operators to have fire safety equipment on board, but these were often poorly enforced, and compliance was by no means uniform. Occasionally there were inspections, however.

In the early morning of April 18, 1905 local steamboat inspectors Edwards and Fuller, along with retired Admiral Louis Kempff, began a series of surprise inspections of steamboats operating on the Columbia and Willamette rivers. By that afternoon, the inspectors reached Mascot, and requested that the steamer conduct a demonstration fire drill.

When one of the ship’s boats was launched, it was found to have a leak in it. That combined with the previous three months of warnings to Mascot's Captain Harry Reeves, led to the captain's license being suspended for ten days.

=== Conversion to oil-burner ===
In June 1905 Mascot was undergoing conversion to an oil-fired boiler.

=== Construction of tender Spiellei ===
In October 1905 the Lewis River Transportation Company built a gasoline-engined sternwheeler for the purpose of running on the northern and eastern forks of the Lewis River during shallow water and then making a connection with Mascot in the deeper water downriver from the forks. The new boat was named Spielei after one of the tributaries of the Lewis River.

Spielei was 45 feet long, 12 feet wide, and drew 6.5 inches of water when light, and 10 inches of water when loaded with 15 tons of freight. The boat had a cabin capable of accommodating 60 passengers. On Spielei’s trial run in Portland harbor, on October 25, 1905, the new boat was reckoned to be capable of running at 10 miles per hour.

=== Caught in logjam for five days ===
On Monday, October 15, 1906, Mascot was caught in a logjam on the Lewis River where the Northern Pacific Railway’s drawbridge crossed the river. Mascot, and her passengers, officers and crew were stuck in the jam for most of the week and did not reach Portland until the evening of Friday, October 19.

Representatives of the Lewis River Transportation Company filed a complaint with Colonel S. W. Roessler, U.S. engineer, to the effect that the stream was being blocked by overuse by loggers and millmen, blocking navigation for hours and even days. Roessler directed an assistant engineer to investigate the matter, with a view towards the preparation of rules which would accommodate all interested parties as much as possible.

=== Condemned as unsafe ===
In late February 1907, Mascot failed to pass a government safety inspection and was reportedly condemned as unsafe for any kind of traffic. Mascot made what was reported to be its last trip to Woodland on Sunday, February 24, 1907. However, Mascot was transporting cattle to Portland on Monday, May 27, 1907.

== Reconstruction ==
In August 1907, Jacob Kamm announced his plan to rebuild Mascot's hull and install new machinery. The upper works of the old Mascot would be moved over to the new hull. Kamm awarded the contract for the reconstruction to Joseph Supple. The steamer would be practically a new vessel once the rebuild was complete.

In August 1907 it was reported that the gasoline-fueled steamer Etna, named after a town on the Lewis River, would be undergoing conversion to steam power, and would work in connection with Mascot on the Lewis River.

In November 1907 the hull for the new Mascot was nearing completion. A decision had reportedly been made to reuse the old machinery. However, when the construction was done, in February 1908, it was reported that new machinery had been installed. The cabin structure, although reused, was rearranged.

By late February 1908, the reconstruction was complete, reportedly having taken about a year to complete. The sternwheeler Tahoma had filled in for Mascot on the Lewis River route while the reconstruction was being done. The reconstruction cost the company $30,000.

The reconstructed steamer was 141 ft (42.98 m) long, with a beam of 26.8 ft (8.17 m) and depth of hold of 6.8 ft (2.07 m). The overall size of the vessel was increased to 299 gross tons and 258 registered tons. The new Mascot was reported to be one of the fastest of its type and to have "but little resemblance to the old boat".

Following reconstruction, Mascot was commanded by Capt. Archibald McNeill.

== Service on the upper Willamette river ==
In December 1909, two of the sternwheelers of the Oregon City Transportation Company became disabled. On Monday, December 13, 1909, near Independence, Oregon, Pomona had blown out two cylinder heads and cracked its sternwheel shaft. Oregona had struck a snag the previous Wednesday and was disabled. Mascot was brought down to run on the upper Willamette between Portland and Corvallis until one of the disabled vessels could be repaired.

== Labor economics ==
Pay for experienced deckhands was about $35 per month in 1910. During the summer, deckhands often shifted over to work at hop yards, logging camps, and other places. According to the Morning Oregonian there were also "a crowd along the beach, regarded as transients, who seldom work more than a few days on any steamer, their aim being to get a small amount of money for immediate needs and then rest." However, despite this, in October 1910, Mascot and other steamers were reportedly running with full crews of experienced men.

== Disposition ==
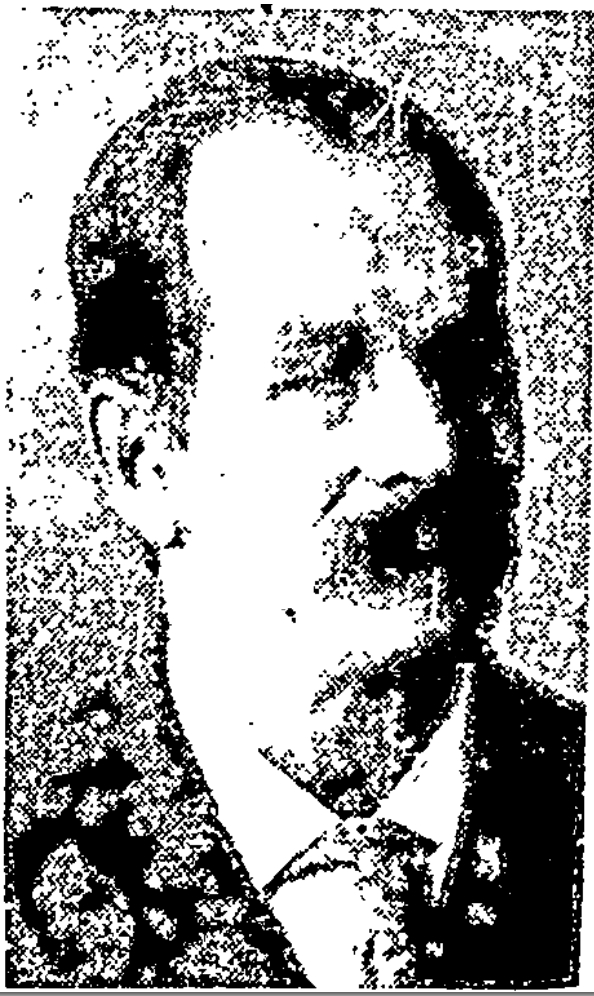
Sydney Illidge (1839–1911), steward of Mascot, killed in the fire and explosion of the steamer on March 19, 1911.

Mascot burned on the early Sunday morning of March 19, 1911, at Pekin, on the Lewis River, a small settlement near the mouth of the Lewis River. Mascot had not been able to reach Woodland for several months, but Captain Archie McNeill believed the water would be deep enough to make a run to the city on Saturday, March 18, 1911. Not sure of being able to reach Woodland, McNeill tied Mascot up at the Lewis River Transportation Company's warehouse at Pekin.

=== Start of the fire ===
The fire began at 4:00 a.m. the next morning. The Morning Oregonian was quick to blame Gene Olsen, Mascot's night watchman, mentioning him by name in its initial report. Supposedly Olsen, who was said to have worked for the company for just a week before the fire, had gone into the hold to start the fire under the boiler. Olsen turned on the oil, but then something went wrong, and the fire burst out of control. Olsen raised the alarm, and two firemen, who had been asleep, woke up and started the pumps.

=== Explosion of the oil tank ===
The oil tank then exploded and the vessel burst into flames. The crew had no choice but to jump into the river and swim to shore. Burning oil covered the water near the steamer but did not reach the dock area.

Ah Sing, the Chinese cook, nearly drowned but he was rescued by Elmer Jacobson, who has been described as either the purser or a fireman, who was then about 22 years of age.

One man was missing however, the 71 year-old steward, Frank (or Sydney) Illidge. He was last heard from when the crew were evacuation the boat. Illidge had heard the cries of "fire", and when the mate, George P. Foley, knocked at his door to alert him, Illidge asked "where is the fire?" Foley yelled back: "The boat’s on fire."

=== Loss amount and first investigation ===
The steamer and cargo were a total loss. Despite having been reconstructed recently at a cost reported to have been $30,000, Mascot was only insured for $5,000. An investigation held on March 21, 1911, by the U.S. Steamboat Inspection Service found that none of the officers of Mascot were to blame for the fire.

=== Search for the body ===
On March 25, 1911, Clarence Illidge son of the deceased steward, hired Fritz De Rock, a local diver, to search for his father's body. On March 31, 1911, efforts to find the body of Sydney Illidge were abandoned. Illidge had been born in Haggerston, near London, England, on December 1, 1839. He had come to Oregon with his parents at the age of 13.

=== Recovery of machinery ===
On March 25, 1911, the boiler was brought into Portland by scow and unloaded at Willamette Iron & Steele Works. The machinery was off-loaded at the Taylor Street dock. An examination of the boat's engines was ordered, they had cracked when the boat sank after the fire.

Some of Mascot’s machinery was sold on April 12, 1911.

=== Decision to not replace Mascot ===
After the destruction of Mascot, Undine was on the Lewis River route in its place, but Undine drew too much water to be operated on the river except at the times of the best water level. It reportedly would have cost about $25,000 to build a vessel of Mascot’s type, so consideration was given to building a freight-only vessel. With the elimination of staterooms and other passenger conveniences it was estimated that a freight and (perhaps) a day-passenger only boat could be built for $15,000.

The rail lines had taken up so much of the passenger business that it was doubtful that a replacement passenger vessel could be placed on the Lewis River route. The Lewis River Transportation Company decided not to replace Mascot.

=== Judgment in court ===
On October 10, 1911, a jury in Multnomah County Circuit court awarded $5,000 to the estate of Sydney Illidge, for negligence in causing the death of the steward.

== Historical remembrance ==
Captain Walter C. Monical, who had been a waiter on Mascot at the age of 15 in the early 1890s, became the master of the Veteran's Steamboatmen Association in 1943. Capt. W.A. Davis, formerly in charge of Mascot, attended the 1943 reunion of the Veteran Steamboatmen's Association.

A monument including a one-dimensional steel model of Mascot was set up in Woodland in 2009. A kerosene lantern from Mascot is in the collection of the North Clark County Historical Museum in Amboy, Washington.
