= Ramona (1892 sternwheeler) =

1892 sternwheeler

- Ramona moored at Salem, Oregon, during flood, sometime between 1895 and 1898, with smaller sternwheeler Gypsy alongside.

History
- Name: Ramona
- Route: Willamette River; Columbia River; Fraser River
- Launched: 1892, Portland, Oregon; rebuilt, 1896
- Out of service: 1920
- Identification: US #110964 (as launched); 111130 (as rebuilt)
- Fate: Sank on Fraser River, April 22, 1908

General characteristics
- Type: Riverine steamboat, passenger/freighter
- Tonnage: 177 gross (as launched); 250.79 (as rebuilt) / 114 registered (as launched); 208.76 (as rebuilt)
- Length: 100 ft (30.48 m) (as launched); 118.2 ft (36.03 m) (as rebuilt)
- Beam: 18 ft (5.49 m)(as launched); 25 ft (7.62 m) (as rebuilt)
- Depth: 5 ft (1.52 m)(as launched); 4.4 ft (1.34 m) (as rebuilt)
- Installed power: Twin single-cylinder horizontally mounted steam engines, 11.25" bore by 36" stroke.
- Propulsion: sternwheeler

The river sternwheeler Ramona operated from 1892 to 1908 on the Willamette River in Oregon, on the Stikine River running from Wrangell, Alaska into British Columbia, and the Fraser River, in British Columbia. This vessel should not be confused with the coastal steamship Ramona which also ran in Alaskan waters.

== Construction ==
Ramona was built at Portland, Oregon in 1892, and was reconstructed and enlarged in 1896. The vessel was built for the Graham steamboat line, formally called the Oregon City Transportation Company, but also known as the “Yellow Stack Line”. All the steamers of the line had names that ended in -ona: Latona, Ramona, Altona, Leona, Pomona, Oregona, and Grahamona.

Ramona was specially fitted for passenger service, and was reported to have the best cabin of any steamer operating on the Willamette.

== Willamette river service ==
From 1892 to 1898 Ramona was worked on the Willamette River. Until 1894, the vessel was run on the lower Willamette from Portland to Oregon City. After 1894 Ramona was transferred to service on the upper Willamette, that is, the portion of the river above Willamette Falls. For most of the first three years of operation, Captain A.J. Sprong was in command, with Horace Campbell serving as chief engineer and E. Wynkoop as purser.

One important landing on the Willamette was the Trade Street dock at Salem, Oregon, which was used by Ramona and other steamboats. By the late 1890s however the once-booming steamboat business at Salem was falling off, as railroads began carrying the agricultural product that had once been shipped on the river.

== Stikine river operations ==
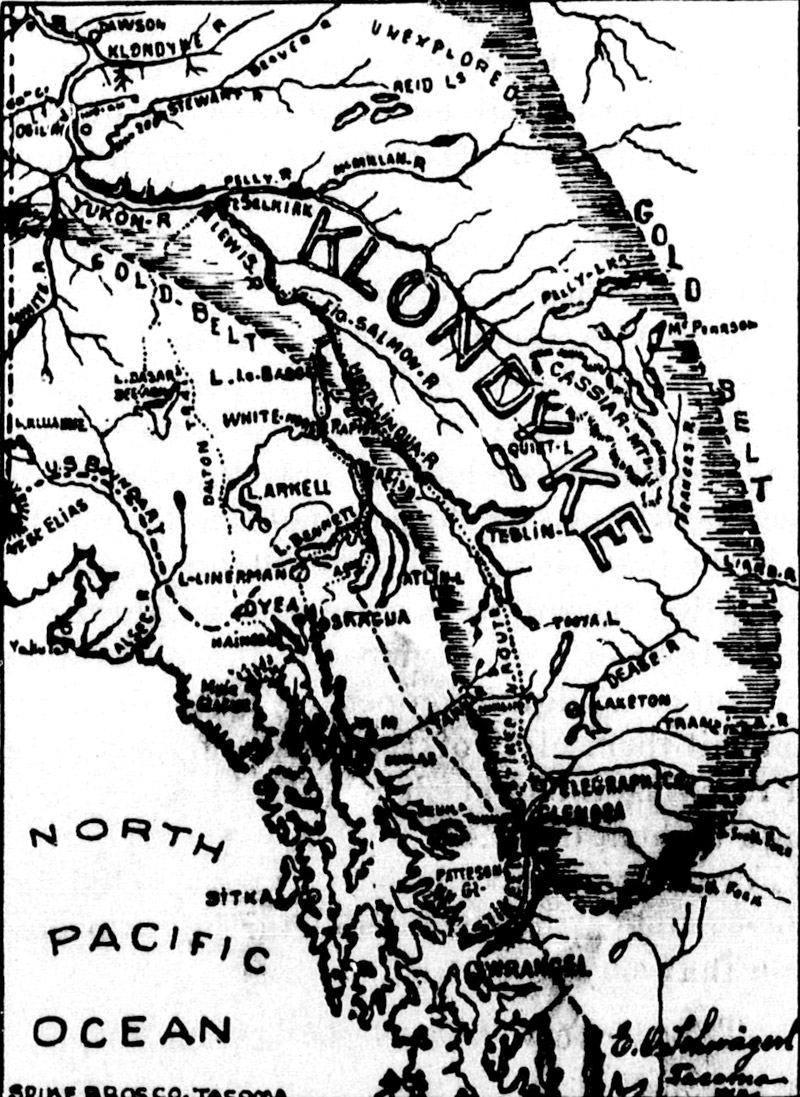
Booster map of 1898 showing claimed proximity of the "Gold Belt" to the Stikine river steamboat terminus.

In 1898, with the coming of the Alaska Gold Rush, Ramona was sent north to Alaska to run on the Stikine River, where there was an effort being made to develop an alternative "All-Canadian" route to the Klondike gold fields. Ramona went aground on the Stikine and had to be towed off by the Canadian Pacific Railway 's sternwheeler Ogilvie. This was a common type of experience on the Stikine, which was a difficult river to navigate. By the summer of 1898, the Stikine route had failed due to the extreme difficulty of reaching gold fields overland from the steamboat terminus.

== Fraser river service ==
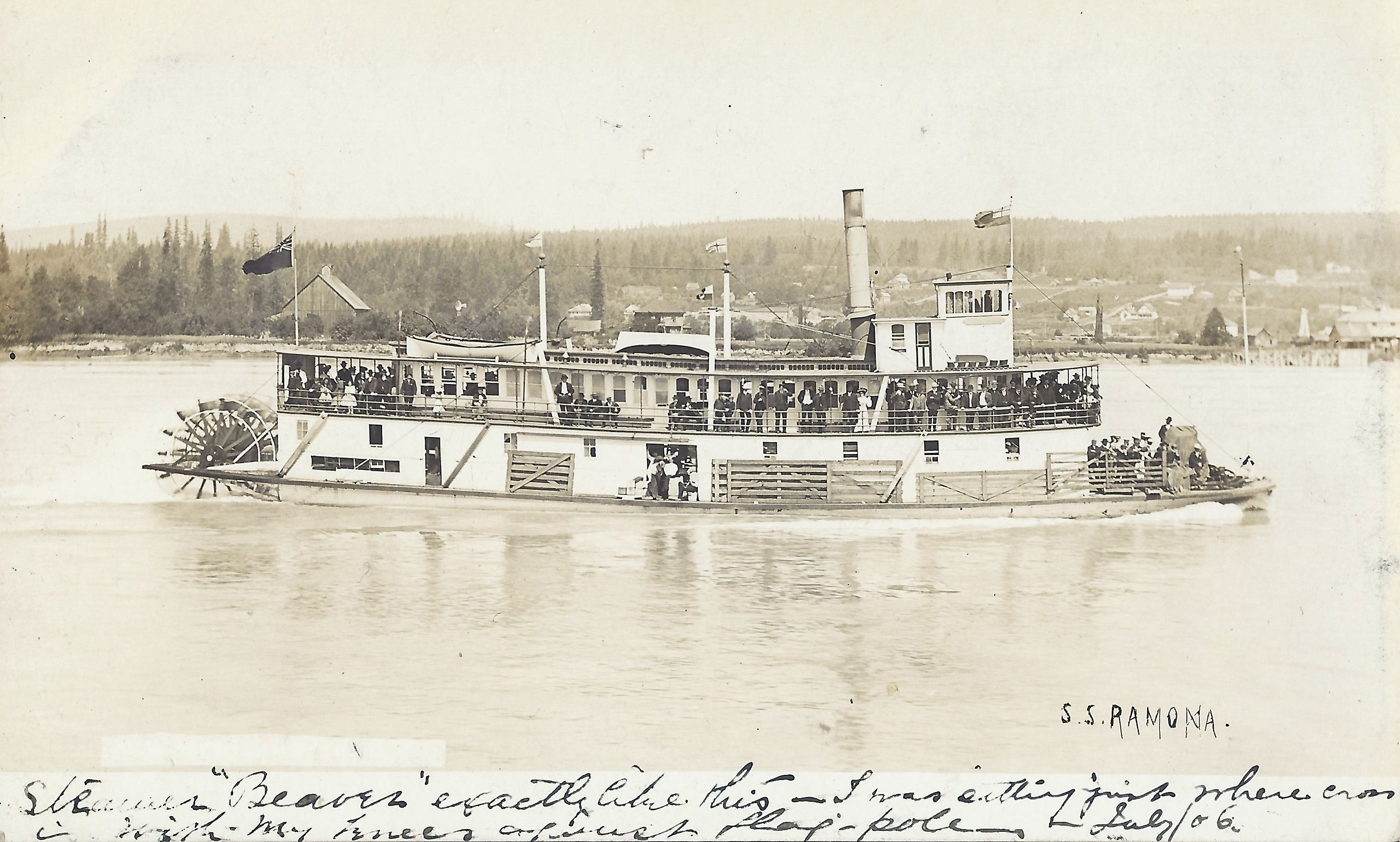
Ramona in service on the Fraser River.

Ramona was transferred to the Fraser River to replace the steamer Edgar. On April 17, 1901, while in service on the Fraser River, Ramona's boiler exploded, killing at least four people. The incident occurred at Fort Langley. Two were mothers who had gone on deck for fresh air. They were blown off the boat into the river where they presumably drowned. They had both left their babies in the main cabin; these infants were unharmed. Two deckhands were killed by flying pieces of the boiler. Contemporaneous reports stated that seven additional people suffered what appeared to be fatal injuries.

== Disposition ==
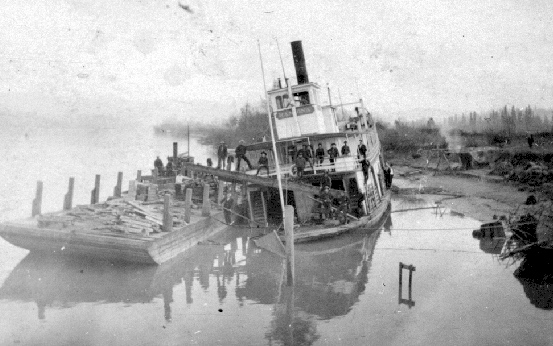
Ramona aground at McKay's Landing on the Fraser River. A barge is alongside, apparently either transferring cargo or assisting in salvage.

Ramona was repaired following the boiler explosion and returned to service. In October 1903 Ramona struck the Mission railway bridge, but was again repaired and returned to service. Ramona sank on April 22, 1908, at Wharton's Landing near the mouth of the Harrison River. The report of the Canadian steamboat inspector summarized the incident:

April 22, 1909. Steamship Ramona, plying on Fraser river, while returning to New Westminster, when near Wharton's landing, ran on a snag, striking her amidship on port side. She immediately sank becoming a total loss.

Historian Affleck stated that Ramona was "an accident-prone steamer."
