= Governor Newell (sternwheeler) =

American steamboat

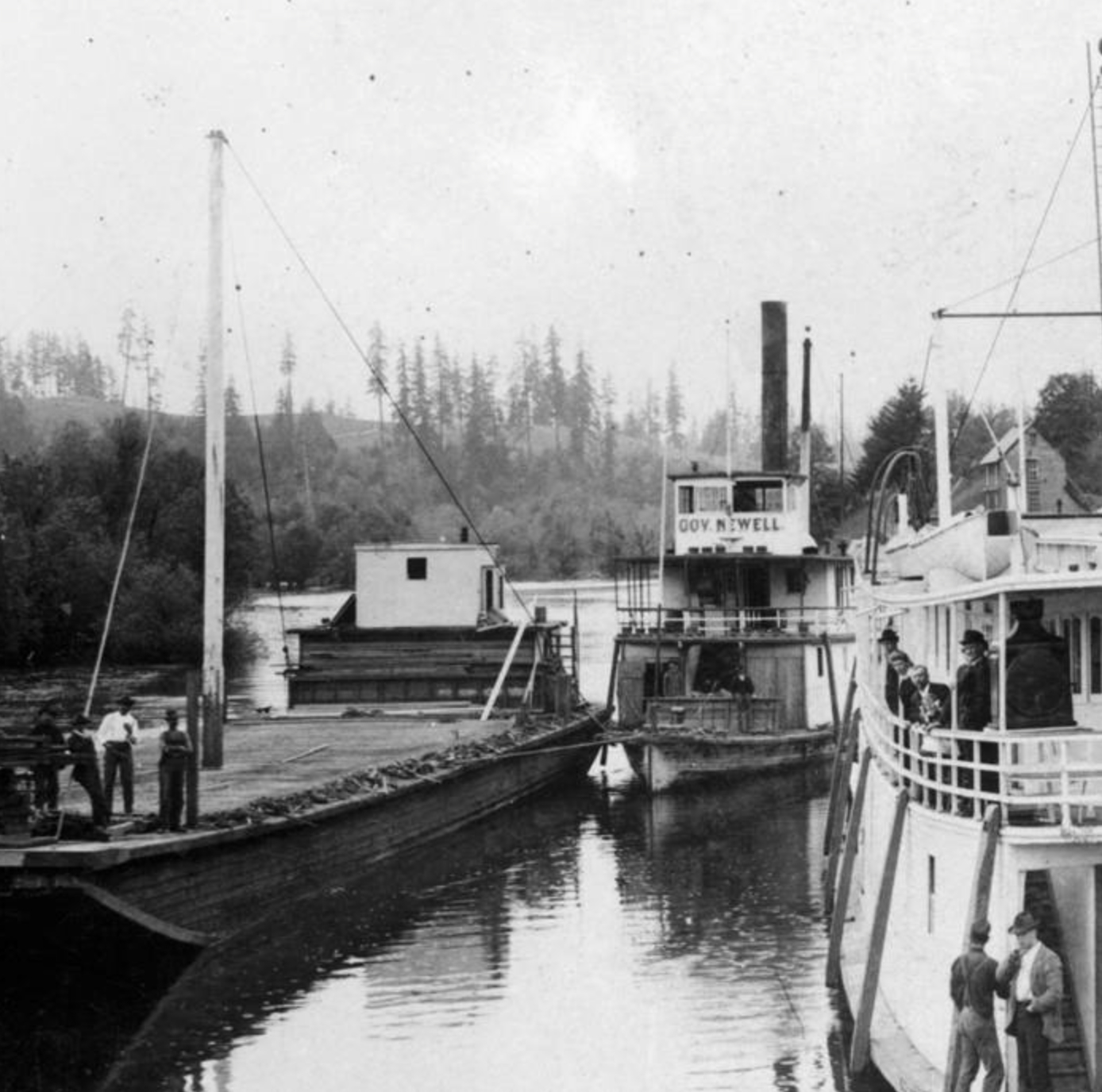
- Gov. Newell (center), at La Center, Washington, May 13, 1900. Sternwheeler Mascot on right.

History
- Name: Governor Newell
- Owner: Shoalwater Bay Transportation Co.; John Corse Trullinger; Charles O. and Minnie M. Hill
- Route: Willapa Bay, Grays Harbor, Chehalis River, lower Columbia and lower Willamette River, Lewis River
- Maiden voyage: August 26, 1883
- Out of service: 1900
- Identification: U.S. #85806
- Fate: Dismantled
- Notes: Cabin structure and portions of machinery used in construction of sternwheeler Paloma.

General characteristics
- Type: Inland all-purpose
- Length: 111 ft (33.83 m)
- Beam: 20 ft (6.10 m)
- Depth: 5.0 ft (1.52 m) depth of hold
- Installed power: twin steam engines, horizontally mounted, cylinder bore 12 in (304.8 mm) and stroke of 4 ft (1.22 m); wood-fired boiler
- Crew: Five (in towing work)

Governor Newell was a sternwheel-driven steamboat that operated from 1883 to 1902 in the Pacific Northwest.

Gov. Newell was owned by Capt. Charles Oliver Hill (1853–1944), whose wife, Minnie Hill was the first woman west of the Mississippi river to hold a steamboat captain's license.

Gov. Newell was named after William A. Newell, governor of the Washington Territory from 1880 to 1884.

== Construction ==
Gov. Newell was built at Portland, Oregon for the Shoalwater Transportation Company, making its trial trip on August 26, 1883, under the command of Capt.James P. Whitcomb (1824–1901).

Gov. Newell was fitted out by the Shoalwater Bay Transportation Company. Louis Alfred Loomis, later the founder of the Ilwaco Railway and Navigation Company, was president of the company in April 1883.

Capt. William H. Clough was also a member of Shoalwater Bay Transportation Co. Perry Scott, brother of famous steamboat captain Uriah Bonser Scott, assisted in the fitting out of Gov. Newell.

== Dimensions ==
Gov. Newell was 111 ft (33.83 m) long exclusive of the extension of the main deck, called the "fantail" on which the sternwheel was mounted. The boat had a beam of 20 ft (6.10 m), exclusive of the protective timbers running outside of the top of the sides of the hull called guards. Gov. Newell had a depth of hold of 5.0 ft (1.52 m).

The overall size of the vessel was 203.87 gross tons (a unit of volume, not weight) and 134.41 registered tons.

The official merchant vessel registry number was 85806.

== Engineering ==
Steam for the engines of Gov. Newell was generated by a wood-fired boiler. When engaged in towing work, Gov. Newell could be handled with the captain, a mate, the engineer, and two firemen. Power was generated by twin steam engines, horizontally mounted, cylinder bore 12 in (304.8 mm) and stroke of 4 ft (1.22 m).

== Early career ==
Gov. Newell was sent down to Astoria, Oregon, where on September 7, 1883, the steamer made a trial trip from Astoria to Knappa, Oregon, starting at about 11:00 a.m. On board were Capt. John Henry Dix ("J.H.D") Gray, lumber mill owner John Corse Trullinger, and other local dignitaries. According to a report in the Daily Astorian, the Gov. Newell "goes to Gray’s harbor on the first favorable opportunity, where a profitable trade awaits her."

Gov. Newell did not serve long on Willapa Bay, then known as Shoalwater Bay. The Shoalwater Bay Transportation Company decided to transfer Gov. Newell to Grays Harbor.

In May 1885, Gov. Newell had a contract to carry the mail on a route from Aberdeen, W.T. up the Chehalis River. Capt. James P. Whitcomb (1824–1901) was master of Gov. Newell on the mail run between Montesano, Washington and Westport, Washington, as was his son, Capt. George A. Whitcomb (1854–1939). Westport was then known as Peterson's Point. William H. Clough was the boat's engineer at the time. Gov. Newell proved to be not profitable on Grays Harbor.

In 1885 Gov Newell was returned to the Columbia River, where it was operated for a short time by Capt. Charles Haskell.

In July 1886, there was talk of lining Gov. Newell upriver through the Cascades Rapids to operate the boat in opposition to the boats of the Oregon Railway and Navigation Company, which was apparently taking away too much business from Gov. Newell and an associated vessel, Lurline, at the mouth of the Columbia river.

John C. Trullinger bought Gov. Newell in 1887. Capt. Perry A. Trullinger, son of John C Trullinger, ran the boat briefly on the route from Astoria to Westport, Oregon.

By August 1887, Gov. Newell was carrying Sunday excursions out of Astoria, Oregon.

In late November 1887, Gov. Newell was hired to tow the burned hulk of the elite steamer Telephone back to Portland from Astoria, where Telephone had been nearly destroyed by fire.

== Sabotage allegations ==
In January 1887, Gov. Newell was owned by John Corse Trullinger (1828–1901). Trullinger had hired John Cox to act as captain of Gov. Newell. In a bitter argument that month after Newell had sustained some damage towing a ship downriver to Astoria, Trullinger accused Cox of trying to sink Gov. Newell on behalf of the powerful Oregon Railway and Navigation Company. Trullinger withheld Cox's wages, but Trullinger's accusation was found in subsequent litigation to be baseless.

== Sale to Charles and Minnie Hill ==
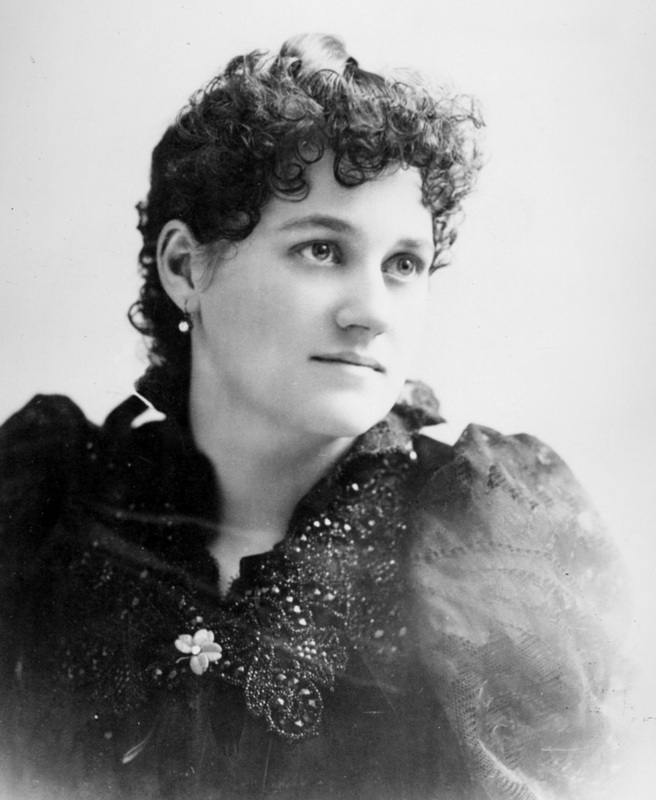
Capt. Minnie Hill, circa 1886

In May 1888 Gov. Newell was for sale. The steamer was purchased for $7,500 by a husband and wife team of steamboat captains, Charles O. and Minnie Hill.

The Hills had raised the money themselves from successful trading operations on the Columbia river, starting from small steamers and working up.

Minnie Hill was the first woman west of the Mississippi river to hold a steamboat captain's license, which she obtained on November 30, 1887.

On Gov. Newell, Charles ran the engineering department while Minnie steered the boat from the pilot house. In addition to navigating the boat, Minnie Hill ran a general merchandise store on the upper deck, where she was reportedly an "excellent hand at making a shrewd bargain."

In October 1889 Gov. Newell was in operation on the lower Columbia river, bringing barges down to Astoria.

== Later operations ==
James D. Miller, a well-known steamboat captain, served on Gov. Newell during 1891–92.

On September 24, 1893, when a fire broke out the Pacific Coast grain elevator in Portland, Oregon, and two ships loading grain were moored at the elevator's dock were threatened with destruction, Gov. Newell and the sternwheeler Wm. G. Hoag pushed them out away from the docks, saving the ships.

In September 1895, the Hills, on Gov. Newell, were buying fish in the Columbia River, near the mouth of the Cowlitz River.

In early July 1897, when the Vancouver ferry was out of service for several days, its place was taken by Gov. Newell. Gov. Newell could carry passengers, but there were complaints by drovers because the steamer could not accommodate teams.

== Alienation of affections lawsuit ==
In early 1896, Frederick Clifford Mossman and his wife, Jennie May, were living on the Gov. Newell. Jennie May Mossman was reported in newspaper reports of the time to have been the sister of Capt. Minnie Hill.

Some months later, Frederick Mossman brought suit against Charles O. Hill, alleging that Hill had alienated the affections of Mossman's wife. Specifically, Mossman sought $25,000 from Hill, claiming that "his wife was induced to be unfaithful to her marriage vow, through the arts, flattery and persuasion of the defendant" on account of which Mossman claimed to have "suffered great mental distress and that his happy home and the honor and good name of his family have been forever ruined."

In defense, Charles O. Hill admitted that he had had improper relations with Jennie May Mossman, but it was she who tempted him rather than the other way around, and that the whole affair was an attempt by the Mossmans to get Hill to pay them a large amount of money. The case went to trial in July 1896. Capt. Minnie Hill was in San Francisco, California at the time of the trial.

== Disposition ==
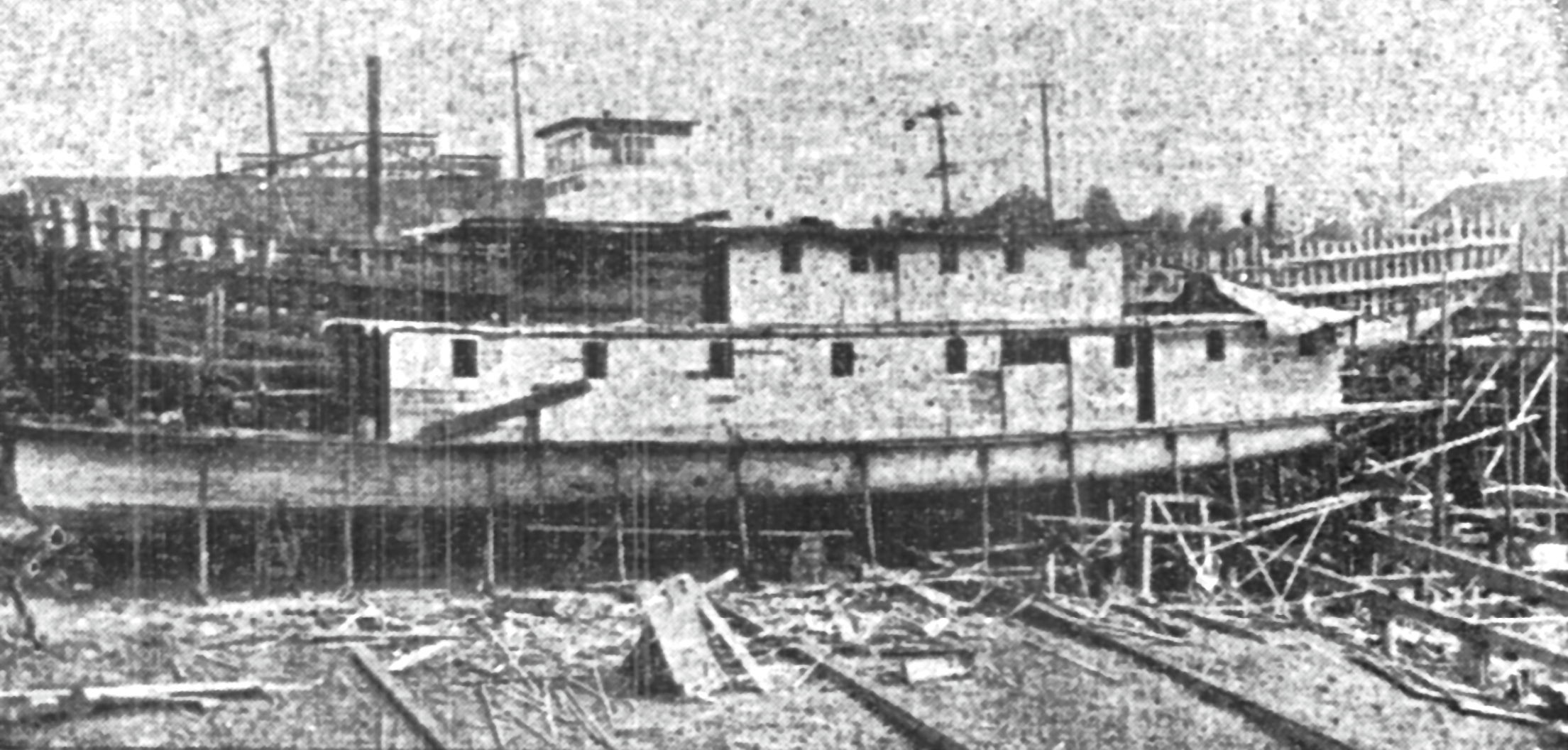
Gov. Newell in shipyard in Portland, Oregon, April 7, 1902.

According to a non-contemporaneous source, Gov. Newell was abandoned in 1900. According to a contemporaneous newspaper account, in 1902 Charles O. Hill, owner of Gov. Newell, had a new sternwheeler built at Johnson's shipyard in Portland. Engines for the new steamer were to come from Gov. Newell.

The new boat, which included the cabin structure and some of the machinery of Gov. Newell, was named Paloma.

Captain Hill moored old hull of Gov. Newell at the foot of East Madison Street, where it eventually sank. Sediment washed down in floods covered the old hulk, and by 1911 it had become a significant obstacle to harbor dredging operations.
