= Pomona (sternwheeler) =

American steamboat

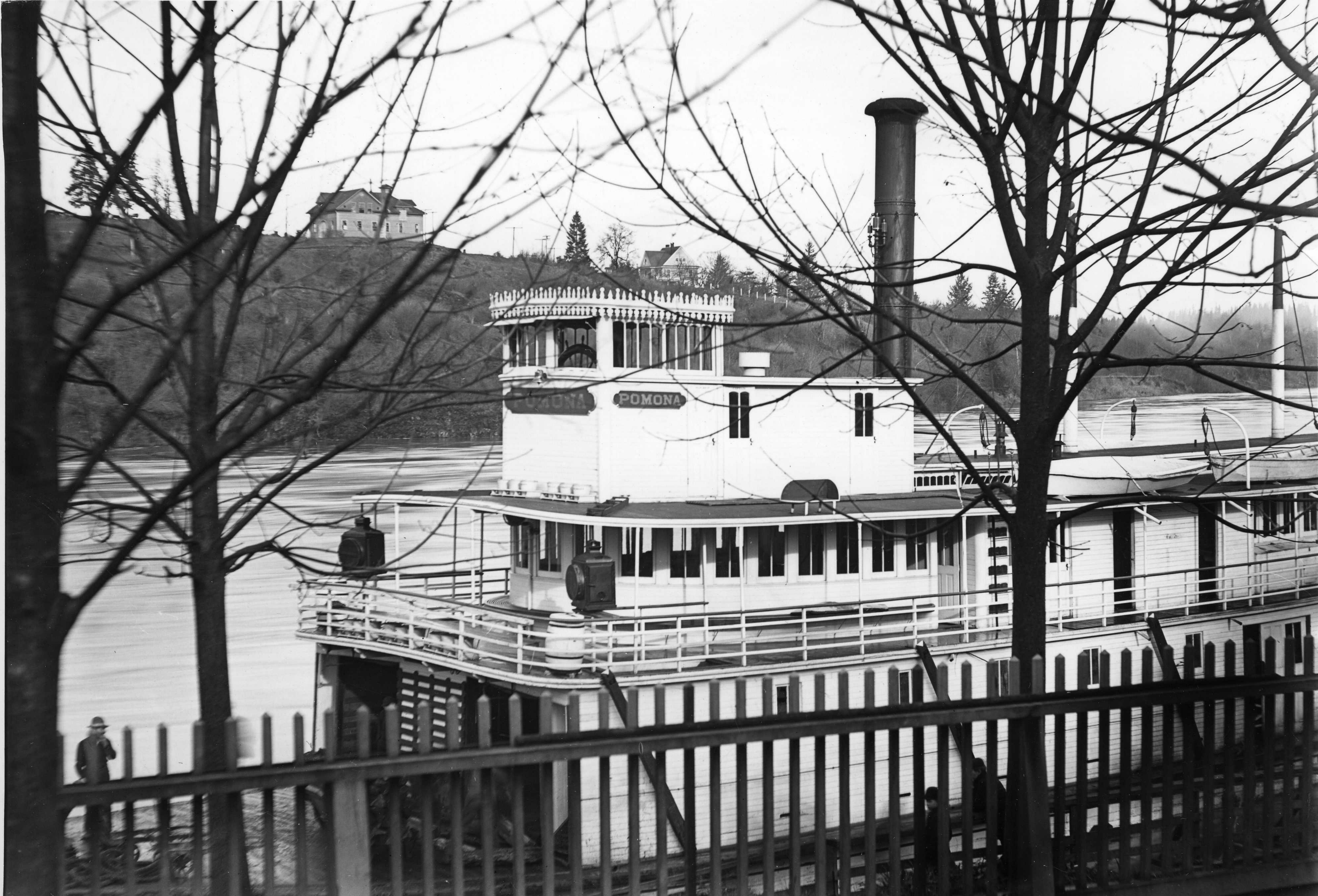
- Pomona at the 8th Street dock in Oregon City circa 1890.

History
- Name: Pomona
- Owner: Oregon City Transport Co.; Willamette Navigation Co.; Cowlitz Towing Co.; Knappton Towing Co.
- Route: Willamette River
- Builder: Portland Shipbuilding Co.
- Completed: 1898, at Portland, Oregon; rebuilt 1926
- Out of service: 1940
- Identification: U.S. Steamboat registry #150782
- Fate: Rebuilt in 1926; converted to unpowered floating workshop in 1940

General characteristics
- Class & type: riverine passenger/freight
- Tonnage: Original: 365 gross; 295 net tons; after 1926 rebuild: 216 gross and 120 net tons.
- Length: 133.5 ft (40.7 m) measured over hull.
- Beam: 28.4 ft 9 in (8.9 m) measured over hull.
- Draft: 15 in (381.0 mm)
- Depth: 6.1 ft 0 in (1.86 m)
- Installed power: originally installed: twin steam engines, horizontally mounted, each with a bore of 12 in (304.8 mm) and stroke of 4 ft (1.22 m)
- Propulsion: sternwheel
- Capacity: Known to carry 200 passengers prior to rebuild.

Pomona was a steamboat which operated on the Willamette, Columbia and Cowlitz rivers from 1898 to 1940. Pomona was specially designed to operate in low water conditions such as typically prevailed in the summer months in Oregon. Pomona was one of the few steamers that could regularly navigate to Corvallis, Oregon, which was the practical head of navigation on the Willamette. In 1926, Pomona was substantially rebuilt, and served afterwards as a towboat. In 1940, Pomona was converted into an unpowered floating storehouse.

== Design, construction and dimensions ==
Pomona was built for the Oregon City Transportation Company ("O.C.T.C."), which had been organized by the Graham family in 1889.

O.C.T.C. owned two other boats at the time, the Ramona and the Altona. The Pomona was larger than both. Pomona was built especially for the summer season on the Willamette River, when the water would be at its lowest. Pomona drew only 15 in (381.0 mm) and was said to have been "an ideal boat for the low water season." The boat was intended to carry passengers and handle the large freight business of the O.C.T.C.

Pomona was built by the Portland Shipbuilding Company at its yard at the foot of Meade Street. According to a contemporaneous report, the steamer was 130 feet long Pomona had a beam of 26 feet and a depth of hold of 4.5 feet. Passenger accommodations consisted of a day cabin and five staterooms.

According to the 1899 official steamboat registry, Pomona was 133.5 ft (40.7 m) long, with a beam of 28.4 ft 9 in (8.9 m) and depth of hold of 6.1 ft 9 in (2.1 m). Typical vessel dimensions given in sources did not include the deck extension over the stern on which the sternwheel was mounted, nor did they measure the beam (width) of the vessel over the often wide overhanging heavy timbers, called "guards" that were installed along the top of the hull to protect it from damage.

The official steamboat registry number was 150782.

== Engineering ==
Pomona’s sternwheel was turned by twin horizontally-mounted steam engines, each with a 12 in (304.8 mm) and stroke of 4 ft (1.22 m). The boiler was to generate steam at the pressure of 200 pounds per square inch. All the machinery was installed in the vessel prior to launch.

== Wood fuel ==
The boiler was wood-fired, at least until 1911. Pomona used one cord of wood on a round trip to Oregon City. In 1911, this was comparable to the cost of oil fueled steamers.

There were different kinds of wood used to fuel steamboats. Split wood was generally considered the best, but it was the most expensive. Slab wood was the remains from the squaring-off of logs at saw mills. It tended to have a lot of bark and was considered inferior to split wood.

However, because wood other than mill products was too expensive in 1911 in the Portland area, O.C.T.C. ordered 500 cords of slab wood, to be burned by Pomona and the company's other boats on the Portland-Oregon City route. Pomona had not burned slab wood before, and it was unknown how the vessel would steam with it.

Split wood was cheaper on the upper Willamette, available at $2.50 a cord, compared to $4.50 a cord in the Portland area. In July 1911, Capt. Arthur W. Graham, one of the owners of O.C.T.C., was traveling along the upper Willamette to arrange for the positioning of 1000 cords of split wood along the river for use by the company's steamboats.

Conversion to oil fuel would not work for Pomona, because on the Corvallis run, they would have to fill the tanks with sufficient fuel to make the round trip, and this would sink the boat down in the water, making it more difficult to reach points on the upper river, particularly during low water.

== The Willamette River route ==
Willamette River Distances from mouth
Location	Distance
Portland (Steel Bridge)	12 mi (19 km)
Milwaukie	19 mi (31 km)
Clackamas River	25 mi (40 km)
Oregon City (Willamette Falls)	27 mi (43 km)
Canemah	28 mi (45 km)
Tualatin River	29 mi (47 km)
Butteville	42 mi (68 km)
Champoeg	46 mi (74 km)
Yamhill River	55 mi (89 km)
Carey Bend	58 mi (93 km)
Tompkins Bar	69 mi (111 km)
Darrow Chute	80 mi (130 km)
Salem	85 mi (137 km)
Gray Eagle Bar	89 mi (143 km)
Independence	96 mi (154 km)
Santiam River	108 mi (174 km)
Black Dog Bar	112 mi (180 km)
Albany	120 mi (190 km)
Corvallis	132 mi (212 km)
Kiger Island	135 mi (217 km)
Norwood Island	150 mi (240 km)
Harrisburg	163 mi (262 km)
Eugene	185 mi (298 km)

The Willamette River runs south from its juncture with the Columbia River through the Willamette Valley. The most populous cities of the state of Oregon, as well as its most successful farming regions, are along the Willamette.

== Service on the Willamette ==
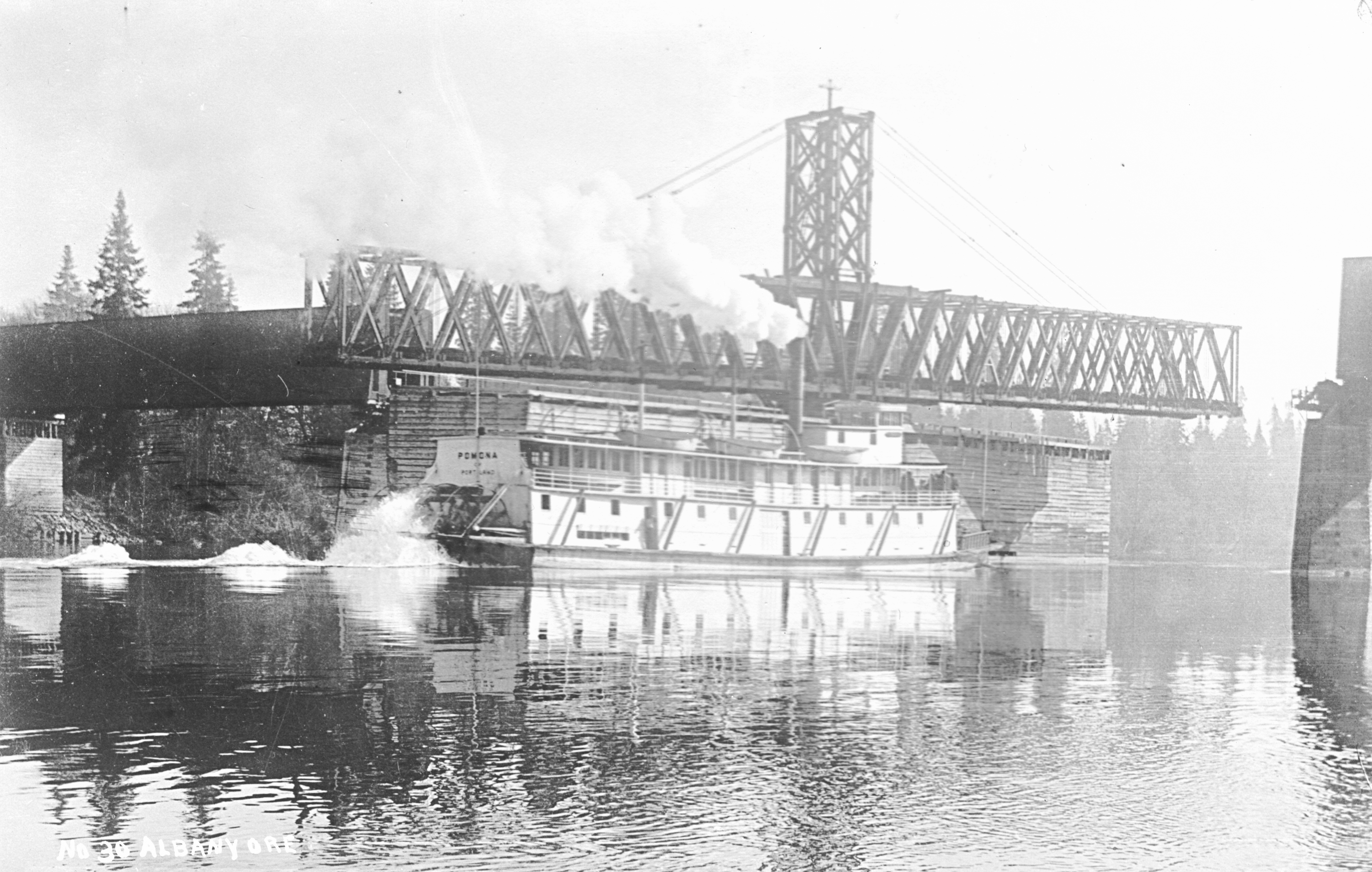
Pomona passing under the Corvallis and Eastern Railroad bridge at Albany, Oregon.

Pomona made its initial trip on Saturday, July 16, 1898, arriving at Salem before 7:00 p.m., and returning to Portland the following morning. The steamer proceeded further downriver to Independence, where its arrival was met by a brass band and many citizens. At this time, the level of the water in the Willamette was 1.2 feet above the low water mark. Pomona encountered no difficulties in the initial trip.

By August 17, 1898, Pomona was making regular runs from Salem north to Portland, departing every Monday, Wednesday and Friday at 7:45 a.m. from Salem at the dock between State and Court Streets. M.P. Baldwin was the agent in Salem.

The schedule was quickly changed, so that Pomona would leave Salem for Portland every day except Sundays at 7:00 a.m. On Tuesday, August 23, 1898, Pomona carried the first hop pickers of the season upriver from Portland to the Willamette Valley. Pickers in that season were to be paid 40 cents for every nine-bushel box picked.

Rising waters in the Willamette in the fall permitted Pomona to navigate further upriver, and by November 7, 1898, Pomona was running to Independence.

=== Drowned passenger ===
On February 20, 1899, a woman, identified as Mrs. Howe, of Gresham, Oregon, fell overboard from Pomona and drowned. The incident occurred before dawn, when the steamers Lurline, Undine, and Pomona were rafted together at Portland, with Pomona on the outside and Undine in the middle. Just before Pomona was to depart for Salem, Mrs. Howe, who was intended to visit a son in Salem, crossed over Lurline, then went on to Undine.

The bow of Pomona was a considerable distance away from the Undine, but at the stern the two vessels were still in contact at the wide heavy timbers along the edges of the hulls called "guards". Mrs. Howe safely crossed onto Pomona, but then stepped back to speak with a companion, took one step too far, and fell into the water and disappeared, despite efforts to save her. Her body was found about half an hour later under the wheel of the Undine. By then, Pomona had already departed for Salem.

=== Race with Elmore ===
On Monday, July 4, 1899, Pomona departed for Portland from Salem at 7:00 a.m. Elmore, a rival vessel belonging to the Oregon Railway and Navigation Company then immediately cast off. Elmore, decorated with flags and bunting to mark Independence Day, carried a small saluting cannon on the forward deck, and as Elmore entered the channel, the cannon was fired off. The two vessels raced out of Salem and were neck and neck as they departed the city. Pomona was the first to reach the locks at Oregon City. Pomona however was delayed at the locks, and Elmore was able to pass through first. With this advantage, Elmore was able to beat Pomona into Portland.

=== Landing at Eola on the Rickreall ===
On December 13, 1899, Pomona ran up the Rickreall River (now known as the Rickreall Creek) to Eola, Oregon, where 293 bales of hops were loaded on board. Eola once had been a potentially important steamboat landing, although its use was largely restricted to times of high water when the boats could reach the town. The town however had been languishing since the 1880s, and riverfront facilities were mostly destroyed in the flood of 1890.

Pomona made its December 1899 landing at the former Wm. Jones warehouse, from which 25 years previously all the wheat from the surrounding area had been shipped to market. It was reported that all the people at Eola came out to see the steamer and that "many an old timer, who had in the early days built great air castles for the future greatness of Eola, dropped a silent tear in contemplation of what might have been."

=== Excursion to Champoeg memorial ===
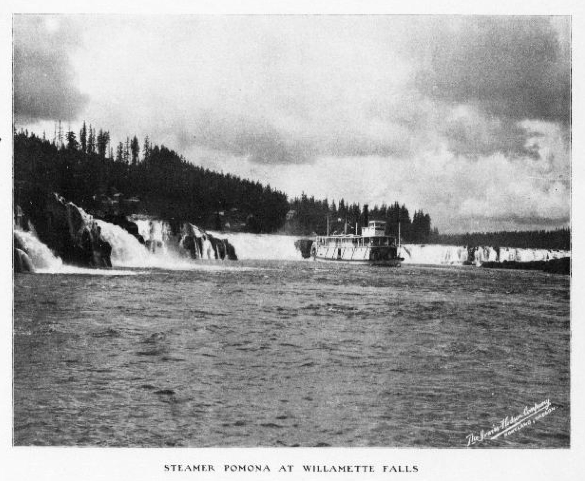
Pomona in 1901 at Willamette Falls.

On May 2, 1901, Pomona transported people from Salem to the site of the former provisional territorial capital at Champoeg for the dedication of a monument to the pioneers of 1843 who had set up the provisional government. Pomona left Salem just after 3:00 p.m. bound for Champoeg with 200 passengers on board. Among the passengers were a large number of notable persons, including Supreme Court Justices Robert S. Bean and Charles E. Wolverton, State Treasurer Charles S. Moore, Secretary of State Frank L. Dunbar, and others.

=== Struck snag and sank ===
On Monday, December 28, 1903, while en route on the Willamette River from Corvallis to Portland, near a place called Carey's Bend, Pomona struck a submerged snag and sank. Carey's Bend was located about 45 miles south of Portland.

Pomona had been coming downriver from Corvallis with Captain Spong in command. A good number of passengers were on board and a good list of cargo. At 2:30 pm, the steamer reached Carey's Bend and there ran into the snag, which pierced the hull, sinking the vessel. Fortunately the water was shallow at that point in the river, and the steamer was only submerged up to the lower deck. All passengers simply moved to the upper deck without even getting wet.

About two hours later, the sternwheeler Leona, also owned by the O.C.T.C., came along, and after standing by a while, took off the passengers from Pomona and brought them downriver to Portland. Damage to the steamer was estimated at $500. Damage to cargo was reported to have been $100.

=== Salvage arrangements ===
Arrangements were made the day after the sinking to dispatch wrecking barges with pumps and other salvage apparatus upriver to raise the Pomona and bring it down to Portland for repairs. Corvallis could only be reached by two shallow draft steamboats, Pomona and Altona, both owned by O.C.T.C.

Altona however had been damaged the previous Wednesday in a collision with the Oregon Railway and Navigation Company's steamer Modoc. Altona had been taken to Portland Shipbuilding Co. for repairs, and was not expected to be returned to service until Saturday, January 2, 1904.

With both Altona and Pomona out of service, O.C.T.C was required to suspend service to Corvallis. The smaller Latona had to carry all the company's business upriver from Portland, and was not expected to proceed further south than Salem. It turned out however that Latona was able to proceed as far south as Independence.

On Sunday, January 3, 1904, at about 1:30 p.m., Pomona was refloated. Pomona was able to raise steam and proceed down river under its own power to the Portland Shipbuilding Company's yard for repairs, arriving at 7:00 p.m. that evening. There turned out to have been two holes in the hull, one of which was about 15 feet long. To refloat the boat, the holes had been covered with canvas, and the hull pumped out.

=== Saved from fire in Portland ===
On October 4, 1905, Pomona and Altona were moored in Portland when a large fire broke out nearby along the waterfront. The apparent origin of the fire was a pile of oiled rags in the basement of the New Era Paint and Varnish Works. Fueled by the varnish works, the fire destroyed an entire block of the city. Pomona and Altona were able to escape damage by being moved out into the river. As soon as this was done, the Portland fireboat moved in and was able to save from destruction the docks of the O.C.T.C and the Joseph Kellogg Transportation Company.

=== Grounding at the mouth of the Santiam ===
On Saturday night, June 1, 1907, while en route from Corvallis to Portland, Pomona ran aground at the mouth of the Santiam River. Pomona remained grounded until Monday, June 3, 1907, when it was pulled off into deeper water by the government snag boat Mathloma. Damage to Pomona was only slight, and consisted of a broken capstan and some minor damage to the hull.

The water in the Willamette at the time of the grounding was low, and boats were having a difficult time reaching landings upriver from Salem. They often had to "line" over shallow spots. Lining consisted of running a strong cable out from the bow of the steamboat to a large rock or tree along the riverbank, and then, using the steam-powered capstan, cranking the cable in, thus dragging the steamer across sand bars and similar shallow sections of the river. Lining over a rocky riverbed could damage the hull.

In these conditions, O.C.T.C. decided to put Oregona on the Portland-Corvallis route, in place of Pomona, running on a "three-day" schedule. Oregona would run south from Portland on Tuesdays and Saturdays and depart downriver on Wednesdays and Mondays.

=== Struck rock and sank ===
Early in the morning on March 25, 1909, in heavy fog, Pomona struck a rock near Milwaukie, Oregon, and sank. Pomona was then under the command of Captain Chris Pihum. The boat had been proceeding slowly, when a fog completely blocked off vision and then hit the obstruction known as "Milwaukie Reef", sinking in 15 feet of water. There were no passengers on board at the time.

There had not been a sinking of a river vessel on the Willamette for several years, and it was considered surprising as both the crew and the captain of Pomona were highly experienced. The damage was limited to a tear i the hull, and O.C.T.C. planned to raise the vessel. No one was injured, and there was no damage to the cargo. The estimated damage to the steamer was $1,000.

=== Service suspended for lock work ===
On June 20, 1911, the O.C.T.C. announced that it would suspend steamboat service to points above the Willamette falls from August 1 (or late July) to October 1. The reason for the suspension was that the Willamette Falls Locks would be closed for improvement works during that time. The lock work was intended to deepen the channel.

Normally water transport to Corvallis was suspended by June 6 because of low water, but the company had kept Pomona on the Portland-Corvallis run until June 24 to meet increased business. While the locks were closed, Pomona would run between Portland and Oregon City, making two trips daily, leaving Portland at 8 a.m. and 2 p.m., and Oregon City at 11:00 a.m. and 5:00 p.m., and making three trips on Sunday.

It was anticipated that suspension of steamboat service would harm the hops growers along the river. Hop-picking would be at its height during the suspension, and pickers, who had used the steamboat for transportation, would have to use the train and then walk or be driven to fields that were distant from land transportation lines.

=== Damaged in locks ===
On the afternoon of Friday, November 15, 1912, Pomona was seriously damaged while passing through the Willamette Falls Locks heading downriver. As the steamer was passing through the locks, it became hung up on a bolt projecting from the lock wall. The vessel broke free as the water receded, but there was serious damage to the deck beams, guards and other components.

The locks and been sold to the government by the Portland Railway, Light & Power Company, and O.C.T.C. blamed the incident of poor maintenance of the locks by the government since the sale. Pomona was taken to the Joseph Supple yard in Portland for repairs.

=== Government takes over the locks ===
According to a non-contemporaneous account, the government took over the locks in 1915, in response to a demand for a toll-free passage around Willamette Falls. Although the toll-free river was promoted as being a stimulus to river traffic, this did not turn out to be the case. The principal users of the locks continued to be O.C.T.C, with its boats Pomona, Grahamona, and Oregona, and barges carrying cord wood fuel down to Portland.

== Business falls off ==
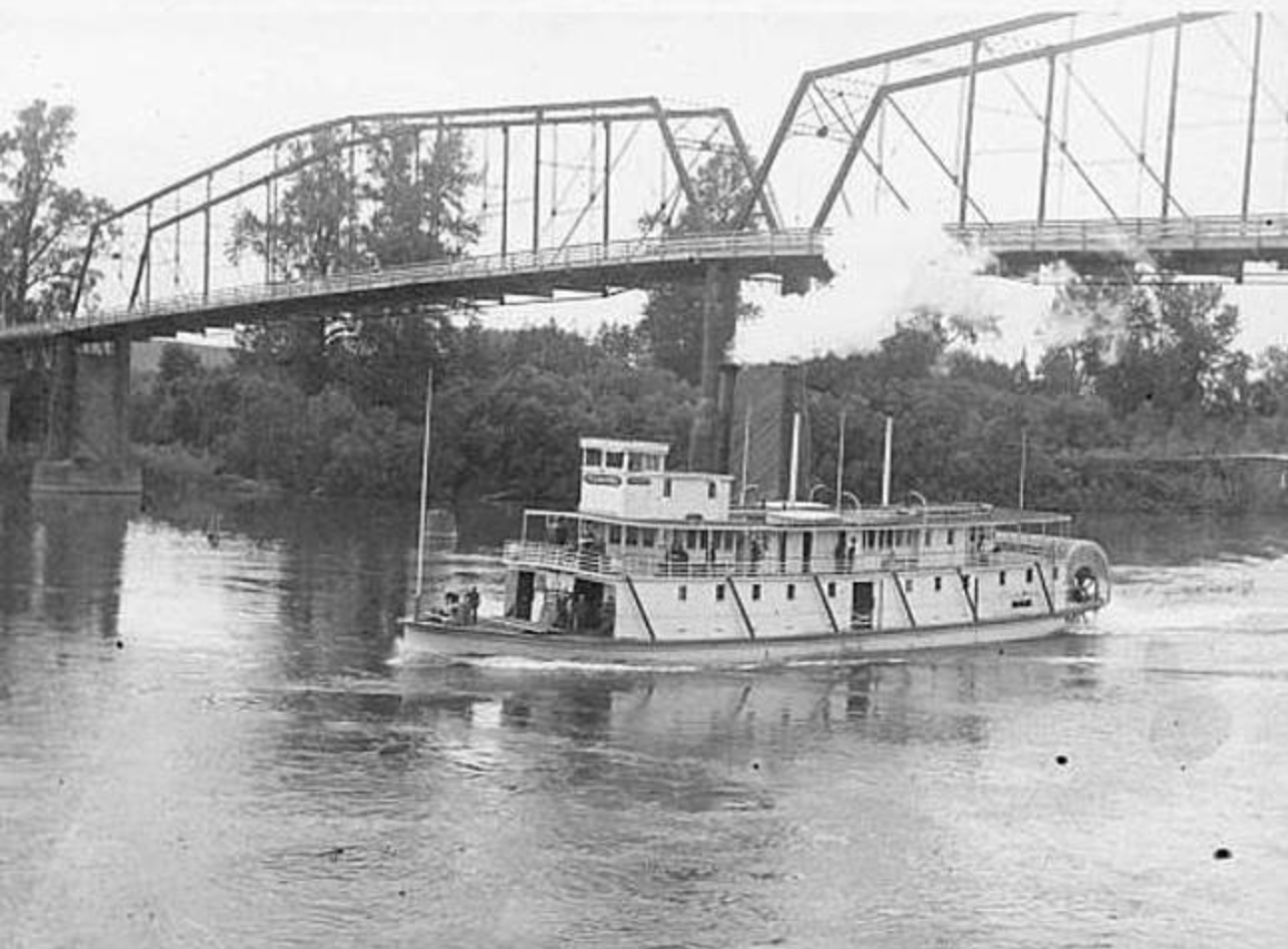
Pomona under the Steel Bridge at Salem, Oregon, sometime between 1898 and 1918.

By 1914, business on the Willamette River had fallen off sharply. Only 5 percent of the freight shipped from the region went by water. There was little support among the business community for proposed expensive dredging operations on the Willamette. However, the government was then in the process of purchasing the Willamette Falls Locks.

Captain A.B. Graham of O.C.T.C. was quoted in February 1914:

When we started the Yellow Stack Line there were 15 steamers on the Willamette in the trade; now the steamer Grahamona takes care of every pound of freight moving by water. As a result we see no future for three steamers and are prepared to sell either the Oregona or Pomona. There is nothing to indicate, in my mind, that free locks will better the situation. It appears to me as if the Upper Willamette trade will die, as did that on the Upper Columbia, for after the Open River Transportation Company forced wholesale reductions in rail rates, the shippers patronized the railroads and killed the water line.

=== Operations on the Yamhill River ===
Pomona’s shallow draft allowed it to navigate the Yamhill River. Under Capt. Clyde Raabe (b.1878) Pomona hauled the last freight cargo out of McMinnville, Oregon, a town located on the Yamhill. Similarly, Captain Raabe also was in charge of Pomona when the last load of oats was shipped by water transport out of Toledo, Washington, on the Cowlitz River.

=== Transfer to the Columbia ===
On March 20, 1917, it was reported that Pomona had been chartered by the People's Transportation Company to operate out of The Dalles on the Columbia River as a temporary replacement for the Tahoma, which had recently struck a rock and sank. Salvage operations were then under way for the Tahoma.

As of November 29, 1917, a proposal had been made, but never acted upon, that Salem merchants should purchase the Pomona and the Oregona, to operate them as an independent steamboat line.

=== Night boat service ===
On January 4, 1918, O.C.T.C. announced that it would start a night steamboat service from Portland to Salem. This was based upon a request from Salem businessmen, who promised to support the new operation. The planned start was to be about January 15, 1918, depending on water conditions. The plan was to put Pomona on the route, leaving Portland at 8:00 p.m. for Salem, and departing the next morning from Salem at 8:30 a.m. on the return. Unlike the schedule up until then, which included calls numerous landings, there would be no stops along the way except at the locks. The night service by Pomona would be supplemented by the continuation of Grahamona on the route to Corvallis every other day from Portland.

== End of the Yellow Stack Line ==
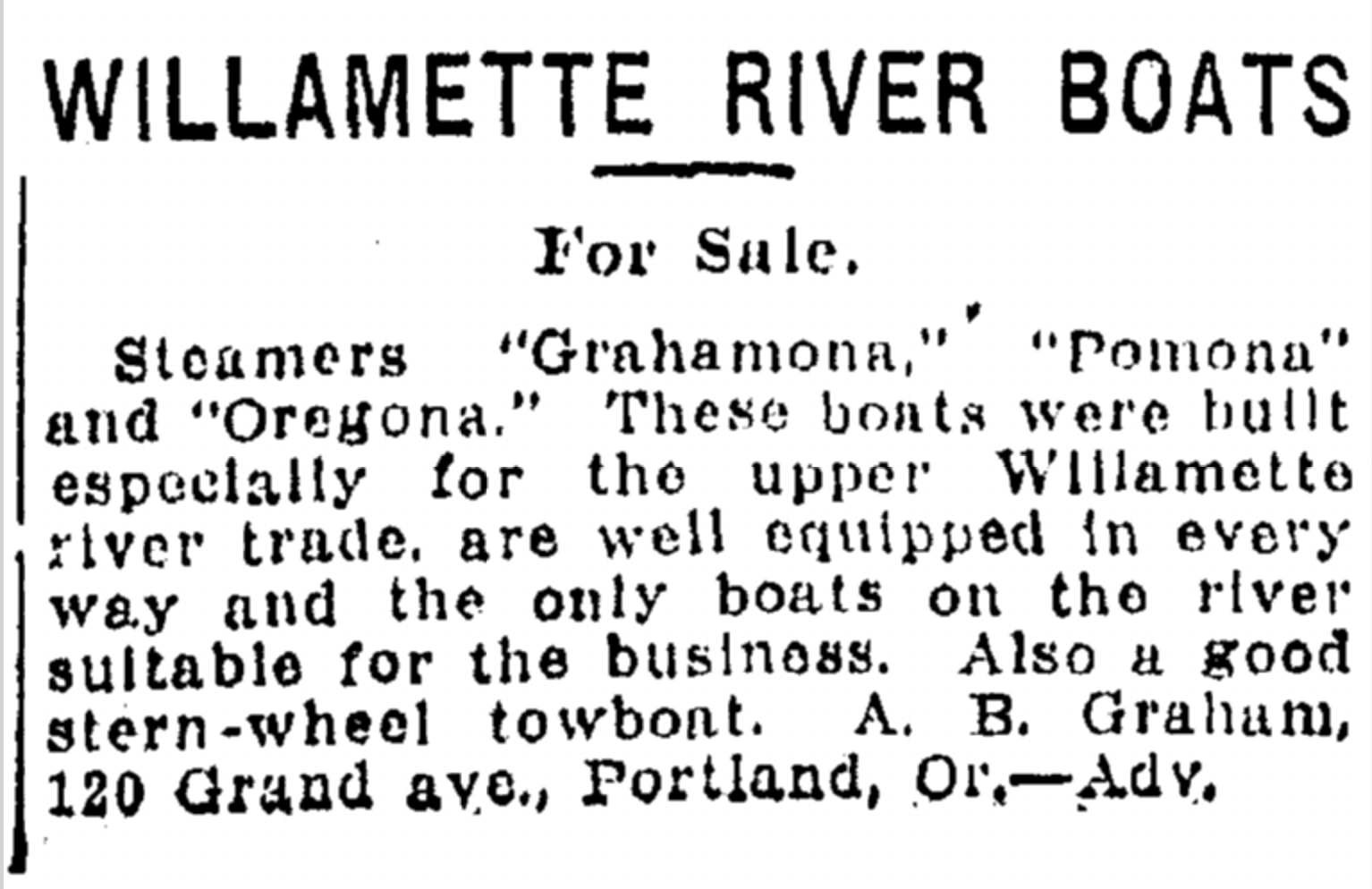
Advertisement for the sale of the O.C.T.C. boats, placed August 3, 1919 in the Oregonian newspaper.

On Thursday, May 2, 1918, it was announced that the Oregon City Transportation Company would cease operations. High costs and lack of business forced the business to close, which ended all steamboat service on the upper Willamette. The company was also unable to complete with haulage of freight overland by trucks on highways.

The company had been in business for 32 years. The final trip of the line was to be made by the Grahamona, departing Portland on Saturday, May 4, 1918, and returning from Corvallis the following Monday. Captain A.B. Graham would wrap up the company's affairs. After the shut-down, Pomona and Oregona were laid up, while Grahamona was refitted for work on the upper Columbia.

=== Lease to Capital Navigation Company ===
On March 13, 1919, it was reported that the recently formed Capital Navigation Company would take over operation of Pomona from the Willamette Navigation Company. The Capital Navigation Company had been formed by several steamboat men formerly employed by O.C.T.C. The new company chartered Pomona. The plan was to take the Pomona upriver to Independence every Tuesday, Thursday, and Saturday, with runs back down river every Monday, Wednesday, and Friday. The reported reason for the Willamette Navigation company giving up these runs was that they had too much other business to address.

W.E. Pratt, an experienced river businessman, was to be the agent for the new concern, which would use the Ash Street and the Busch docks in Portland as its headquarters. An earlier report was that the new concern had leased, rather than purchased, the Pomona, and intended to inaugurate service with Pomona on Tuesday, February 4, 1919. The new company intended to charge $3.50 per ton for freight transported from Portland to Salem, and $4.00 per ton for freight going to Independence. Captain Chris Bluhm would be in charge of Pomona. As it turned out, there was not enough business to sustain the new company, and Pomona was taken off the run.

=== Proposed sale to City of Salem ===
After the failure of the Capital Navigation Company, Captain A.B. Graham, of O.C.T.C. wrote, in July 1919, to the Salem Commercial Club, proposing that the city of Salem set up its own steamboat line by constructing a municipal dock and purchasing one or more of the company's steamers, Grahamona, Pomona, or Oregona.

A municipal dock had been proposed previously for Salem, but never acted upon by the city. Captain Graham's letter to the Commercial Club read in part:

You can no longer depend on the Oregon City Transportation company for it has gone out of business absolutely. Here is a chance to buy one, two, or three of its steamers, the Grahamona, Pomona, or Oregona. These boats were built especially for the Willamette river trade and the only boats in Portland built especially for shallow water. The whole plant can be had for less than the cost of building any single one at present prices of labor and material.

=== Sale to Inland Empire Boat & Truck Line ===
On February 17, 1920, it was reported that the three O.C.T.C. steamers, Pomona, Grahamona, and Oregona, had been sold to a newly formed concern, the Inland Empire Boat & Truck Line. The new line had been organized by M.E. Lee, who announced that the boats would be converted from wood to oil fuel, and they would begin operations by March 1, 1920. Captain Graham was also an organizer of the new company.

Pomona was to be placed on the Upper Willamette and Grahamona would go the upper Columbia. The plan for both vessels was to use auto trucks to gather freight shipments and bring them to points on the river where they would be loaded onto the river boats. Freight shipped by boat to the landings would also be distributed by truck.

This strategy was to be very successful on Puget Sound, but it did not work out on the Willamette River. Pomona ran for a while to Independence, but then it and the company's other boats were taken out of service on the Willamette.

== Service on the Cowlitz River ==
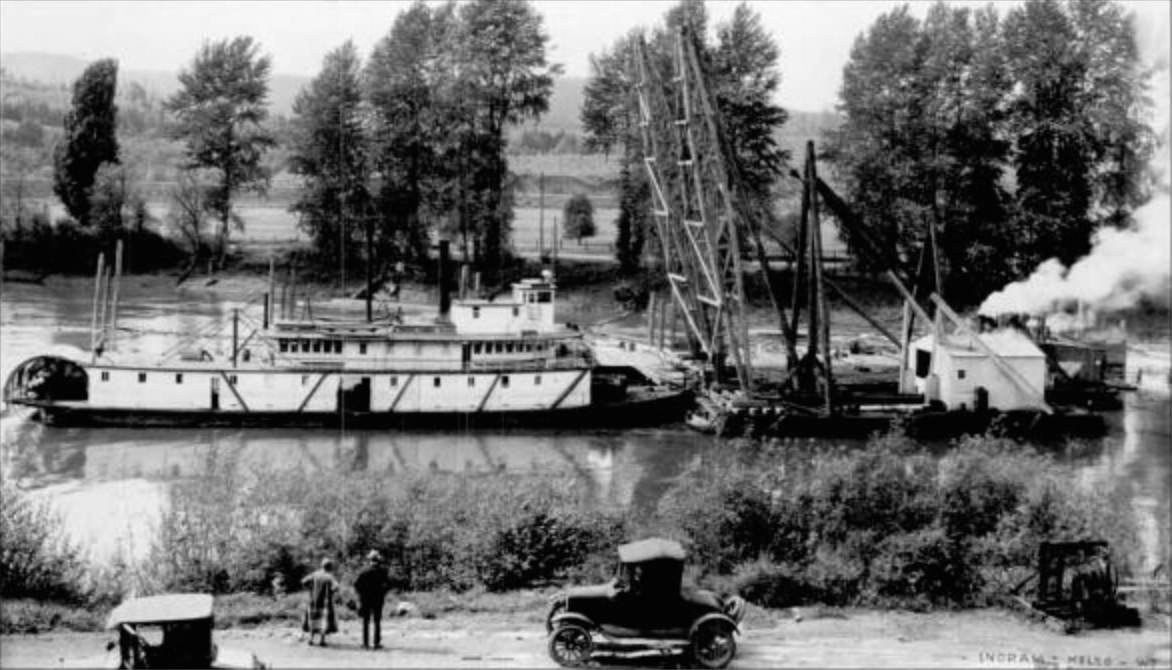
Pomona pushing a barge with bridge components on the Cowlitz River, 1925.

As of December 9, 1922, Pomona was owned by the Cowlitz Towing Company, which on that date purchased the towboat Wilavis from Captain Mattson of Portland. Stockholders of the Cowlitz Towing Company were then listed as E.S. Collins, J.A. Eyerly, Captain Hosford of Portland, and Frank Wagner, who was captain of Pomona and also local manager for the company.

=== Allen Street bridge disaster ===
When the Allen Street bridge collapsed at Kelso on January 3, 1923, the crew of Pomona, which was operating on the Cowlitz River at the time, trained the steamer's searchlight on the bridge to attempt to find the bodies of victims.

=== Assistance to Madeline ===
On Monday, March 23, 1925, the steamer Madeline, owned by the Harkins line, struck ground in shallow water at the mouth of the Cowlitz River. Although the damage was reported to have been "minor", the hull still filled with water. Madeline had been carrying an excursion consisting of members of the band of the Oregon Agricultural College. Pomona took off the band members and carried them to Rainier, Oregon.

=== Reconstructed ===
Pomona was reconstructed in 1926. The reconstructed boat was much smaller, rated at 216 gross tons and 120 net tons. The new boat was designed to pass under the draw of the Kelso bridge on the Cowlitz river. While the Kelso bridge was a lifting span, the rebuilt Pomona was intended to be able to pass under the bridge without having to raise it. The length was reduced from 134 feet to 120 feet.

The reconstruction work was done in Portland at the yard of the Portland Shipbuilding Company. The reconstruction gave Pomona the look of a completely different vessel. The pilot house, texas, and the name appeared to be among the main remaining features. To clear the Kelso bridge, the king post, hog posts and smokestack were all cut down. New engines and a new boiler were installed.

In November 1926, the rebuilt Pomona was owned by the Cowlitz Towing Company. Captain Frank Wagner was the manager and captain of the new Pomona. Another, non-contemporaneous source states that the owner after the rebuild was the Knappton Towboat Company of Astoria, Oregon.

== Last years ==
Pomona was still in operation in 1940, under the ownership of the Knappton Towing Company. The Knappton Towing Company allowed the vessel to be sent to Champoeg, Oregon, on Sunday, June 30, 1940, for the annual meeting of the Veteran Steamboatmen of the West. Traditionally the members of the association, which at that time was headed by Capt. Arthur Riggs, rode a steamboat to the annual meeting at Champoeg. However, at that time the water in the Oregon City locks was too shallow to allow any passenger-carrying steamboat to pass through, and only the Pomona could make the transit.

Later in 1940, the engines were removed from Pomona and the vessel was converted to a floating workshop. Pomona's machinery was scrapped at the time as other sternwheelers on the Columbia, Willamette and Coquille rivers, owing to the high value at the time of scrap metal and the very successful competition from diesel-powered, propeller driven vessels.

As of 1947, the unpowered Pomona was still in existence, on the Willamette River.

== See also ==
- Steamboats of the Willamette River
