= Minnie Mossman Hill =

American steamboat captain (1863–1946)

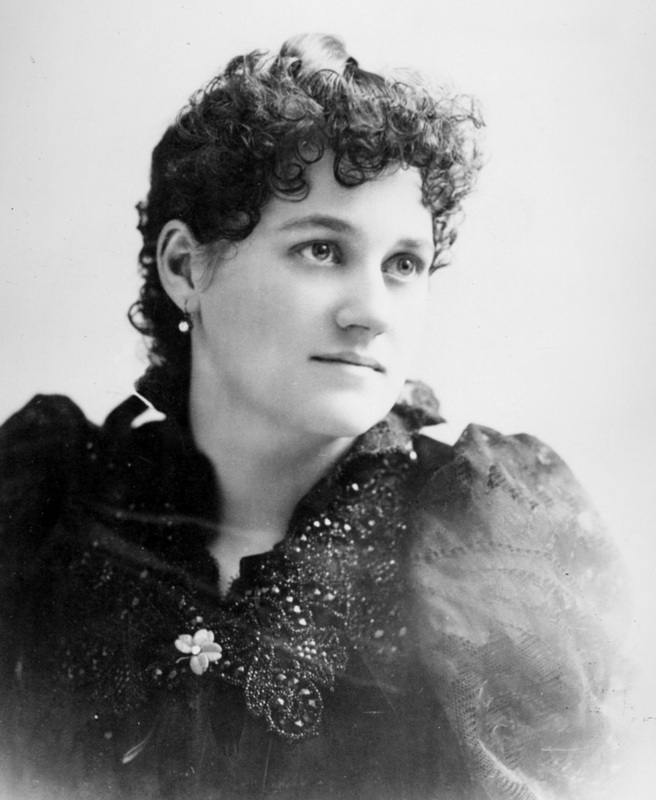
- Hill c. 1886
- Born: July 20, 1863; Albany, Oregon, U.S.
- Died: January 9, 1946 (aged 82); San Francisco, California, U.S.
- Occupation: Steamboat captain
- Known for: Being the first woman to hold a captain's license on the Columbia River
- Spouse: Charles Hill (m. 1883; died 1942)
- Children: 2

Minnie Mae Mossman Hill (July 20, 1863 – January 9, 1946) was an American steamboat captain. She was the first woman to hold a captain's license on the Columbia River. She commanded her own vessels and traded along the river during her career.

== Biography ==
Minnie Hill was born on July 20, 1863, in Albany, Oregon, where she spent her early life. Her father, Isaac Mossman, had been an agent of the Pony Express and her mother, Nellie, an early pioneer of Oregon. Minnie married Charles Hill, captain of the steamship Joseph Kellogg, in 1883. They lived together on the ship for three years, where Minnie Hill helped Charles with his work and the couple saved $1,000. While on the ship, she learned detailed skills relating to fixing and maintaining boats, navigation and piloting skills. With the saved money, they bought their own ship, a schooner.

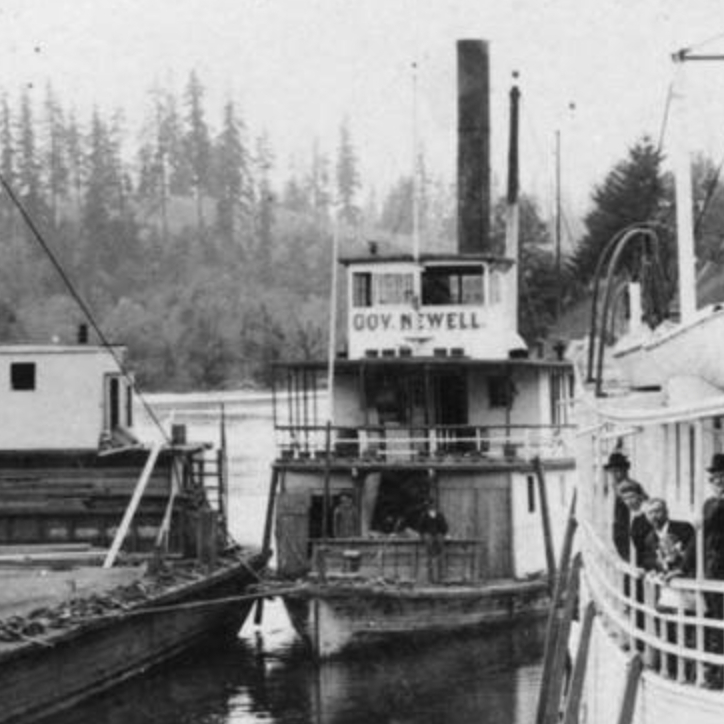
Hill's boat Governor Newell in 1900

Hill earned her master's and pilot's license on November 20, 1887. Her testing to earn her license was very difficult because "the examiners wanted to refuse her a license without justification". After earning her license, she became the new commander of the steamer Minnie Hill. She also became the first licensed woman to run a steamer on the Columbia River. Later, Hill and her husband bought the Clatsop Chief and the Governor Newell. She ran this ship as the captain for 14 years while Charles worked as the engineer and piloted up and down the Columbia River. She also was instrumental in doing business with the Chinookan people along the river. Hill was invited by the Chicago World's Fair to be the guest at the Women's Building exhibition in 1893, though she turned the invitation down.

During her time as a captain, she had two children, but only one lived. Her son, Herbert Wells Hill, was born in September 1894 and lived on boats until he was old enough to start school. Around the 1900s, she retired and went on to become a member of the Veteran Steamboatmen's Association. She also went on to "devote herself to raising her son".

Her husband died in Portland in 1942. Hill died in San Francisco on January 9, 1946, from a "heart ailment". She was inducted into the National Rivers Hall of Fame in 2017.
