= Leona (sternwheeler) =

Coordinates: 45.8723°N 122.7126°W

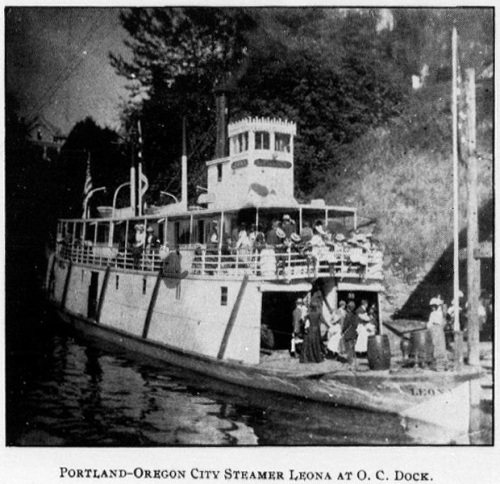
- Leona at Oregon City, Oregon, 1901 or earlier

History
- Name: Leona (ex McMinnville)
- Owner: Oregon City Transportation Company
- Route: Willamette River
- Builder: Joseph Supple
- Launched: 1899, at Portland, Oregon
- Identification: US #92959 (as McMinnville); #141710 (as Leona)
- Fate: Burned 1912, Willamette River
- Notes: Launched 1899 under McMinnville, rebuilt 1901 and renamed Leona

General characteristics
- Class & type: riverine steamboat, passenger/freighter
- Tonnage: 137 gross / 102 registered
- Length: 90 ft (27.43 m) (as McMinnville); 105 ft (32.00 m) (as Leona).
- Beam: 21 ft (6.40 m)
- Depth: 4 ft (1.22 m)
- Installed power: Twin single-cylinder horizontally mounted steam engines, 7" bore by 28" stroke, 3.3 NHP (as McMinnville); 7.5" bore by 30" stroke (as Leona).
- Propulsion: sternwheeler

The steamship Leona operated from 1899 to 1912 on the Willamette River in the U.S. state of Oregon. This vessel was original launched under the name McMinnville in 1899, and should not be confused with an earlier vessel named McMinnville, which ran on the Willamette River from 1877 to 1881.

== Construction ==
Leona / McMinville was built in 1899, at the shipyard of Joseph Supple at Portland, Oregon. The vessel was a sternwheeler driven by twin-single cylinder horizontally mounted steam engines.

== Acquisition by Yellow Stack Line ==
In 1901 the vessel was acquired by the Graham family, rebuilt and renamed Leona. The Graham steamboat line, formally called the Oregon City Transportation Company, but also known as the "Yellow Stack Line". All the steamers of the line had names that ended in -ona: Latona, Ramona, Altona, Leona, Pomona, Oregona, and Grahamona.

== Operations on Willamette River ==
Leona ran on the Willamette River, including south of Willamette Falls.

== Operations on the Lewis River ==
In the early part of the 1900s, transportation on the Lewis River, a tributary of the Columbia River downriver from Vancouver, Washington, was dominated by the Lewis River Transportation Company, in which a prominent businessman Jacob Kamm was interested. By 1904, Leona was brought on as an opposition boat, which generated at least one favorable comment in the press at the time:

The Kamm Co. (Lewis River Transportation Co.) service has been the poorest that ever ran on this river since the SWALLOW and HYDRA ran on it. If you know what side your bread is buttered on and have any sympathy for your neighbors, patronize the opposition boat LEONA at the foot of Oak Street Portland. If the people don't patronize it they ought to be compelled to walk to Ridgefield to the Railroad if they go at all.

== Loss by fire ==
In 1912, Leona burned on the Lewis river near what is now the modern town of La Center, Washington. The wreck of the Leona is still visible on the Lewis River at low water during July and August. The wreck site is reported to be on the west side of the Lewis River bridge at La Center, Washington.

== See also ==
- Steamboats of the Columbia River
