= Undine (Colorado River sternwheeler) =

Undine was a stern-wheel steamboat, built in Rock Island, Illinois and shipped to Green River, Utah, and launched in November 1901 by its owner and captain Frank H. Summerhill.

This vessel should not be confused with the Columbia River sternwheeler Undine.

== Specifications ==
Undine was a flat bottomed stern-wheel steamer, 60 feet in length, 10 feet on the beam, with a draft of 12 unladen to 20 inches carrying 15 tons of cargo. It had a coal-fired, 20 horsepower engine.

== Service on the river ==
Summerhill intended to serve a tourist trade from Green River to the Colorado cataracts as the prime source of his income. However he also intended to begin a shipping business up the Grand River, to Moab.

Summerhills first voyage down the Green River to the Colorado River cataracts was a success, and he spent some time there locating a site for his resort. The then steamed up the Grand, past the Green River all the way to Moab.

Summerhill realized that carrying cargo down the Grand and up the Green Rivers was longer and more difficult than attempting to steam 40 miles up the Grand River from Moab to a landing near the Denver and Rio Grande Western Railroad rail head of Cisco. He spent several mouths blasting rock hazards out of the Grand on the route, then attempted an ascent. The Undine had difficulty pulling itself up the first rapids with its cable and capstan. After several attempts resulting in snapped cables, it ascended the first rapid but at Big Bend, while ascending rapids with the cable, Undine's bow was caught in a current and it capsized, wrecking it on May 21, 1902.
