= La Center, Washington =

City in Clark County, Washington

La Center
- City
- Location of La Center, Washington
- Coordinates: 45°52′12″N 122°40′21″W
- Country: United States
- State: Washington
- County: Clark
- Founded: 1871
- Incorporated: August 27, 1909

Government
  - Type: Mayor-Council
  - Mayor: Thomas Strobehn

Area
  - Total: 2.623 sq mi (6.794 km^{2})
  - Land: 2.599 sq mi (6.731 km^{2})
  - Water: 0.024 sq mi (0.062 km^{2})
- Elevation: 52 ft (16 m)

Population (2020)
  - Total: 3,424
  - Estimate (2021): 3,795
  - Density: 1,313.8/sq mi (507.27/km^{2})
- Time zone: UTC-8 (PST)
  - Summer (DST): UTC-7 (PDT)
- ZIP Code: 98629
- Area code: 360, 564
- FIPS code: 53-36710
- GNIS feature ID: 2411566
- Website: ci.lacenter.wa.us

La Center is a city in Clark County, Washington, United States. The population was 3,424 at the 2020 census.

== History ==
In the 1870s, La Center was a business center and head of navigation on the East Fork of the Lewis River. In late summer, the regular schedules of the steamers Mascot and Walker, paddle-wheeling to Portland, were often interrupted by low water. Passengers and freight were transferred to scows, which were poled up the river or towed by horses along the bank. With the arrival of railroads and highways, La Center lost importance and lapsed into a small village serving the surrounding farming district. La Center was officially incorporated on August 27, 1909. Its population in 1940 was 193.

The city is home to three card rooms or casinos which allow gambling on card games and poker, but not slots. The three casinos are the New Phoenix, Last Frontier and Fortune.

== Geography ==
La Center has a total area of 1.28 square miles (3.32 km^{2}), of which, 1.27 square miles (3.29 km^{2}) is land and 0.01 square miles (0.03 km^{2}) is water.

== Demographics ==
Historical population
| Census | Pop. | Note | %± |
|---|---|---|---|
| 1910 | 288 | | — |
| 1920 | 167 | | −42.0% |
| 1930 | 219 | | 31.1% |
| 1940 | 193 | | −11.9% |
| 1950 | 204 | | 5.7% |
| 1960 | 244 | | 19.6% |
| 1970 | 300 | | 23.0% |
| 1980 | 439 | | 46.3% |
| 1990 | 451 | | 2.7% |
| 2000 | 1,654 | | 266.7% |
| 2010 | 2,800 | | 69.3% |
| 2020 | 3,424 | | 22.3% |
| 2021 (est.) | 3,795 | | 10.8% |
U.S. Decennial Census; 2020 Census

=== 2020 census ===
As of the 2020 census, La Center had a population of 3,424. The median age was 41.0 years. 24.5% of residents were under the age of 18 and 16.4% of residents were 65 years of age or older. For every 100 females there were 97.8 males, and for every 100 females age 18 and over there were 95.0 males age 18 and over.

0.0% of residents lived in urban areas, while 100.0% lived in rural areas.

There were 1,215 households in La Center, of which 40.2% had children under the age of 18 living in them. Of all households, 65.9% were married-couple households, 10.9% were households with a male householder and no spouse or partner present, and 15.4% were households with a female householder and no spouse or partner present. About 12.1% of all households were made up of individuals and 6.5% had someone living alone who was 65 years of age or older.

There were 1,248 housing units, of which 2.6% were vacant. The homeowner vacancy rate was 1.3% and the rental vacancy rate was 0.0%.

Racial composition as of the 2020 census
| Race | Number | Percent |
|---|---|---|
| White | 2,913 | 85.1% |
| Black or African American | 12 | 0.4% |
| American Indian and Alaska Native | 32 | 0.9% |
| Asian | 66 | 1.9% |
| Native Hawaiian and Other Pacific Islander | 5 | 0.1% |
| Some other race | 66 | 1.9% |
| Two or more races | 330 | 9.6% |
| Hispanic or Latino (of any race) | 226 | 6.6% |

=== 2010 census ===
As of the 2010 census, there were 2,800 people, 942 households, and 804 families residing in the city. The population density was 2,204.7 inhabitants per square mile (851.2/km^{2}). There were 981 housing units at an average density of 772.4 per square mile (298.2/km^{2}). The racial makeup of the city was 91.3% White, 1.0% African American, 0.8% Native American, 1.9% Asian, 1.5% from other races, and 3.4% from two or more races. Hispanic or Latino of any race were 4.6% of the population.

There were 942 households, of which 45.9% had children under the age of 18 living with them, 69.6% were married couples living together, 10.8% had a female householder with no husband present, 4.9% had a male householder with no wife present, and 14.6% were non-families. 11.3% of all households were made up of individuals, and 3.2% had someone living alone who was 65 years of age or older. The average household size was 2.97 and the average family size was 3.17.

The median age in the city was 36.6 years. 30.7% of residents were under the age of 18; 5.4% were between the ages of 18 and 24; 28.6% were from 25 to 44; 26.1% were from 45 to 64; and 9.4% were 65 years of age or older. The gender makeup of the city was 49.2% male and 50.8% female.

=== 2000 census ===
As of the 2000 census, the median income for a household in the city was $55,333, and the median income for a family was $57,375. Males had a median income of $45,893 versus $28,750 for females. The per capita income for the city was $21,224. About 3.6% of families and 4.7% of the population were below the poverty line, including 6.1% of those under age 18 and 4.3% of those age 65 or over.

== Arts and culture ==
=== Historic buildings and sites ===
La Center is home to the Highland Lutheran Church, built in 1887. Known as the Centennial Church, the building remains in its initial appearance, including an original mural. A kitchen addition was undertaken in 1900 and a structural remodel was completed in the 1980s. The church is considered as one of the oldest houses of worship in Washington state.

== Notable residents ==
- Richard Curtis, politician
- Eric Johnson Jr., professional auto racer
