= Oregona (sternwheeler) =

- Oregona at Salem, Oregon

History
- Name: Oregona (1904-1924); Interstate (1924-1936)
- Owner: Oregon City Transportation Co.; others later
- Route: Willamette, Columbia and Yamhill rivers.
- In service: 1904
- Out of service: 1936
- Identification: US registry #200949 (as Oregona); #223545 (as Interstate)
- Fate: Dismantled

General characteristics
- Tonnage: 370 gt; 281 rt (1904-1924); 336 gt; 308 rt (1924-1936)
- Length: 132 ft (40 m)
- Beam: 26.7 ft (8 m)
- Depth: 5 ft (2 m) depth of hold
- Installed power: twin horizontally mounted high-pressure single-cylinder steam engines.
- Propulsion: sternwheel

The steamboat Oregona operated on the Willamette River, the Columbia River and the Yamhill River from 1904 to 1936. From 1924 to 1936 this vessel was known as the Interstate.

== Design and construction ==
Oregona was built at Portland, Oregon 1904 for the Oregon City Transportation Company. The vessel's dimensions were 132 feet (40 m) long, with a 27-foot (8.2 m) beam, 5-foot (1.5 m) depth of hold, 370 gross tons and 281 registered tons. The vessel was propelled by a sternwheel which was turned by two twin horizontally mounted high pressure steam engines. The piston diameter on each engine was 9 inches (230 mm), with a bore stroke of 48 inches (1,200 mm), generating 5.4 nominal horsepower. The official steamboat registry number was 200949.

Oregona was a typical all-purpose working steamboat of the Willamette River.

== Operations ==
The Oregon City Transportation Company had been organized by the Graham family in 1889. It was popularly known as the Yellow Stack Line. The names of all of its steamboats ended in -ona, for example, Altona, Leona, and Ramona.

Until 1919, the Yellow Stack Line ran Oregona on the Willamette River as far south as Corvallis. In 1919, rising competition from trucks and automobiles operating on newly built highways forced the company to suspend operations. In 1920, Captain Graham organized a new company, Inland Empire Boat and Truck Co., with a plan for moving freight by steamboat to the boat landings along the Willamette river, then further distributing it overland by trucks based at the landings. This business plan did not work out, and the company was forced to move Oregona off the Willamette as its regular route.

In 1924 Oregona was reconstructed at Vancouver, Washington and renamed Interstate. The overall length and beam of the vessel were unchanged, but it was slightly smaller but had a greater carrying capacity, at 336 gross tons and 308 registered tons. The engines at this time were rated at 350 indicated horsepower. The reconstructed vessel was operated by Greyhound Transportation Company. The official steamboat number for Interstate was 223545.

As Interstate, the vessel was run on routes down the Columbia to Longview and Kelso, Washington, although on occasion a run was made up the Yamhill River to Dayton, Oregon.

== 1907 lining accident ==
Ruth (left) and Oregona (right) at Champoeg, Oregon, sometime between 1904 and 1920.

To move through rapids, steamboats used a practice called lining, which involved running a rope or a steel cable to a secure point on shore, typically a large tree or a bolt specially set in a rock, and then wrapping the cable around a steam-powered winch on the boat. The winch would then crank in the cable, if the vessel was going upstream, or gradually let out the cable, if the vessel was headed downstream. Along the Willamette River, in the first decades of the 1900s, the most dangerous obstacles to navigation were Willamette Falls and the Clackamas Rapids. Since 1873 locks at Oregon allowed navigation around Willamette Falls, but as late as 1907, lining was still required to pass the Clackamas Rapids, which were located north of Oregon City, near the mouth of the Clackamas River.

Lining was dangerous, as it was only the single cable that prevented the vessel from being washed downstream and likely wrecked. Any use of a cable on board a vessel was also hazardous to the crew. On October 15, 1907, at 8:30 am, while Oregona was lining through Clackamas Rapids, the lining cable became tangled in the sternwheel of a nearby steamer, the Ruth. A deckhand on Oregona, Virgil K. Pollard, was caught in a loop of the cable, which tightened around his legs, severing both legs six inches (152 mm) above the ankles. The injured deckhand brought a legal action against the Ruth. When the case was presented to U.S. District Court Judge Robert S. Bean, he ruled that accident was held to be the fault of the Ruth, for ignoring the warning signals of the Oregona to stand away while the deckhand was engaged in coiling the cable which was still paid out from the Oregona following an unsuccessful lining attempt. Judge Bean awarded the deckhand, who was 19 years of age at the time of the accident, $12,000 in damages.

== 1909 and 1913 sinkings ==
On December 10, 1909, Oregona hit a snag in the Willamette river, and was forced to beach three miles (5 km) upriver from Weston Landing.

On December 26, 1913 Oregona was making the vessel's last run of the season, coming downriver from Corvallis loaded with cargo and carrying passengers. With Captain Bluhm in command, Oregona encountered the U.S. Corps of Engineers dredge Champoeg at Magoon Bar at the foot of the Clackamas Rapids. The dredge was in an unexpected location anchored in the middle of the channel. While the officers of Oregona attempted to avoid the dredge, this proved not possible, and the Oregona struck the corner of the dredge, suffering severe enough damage to cause the Oregona to sink after drifting down the river below the rapids.

== Disposition ==
Oregona was abandoned in 1936.

== Images ==
- Oregona at Salem, detailed image (USC digital collections).
