= Harvest Queen (sternwheeler) =

American steamboat

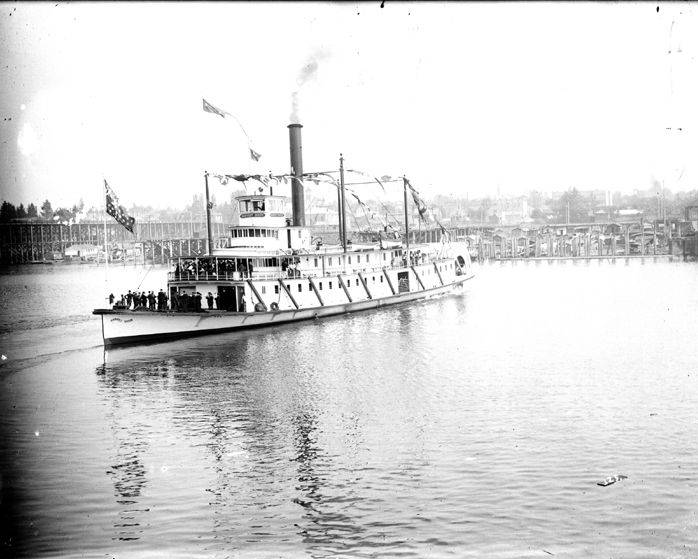
- The second Harvest Queen backing away from a landing, ca 1910, probably at Portland, Oregon, on the Willamette River.

History
- Name: Harvest Queen
- Owner: Oregon Steam Navigation Co.; later, Oregon Railway & Navig. Co.
- Route: Columbia River and lower Willamette River to Portland, Oregon
- Builder: (for 1900 rebuild): Peter Carstens (1842-1914)
- Cost: $24,000
- Completed: 1878, Celilo, Oregon
- Fate: Dismantled 1900; reconstructed; stripped and abandoned, 1926

General characteristics
- Class & type: riverine passenger/freight
- Length: As built 200 ft (61.0 m) over hull (exclusive of fantail); As rebuilt 187 ft 9 in (57.23 m) measured over guards
- Beam: 39 ft 9 in (12.1 m) hull; 46 ft 9 in (14.25 m) over guards
- Depth: 8 ft 0 in (2.44 m)
- Decks: three (main, boiler, and hurricane)
- Installed power: twin steam engines, horizontally mounted, each with bore of 20 in (508.0 mm) and stroke of 8 ft (2.44 m); wood-fired boiler
- Propulsion: stern-wheel
- Speed: 20 miles (32 km) per hour (downstream).

Harvest Queen was the name of two stern-wheel steamboat built and operated in Oregon. Both vessels were well known in their day and had reputations for speed, power, and efficiency.The first Harvest Queen, widely considered one of the finest steamers of its day, was constructed at Celilo, Oregon, which was then separated from the other portions of the navigable Columbia River by two stretches of difficult to pass rapids.

At considerable risk, this steamer was taken down through the first set of rapids in 1881, and the second set in 1890. Thereafter the first Harvest Queen was worked primarily between Astoria and Portland, Oregon until 1900, when it was dismantled. Most of the machinery was installed in a new, slightly smaller vessel, also called the Harvest Queen, which, although it had accommodations for passengers, was primarily worked as a towboat.

In 1926, the second Harvest Queen was sold to Alaska Junk Company, a scrap metal recycler, which sought a buyer for the steamer. With no buyer found, the boat was stripped out and then abandoned near Ross Island.

== Construction ==
Harvest Queen was built in 1878 at Celilo, Oregon for the Oregon Steam Navigation Company. The name was suggested by one T.B. Merry, "because she was the queen of the harvest, and the farmers' salvation." This vessel was sometimes referred to as the Queen. On August 1, 1878, it was reported that the Harvest Queen was undergoing finishing work at Celilo, and was expected to be ready to begin running between Celilo and Wallula, Washington by the first of September. Harvest Queen cost $24,000 to build.

== Dimensions and engineering ==
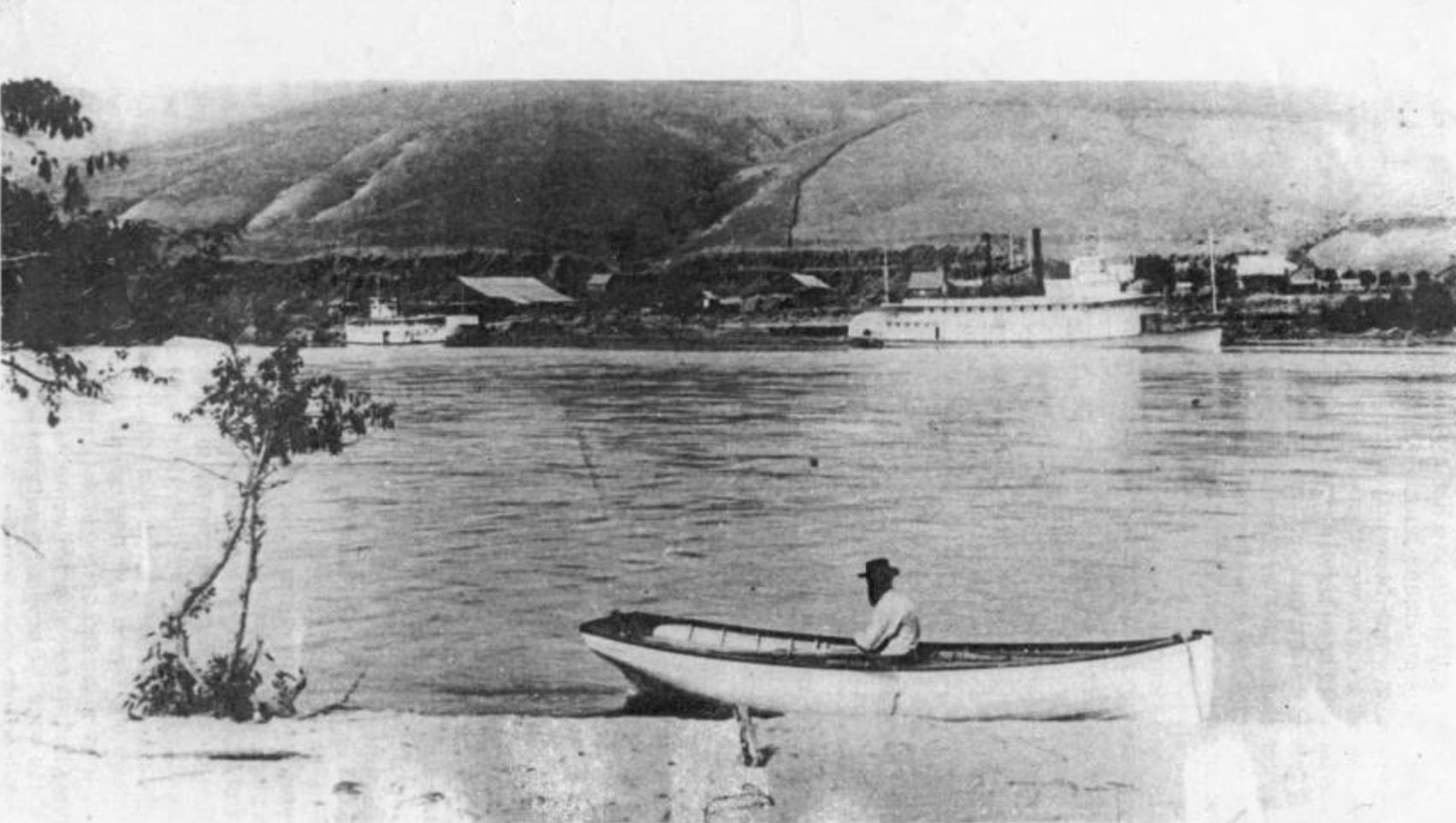
Harvest Queen, on right, at Almota, W.T. on the Snake River. Steamer Almota is on left. Photograph taken by Capt. James W. Troup.

As built, Harvest Queen was 200 ft (60.96 m) feet long, exclusive of the fantail, which was the overhang at the stern of the boat on which the sternwheel was mounted. Harvest Queen had a beam (width) of 37 ft (11.28 m) feet, which was exclusive of the guards, the wide wooden protective timbers running along the top of the hull. Counting the fantail and the guards, Harvest Queen was 226 ft (68.88 m) feet long, with a beam of 42 ft (12.80 m) feet. The depth of hold was 7.5 ft (2.29 m) feet. Depending on the load, the steamer's draft ranged from 3.5 ft (1.07 m) to 6 ft (1.83 m) feet. The vessel could carry nearly 500 tons of cargo. Overall size of the vessel was 845.80 gross and 697.04 registered tons. The official merchant vessel registry number was 95534.

Harvest Queen was driven by twin horizontally mounted single-cylinder steam engines, each turning an arm, called a pitman, connected to the stern-wheel. Each engine had a bore of 20 in (50.8 cm) and a piston stroke of 8 ft (2.44 m).

== Operations 1878-1900 ==
In June, 1879, I was captain and pilot of the steamer Harvest Queen, a stern-wheel steamboat 200 feet long, 38-foot beam, 20-inch cylinders and 10-foot stroke. We would be loaded and ready to take passengers that had left Portland the same morning, and leave Celilo Friday evenings at 6 o'clock with 425 tons of merchandise, distribute the freight and passengers at their different destinations as far as Lewiston on Snake River; returning take on board 450 tons of grain at the different shipping points along the river and arrive at Celilo at 6 P..M. Monday, traveling 550 miles and handling 875 tons in 72 hours of night and day running.
William P. Gray, 1909.

In 1878, the navigable portion of the Columbia river was divided into the "lower river", running from the river mouth, near Astoria, to the Cascades Rapids. This was also called the Cascades route. The stretch between the head of the Cascades rapids and the foot of Celilo Falls was called the "middle river", the "middle Columbia" or the "Dalles route". The Columbia above Celilo Falls was called the "upper river" or the "upper Columbia".

Harvest Queen was built to work on the upper river, in conjunction with steamers working on the middle and the lower rivers. The Queen was then the largest steamer operating on the upper river. James W. Troup was the first captain of the vessel.

Navigation on the upper Columbia was seasonal in nature, usually beginning about the middle of March and ending at the beginning of December. Dense fogs and low water in early December 1879 forced the withdrawal of the larger upper river steamers, Harvest Queen, D.S. Baker, and Annie Faxon, from service and even the smaller vessels were having difficulty navigating on the river.

In 1879, the extremely successful Oregon Steam Navigation company was dissolved, and all its steamers, including Harvest Queen, fell under the ownership of a new corporation, the Oregon Railway and Navigation Company.

In April 1879, the Snake River was rising rapidly, at the rate of two feet a day. Because of the increased water depth, and the increased freight on the Snake River, the decision was made to take Harvest Queen up the Snake River to Lewiston, Idaho. Upon reaching Lewiston, Harvest Queen would be the largest steamer, by 35 feet, ever to reach that city.

William P. Gray (b.1845) was captain of the Harvest Queen in June 1879.

On Monday, August 25, 1879, Harvest Queen arrived at Celilo with 437 tons of wheat, which at that time was the largest load ever carried on the upper Columbia.

In early October 1880, President Rutherford B. Hayes was touring the west. After visiting Walla Walla, President Hayes and his party rode a train west to the Columbia river, where they boarded the . At Wallula, the president boarded the Harvest Queen, which proceeded west downriver to Celilo.

Rail construction was advancing along the south bank of the upper Columbia eastward from The Dalles, towards Wallula, W.T., at the confluence of the Columbia and Walla Walla rivers. By December 1880, the rail line had reached Blalock Landing, thirty miles upriver from Celilo. Harvest Queen ran between Wallula and Blalock Landing.

In December 1880, a moored steamboat, the Northwest was in use as the railroad waiting room at Blalock Station. Once the rail line reached Wallula, there would be little work remaining for Harvest Queen on the upper river.

=== Transfer to middle Columbia ===
In 1881, Harvest Queen was transferred to the middle Columbia River. This required the steamer to be run through Celilo Falls. Under the command of James W. Troup, one of the best-regarded steamboat captains of the day, on February 8, 1881, Harvest Queen went through the first stretch of whitewater, called Tumwater Rapids, sustaining serious damage in the process.

The boat was beached and temporary repairs were made, and the boat was returned to the river. At least two more falls lay between the steamer and The Dalles These were Five Mile and Ten Mile Rapids. Harvest Queen was able to pass both these rapids with only minor damage. The steamer reached The Dalles, the principal city on the middle Columbia, on February 18, 1881.

From 1881 to 1890, Harvest Queen was operated on the middle river, under the command of Capt. John McNulty.

=== Transfer to lower Columbia ===
On Sunday, May 18, 1890, under command of Captain Troup, Harvest Queen was run through the Cascades to the lower river, witnessed by the largest crowd ever assembled for such an event.

Four hundred people came down from The Dalles on the steamer D.S. Baker. One thousand people boarded the R.R. Thompson at Portland, with eight hundred more embarking on the T.J. Potter. Bands aboard the steamers entertained the passengers. Ione also transported excursionists.

In addition, three passenger trains departed the Union Pacific depot in Portland, bound for the Cascades. About 8,000 tickets were sold for passage on the trains. Another train came in from Arlington, Oregon.

Once all the passengers had arrived on the steamers, they were transported from the lower Cascades five miles on the narrow gauge portage railway, or, in the case of the R.R. Thompson's passengers, on the regular line, to the upper Cascades, where the rapids began.

The first four miles of the Cascades were covered in just four minutes. There were twenty passengers on board during the run, including prominent steamboat personnel of the day. This was the fourth time that Captain Troup had brought a steamer down through the rapids. It was the ninth time that a steamer had been brought through the Cascades rapids. No further runs through the Cascades would be made until three years later, in 1893, when Captain Baughman took D.S. Baker from the middle to the lower river.

By this time, the Union Pacific railroad had acquired control of the Oregon Railway and Navigation Company. On April 1, 1890, the Union Pacific reorganized its riverine service, and appointed Captain Troup as superintendent. Harvest Queen was extensively repaired in 1890.

In March 1892 there were rumors of an impending rate war on the Portland-Astoria run among the Union Pacific, owners of the Harvest Queen, the then-new and speedy steamer T.J. Potter, and the pioneer steamboat men Jacob Kamm, owner of Lurline, and U.B. Scott, owner of the very fast stern-wheeler Telephone.

=== Readiness against Coxey's Army ===
In April 1894, Harvest Queen embarked 300 troops from the barracks of Vancouver Barracks to be transported to Kalama in case of trouble caused by "Commonwealers" at Puyallup, Washington. A Northern Pacific special train was waiting at Kalama to transport the troops to Puyallup. The Commonwealers were a branch of Coxey's Army, an organization of laborers that arose in the context of the widespread unemployment following the Panic of 1893. The general plan of the Commonwealers, and similar groups around the country, was to travel to Washington, D.C. to protest, seeking government funding of projects that would produce jobs for the unemployed. Trouble had come in various cities as the Commonwealers boarded trains without paying fares. A large rally of the Commonwealers took place in Puyallup, Washington near the end of April, 1894. No transport of troops from Vancouver Barracks was ordered however, and at 4:00 p.m. on May 2, 1894, Harvest Queen was discharged from War Department service, and returned to Portland.

=== Rescue of snow-bound train passengers ===
In early January, 1895, an O.R.& N. passenger train became stranded by snow drifts in the Columbia Gorge. On the morning of January 5, 1895, Harvest Queen was dispatched to proceed upriver through floating ice and bring out the passengers.

=== Intervention in fishermen's strike ===
In 1896, Harvest Queen was chartered by the Oregon National Guard to transport troops to Astoria to intervene in a fishermen's strike. On Tuesday, June 15, 1896, an officer of the Oregon adjutant-general's office, Major Geo. T. Willett placed a telephone call to Col. Owen Summers, at the Multnomah County Armory. Willett informed Summers that an order would soon be issued to require Summers to assemble his troops and be ready for instant movement. Later orders to Summers were that Harvest Queen had been chartered by the Oregon Military Department and that he should embark the troops under his command onto the steamer to proceed to Astoria, and to cooperate there with county judge J.H.D. Gray in suppression of the fishermen's strike then in progress.

The troops were assembled by 11:30 p.m. on June 15, and were ready to embark on Harvest Queen early the next morning, at 2:30 a.m. The troops marched in a column to the dock where the Harvest Queen lay, and boarded the vessel. Freight and equipment, including Gatling guns and field artillery, was also loaded on board, and at 4:00 a.m. on June 16, Harvest Queen pulled out from the dock.

Col. Summers ordered the troops to behave in a military fashion and to remain inside the cabin of the vessel so that there would not be a visible military presence on the decks of the steamer. Sentries were posted to insure this remained so.

Harvest Queen with the troops on board arrived at the O.R.& N.'s dock in Astoria at 10:30 a.m. on June 16, 1896. An encampment was set up in the courthouse square. Troops were detailed to serve as cannery guards, and a Gatling gun was set up on a tugboat to serve as a harbor patrol vessel. No disturbance was noted. On June 21, 1896, Colonel Summers was ordered to return to Portland with his command, but leave behind in Astoria about 100 troops, with the Gatling guns. The troops returned to Portland on board Harvest Queen.

=== Opening of Cascades Locks and Dam ===
Four steamers at the opening of Cascade Locks. From left to right: Maria, Dalles City, Harvest Queen, and Sarah Dixon

Harvest Queen was present at the formal opening of the Cascade Locks and Canal on the afternoon of November 5, 1896.

== Sinkings and other incidents ==
=== Overcrowding ===
Time and again they have exceeded the limit of their licenses without being called to account by either citizen or officer, but very recently two or three Astorians noted for their curiosity as well as enterprise, concluded to count the willing passengers without the knowledge or consent of anyone but themselves, and they found the difference so great between the number each boat is allowed to carry and the actual number carried on these excursions that one of these bold Astorians actually preferred charges against these famous boats that have taken the law in their own hands so long, and in doing their duty these honest inspectors will see to it that the law shall be vindicated and the offending boats libeled immediately.
The Daily Morning Astorian
June 13, 1890

In June 1890, Warren V. Sackett, captain of the Yaquina Bay steamer Walluski, filed a complaint with the U.S. steamboat inspection office in Portland, alleging that Harvest Queen, and another steamer, S.G. Reed had carried passengers in excess of licensed capacity.

Against Harvest Queen, Sackett charged that the steamer departed Portland for Astoria on June 8, carrying 613 passengers, when the boat's license allowed for only 400. Against S.G. Reed, Sackett claimed that the steamer had run from Portland to Oregon City, also on June 8, carrying 561 passengers, and returned with 760, when the Reed's license allowed only 500. The practice of carrying passengers in excess of the licensed limit was criticized in the Daily Morning Astorian.

In addition to fines of $1,000 against the ship owners for each offense, Sackett and any other person filing such allegations stood to earn one-half of the fine imposed by the government, as well as $10 per head and passage money for every passenger carried in excess of the license limit.

A fine was imposed. The O.R.&N. applied to the federal district court in Portland, Oregon, to remit the fine. In March, U.S. District Judge Matthew Deady made his findings, which were to have been forwarded to the secretary of the treasury. The case against S.G. Reed was dismissed.

=== Groundings and sinking ===
At 3:00 in the morning of Saturday, January 23, 1892, Harvest Queen ran aground at Warrior Reef, on the Columbia River near St. Helens. The grounding occurred near Warrior Rock lighthouse on Sauvie Island. The fog was so thick that the light could not be seen. At about 6:00 a.m. the small propeller steamer City of Astoria came along, and Harvest Queen signaled to the passing boat. Thirty-five passengers, and, reportedly, the steamer's freight, were transferred to the City of Astoria and brought to Portland. Sometime later, either about noon or 8:00 p.m. the steamer was refloated, sustaining no harm except for some minor damage to the stern-wheel.

In June 1894, the Union Pacific tried to send the Harvest Queen back up through the Cascades rapids to work again on the Middle Columbia. The attempt was near success, but near the top of the rapids, Harvest Queen struck a rock, and began to fill with water.

On November 19, 1895, after departing Astoria bound for Portland, Oregon, she ran into a submerged piling at a fish trap near Oak Point, 60 miles downriver from Portland in heavy fog. The steamer sank and was thought to be a total loss. Later however the vessel was raised and taken to Portland, Oregon for repairs, operated until 1899, when it was deconstructed with much of its machinery going to a new steamer of the same name.

=== Excessive speed ===
In 1895 the city of Portland had an ordinance which restricted the speed of steamboats to 6 miles per hour in front of the city. The ordinance was widely ignored, but eventually the harbormaster McInnis decide to enforce it. He caused Captain Gray, of the Lurline, and Captain Martineau, of Harvest Queen, to be arrested and charged with violating the speed ordinance as a test case.

=== Drownings ===
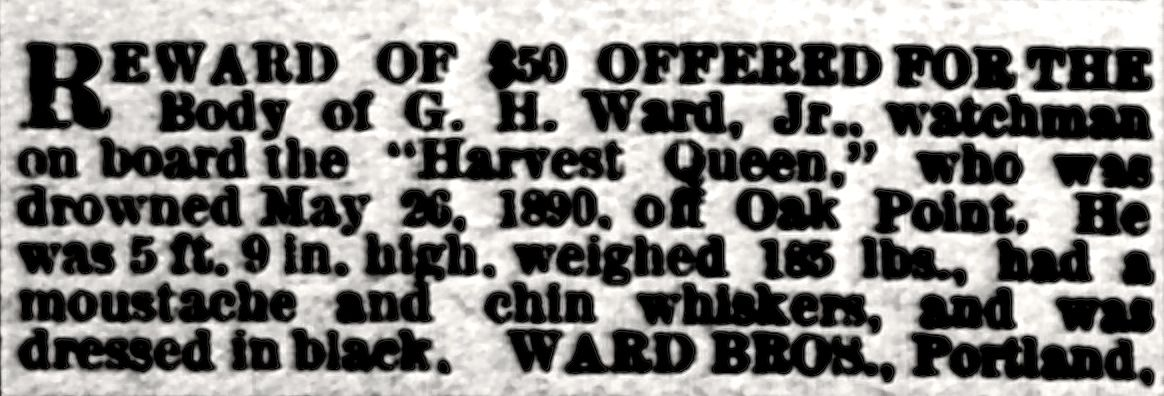
Reward placed June 18, 1890, for recovery of the body of crewman George P. Ward, drowned crewman of Harvest Queen.

Crewmen on board steamboats in the 1890s did not wear life-preservers. Drownings often occurred if they fell into the river. In late May, 1890, while Harvest Queen was coming upriver from Astoria to Portland, George P. Ward, of Portland, a watchman, was drowned when he was struck with a gang plank as the boat was preparing for a landing and knocked into the river.

According to a later, more detailed account, at about midnight, Ward, who had recently acquired a mate's license, slipped on the deck while preparing to receive a load of several cords of wood from a landing as fuel for the steamer, which was then moving at full speed. Ward fell, struck his head on the guard and rolled off the boat, possibly in a state of unconsciousness. Captain Emken, in command at the time, was immediately notified, and the steamer was stopped and a boat sent out to look for Ward. The steamer and the boat cruised around for two hours looking for him, proceeding two miles downriver, but they found nothing.

Efforts to recover Ward's body were unsuccessful. The Queen arrived in Portland with the flag at half-staff on account of the death. Ward's brothers, of Portland, offered a $50 reward for recovery of his body.

On the night of Wednesday, February 17, 1897, another crewman, Archibald A. Roof fell off Harvest Queen, and was presumed drowned. The steamer was towing the barkentine Northwest, and nearing the confluence of the Willamette and the Columbia rivers when Roof was last seen. Shortly after that, Roof was missed, and it was supposed he had fallen off the boat and was drowned. There were no witnesses however.

== The rebuilt Harvest Queen ==
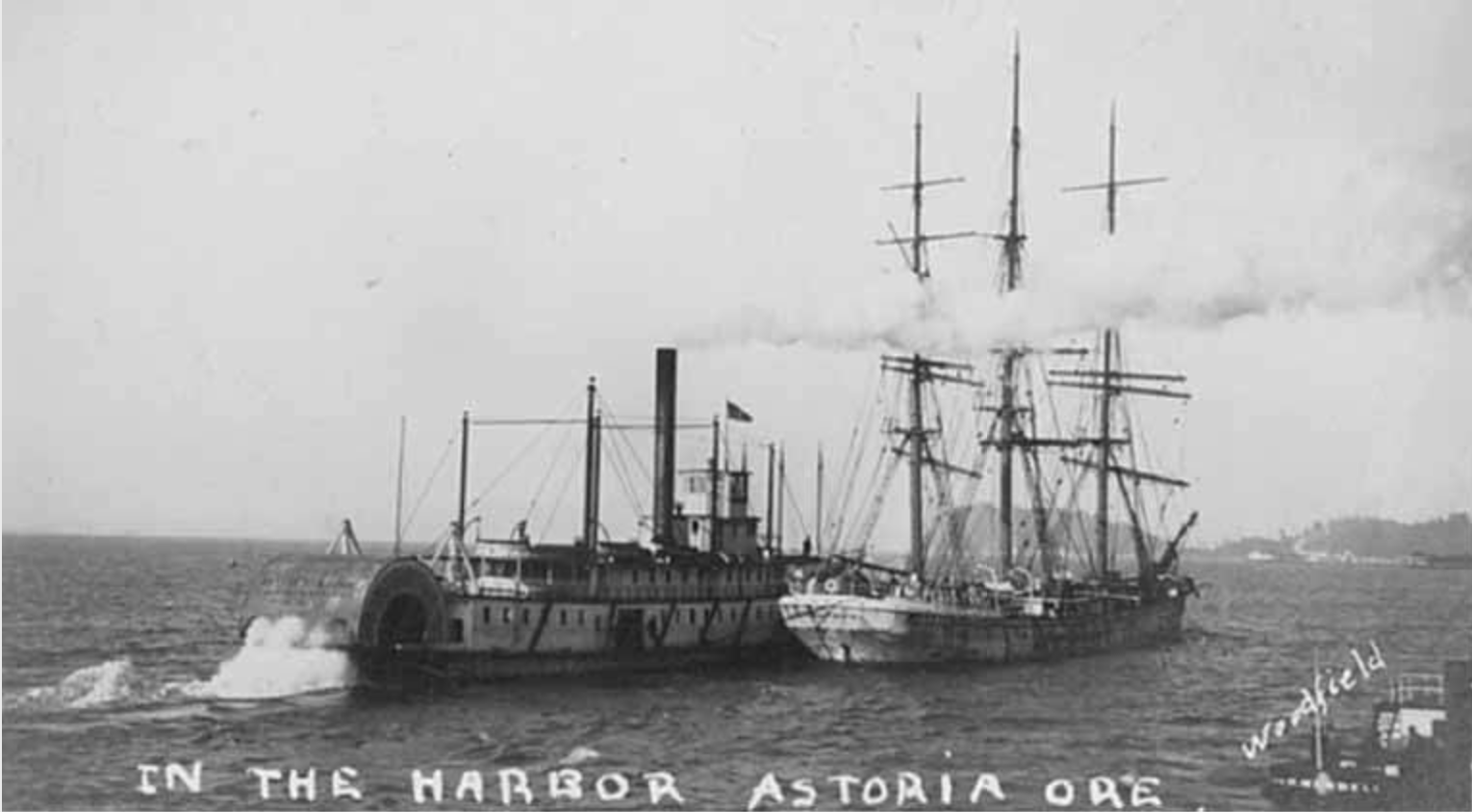
The second Harvest Queen at Astoria, Oregon, circa 1906, towing an ocean-going ship.

In 1900, by a Danish immigrant shipbuilder, Peter Carstens (1842–1914), built a new vessel, also called Harvest Queen, at Portland for the Oregon Railway & Navigation Company. Much of the machinery and many of the fittings from the old vessel were used on the new steamer. The steam engines were of the poppet valve type, with 24 inch cylinders and an 8-foot piston stroke.

The upper works seem to have been transferred to the new steamer also, which was reported to have more staterooms than usually found on towboats.

The rebuilt vessel was 187.0 feet long, exclusive of the fantail, with a beam of 39.8 feet, exclusive of the guards. The depth of hold was 9.0 feet. Overall size was 733 gross and 430 registered tons. The official merchant registry number was 96489. Total number of crew required was listed as 12. The machinery was built in Portland by the firm of Wolff & Zwicker.

== Operations after 1900 ==
The second Harvest Queen was launched at 11:00 a.m. on May 1, 1900, at the company's shipyard in North Portland.

Harvest Queen was taken out on a trial trip on the Willamette River on the afternoon of Thursday, August 2, 1900. The boilers were set to produce only 120 pounds of steam, rather than the 180 pounds to be carried in service. The stern-wheel was also revolved more slowly, at 21 revolutions per minute rather than the 30 turns a minute when the boat was under full speed. Still the boat made a six-mile run downstream to St. Johns in 19 minutes.

The rebuilt steamer was scheduled to make its first passenger trip on Sunday, August 5, 1900, carrying the Oregon Camera Club, departing from the Ash Street dock at 8:30 a.m. The commander of Harvest Queen would be Capt. Lester A. Bailey, and the chief engineer would be Fred Smith.

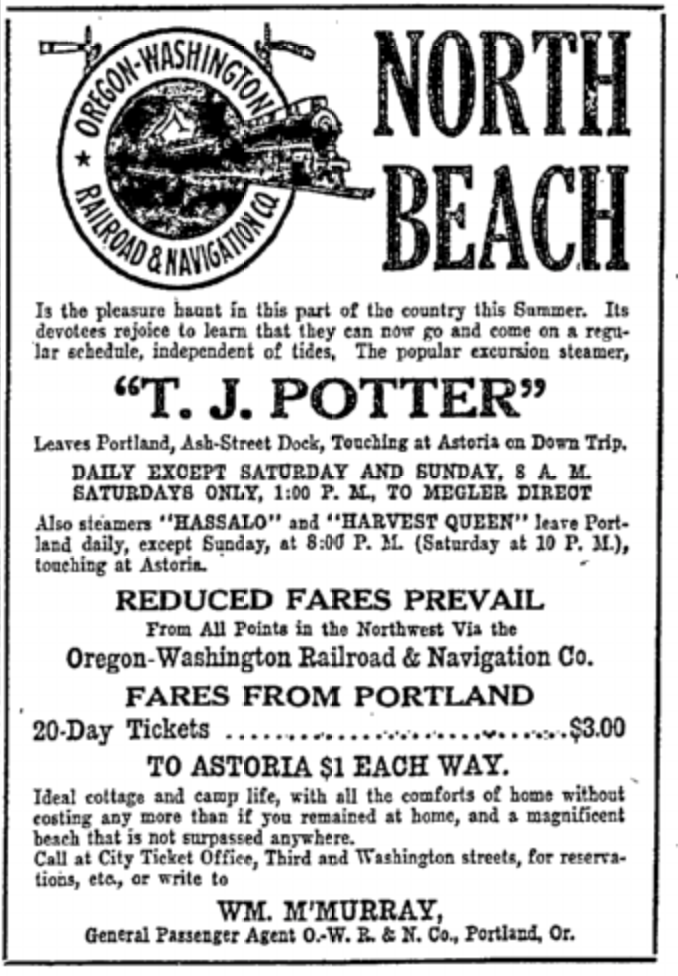
Advertisement for the O-W R.&N. steamer service to the North Beach vacation area in Pacific County, WA.

In October 1910, it was reported that Harvest Queen would undergo some reconstruction work, with new staterooms being added. Work on the top level of cabins, called the Texas, would also be done. There was little towing work for Harvest Queen any more, as the Union Pacific had turned over that business to the Port of Portland.

In August 1911, Harvest Queen was running together with T.J. Potter and Hassalo from Portland to Megler, Washington. Harvest Queen departed the Ash street dock in Portland at 8:00 p.m. every weekday (10:00 p.m. on Saturdays) for the beach, stopping at Astoria on the trip downriver. There was no service on Sundays.

On September 5, 1912, the Howell Shingle Mill, the largest business in Cathlamet, Washington, caught fire in the drying kilns at about 3:30 p.m. The steamers Julia B. and Monarch were on the scene and ran firehoses out to fight the fire. Later the Harvest Queen arrived, and all the boats remained until 2:00 a.m., when the fire was brought under control. Although the mill itself was saved, the dry kiln and 13 carloads of shingles were destroyed, for a total loss of about $20,000. For some time, in addition to the mill, the Skamokawa dock, store, note and several nearby residences were also in danger.

In February 1913, Harvest Queen was taken out of service for an overhaul and some reconstruction work. The steamer had run over 178,000 miles since its last major overhaul. A new and lower smokestack, as well as lower king posts and hog posts were installed, so that the steamer could pass under a newly build railroad bridge with the water at the 20-foot stage. The top of the stack would now be 57 feet above the water level. The work was done at the Port of Portland dry dock.

In March 1914, plans were announced to install wireless radio communication on Harvest Queen, which would be the first steamer on the river to be fitted with radio apparatus.

On February 18, 1921, Harvest Queen departed Portland at 8:00 P.M. for Astoria for the last time. When Harvest Queen departed Astoria the next day, returning to Portland, all steamboat service of the O-W R & N on the Portland-Astoria route ended permanently. The Harkins line would handle the O.W. R & N's business on the Astoria run.

In June, 1921 it was announced that Harvest Queen would be employed as a ferry running across the Columbia between Astoria and Megler, meeting a Harkins steamer, the propeller Georgiana. With the summer rush over, in September 1921, Harvest Queen was withdrawn from the Astoria-Megler ferry service, and taken to Portland, where it was tied up to a dock next to Hassalo and T.J. Potter.

Harvest Queen was also operated as a ferry on the Astoria-Megler route during the summer of 1923 as a replacement for the propeller-driven steamboat Nahcotta, which was then undergoing repair.

== Disposition ==
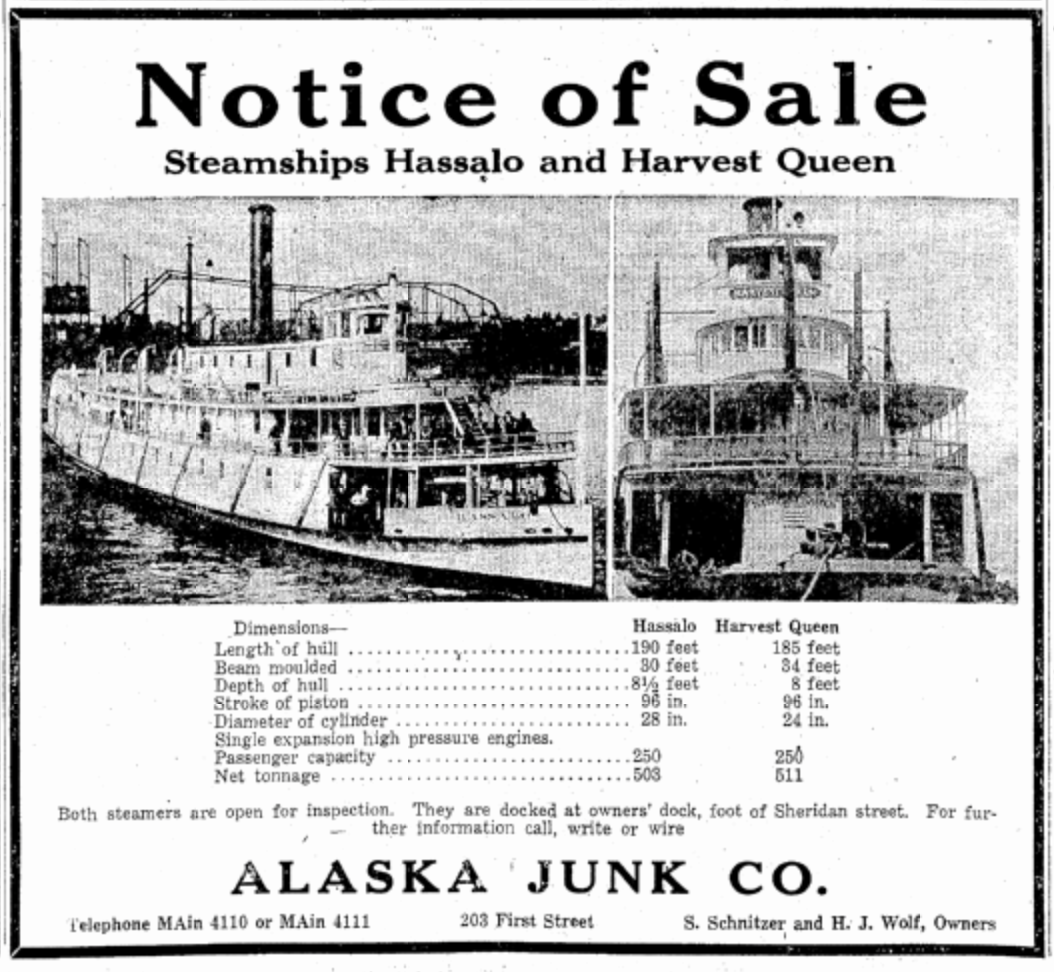
Notice of sale for Harvest Queen and Hassalo, published in The Sunday Oregon, July 4, 1926.

On June 30, 1926, the Oregon-Washington Railway and Navigation Company, the legal successor to the O.R.&N, sold Harvest Queen and Hassalo to Alaska Junk Company. The retirement of these two vessels from the once large O-W R.&.N. fleet left only two steamers remaining, the small propeller Nahcotta, then running as a ferry between Astoria and Megler, Washington, and the then new sternwheeler Lewiston, built in 1923 and operating on the Snake River. At the time of the sale, both Harvest Queen and Hassalo were moored in the Willamette River at Albina.

On June 30, 1926, the date of the sale, both vessels were moved to south Portland and tied up at a dock built for ships during the First World War by the Northwest Steel company.

Harvest Queen and Hassalo had been out of service since at least February 1, 1925, tied up next to the old T.J. Potter, all of them once considered some of the fastest and most prestigious vessels on the river.

On July 4, 1926, Alaska Junk Company, owned by Sam Schnitzer (1880–1952) and H.J. Wolf, offered Harvest Queen and Hassalo, a similar vessel, for sale. Abandoned in the Willamette River, in the first part of 1927 Harvest Queen sank near Ross Island. A few months later, in early June 1927, the steamer's pilot house broke free during rising storm waters and floated downriver, causing a mistaken report of a sunken vessel to be filed with the harbor patrol.

== Plans and model ==
Plans of the hull lines of the Harvest Queen are in the collection of the Oregon Historical Society. A model of the Harvest Queen is at the Columbia Gorge Discovery center in The Dalles, Oregon.
