= Jennie Clark =

American steamboat

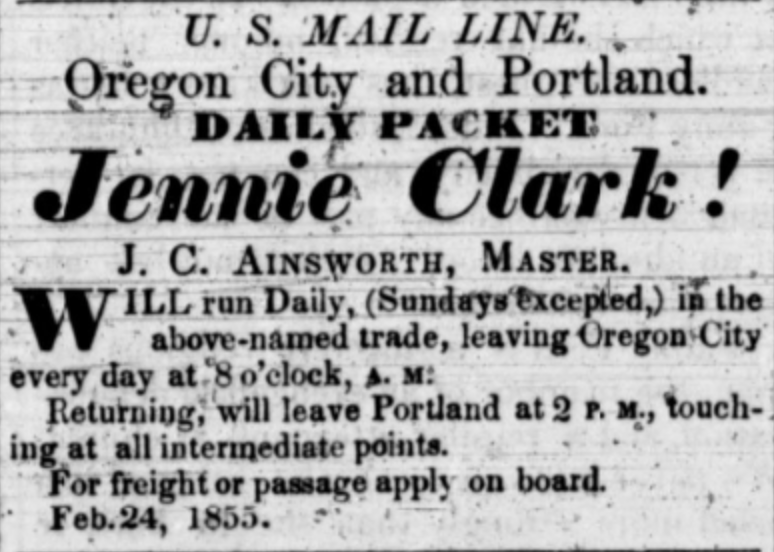

History
- Name: Jenny Clark
- Owner: Jacob Kamm, John C. Ainsworth, George Abernethy and others
- Route: Willamette, Columbia and Lewis and Clark rivers
- Maiden voyage: February, 1855
- Out of service: 1863
- Fate: Dismantled 1863; hull burned for scrap iron, 1865.

General characteristics
- Type: inland shallow draft passenger/freighter/towboat
- Length: 115 ft (35 m) measured over hull
- Beam: 18.5 ft (6 m) measured over hull
- Depth: 4.0 ft (1 m) depth of hold
- Propulsion: twin steam engines; sternwheelwheels
- Notes: Engines later installed on sternwheeler Forty-Nine, built in 1865.

Jennie Clark, also seen spelled Jenny Clark, was the first sternwheel-driven steamboat to operate on the rivers of the Pacific Northwest, including British Columbia. This vessel was commonly known as the Jennie when it was in service. The design of the Jennie Clark set a pattern for all future sternwheel steamboats built in the Pacific Northwest and in British Columbia.

== Design and construction ==
Jacob Kamm and John C. Ainsworth built Jennie Clark at Milwaukie, Oregon in 1855. Jennie Clark was the first sternwheeler built in the Pacific Northwest. The hull and upper works were built at Milwaukie, while her engines were built in Baltimore to Kamm's specifications, for a price of $1,663.16, and shipped around to the West Coast, which cost another $1,030.02.

Kamm and Ainsworth had settled on the sternwheeler as superior to propeller-driven and side-wheel boats. Propellers were too vulnerable to expensive damage to propellers and shafts from rocks and other obstructions in the river. Sidewheelers were too difficult to steer and needed expensive dock facilities.

Jennie Clark was 115 feet (or 118 feet), measured over the hull, which excluded the extension of the main deck over the stern, which mounted the sternwheel. The width of the vessel, called "beam" was 18.5 feet measured over the hull and excluding the extensions, called the "guards" running along the top of the hull. The depth of hold was 4 feet. The boat was built with a very light draft and was specifically designed for the route on the Willamette river from Portland to Oregon City.

There was a single cabin built on the hull, with the boiler in the middle The passenger cabin was located forward of the boiler, even though Kamm would have preferred the cabin to have been placed somewhere else. On top of the main cabin was the pilot house, from which the vessel was steered. The smokestack was behind the pilot house.

== Engineering ==
Jennie Clark was driven by a sternwheel turned by two horizontally mounted steam engines, which had been manufactured in Baltimore, Maryland. The engines were connected so that one man could operate both.

Each engine had a single piston which measured 12 inches on the inside bore, and drove a piston rod with a stroke of 48 inches. Each piston rod in turn drove a 16-foot-long iron rod called a pitman arm which turned a crank pin on the sternwheel. The sternwheel itself was 15 feet in diameter.

== Ownership ==
Jacob Kamm owned a one-half interest in the steamer, with John C. Ainsworth holding a one-quarter interest, and the firm of Ainsworth & Clark holding the other one-quarter interest. According to another source, the last one-quarter interest was held by two Oregon City merchants, George Abernethy and Ransom Clark. Abernethy, who had been governor of Oregon under the provisional government in the late 1840s, had experience in the steamboat business, having been the Oregon City agent for the Lot Whitcomb, a boat then recently transferred to California from the Willamette river.

Later Kamm sold a three-sixteenths interest to Josiah Myrick, who then took command of the vessel. Ainsworth’s share was then purchased by Theodore Wygant.

== Placed in service on the Willamette ==
Although compared to later steamers, Jennie Clark was a primitive design, the essential features proved to be the model for almost all other steamers later built in the Northwest. The sternwheel design was recognized in March 1855 as superior to the side-wheelers which up until then had been the dominant craft. Jennie Clark could steam up the rapids driven by the sternwheel alone, when the side-wheelers were forced to line through, that is, stop the boat below the rapids, run out a line or a cable to a tree or rock alongside the river, wrap the line around a windlass and crank in the line, drawing the vessel up through the rapids.

In February 1855, two steamboats were running daily between Oregon City, and Portland, the Jennie Clark and the Portland. John C. Ainsworth commanded Jennie Clark at that time. Jennie Clark departed Oregon City for Portland at 8:00 a.m. every day except Sunday, and departed Portland at 2:00 p.m., stopping at intermediate landings. The steamer held a contract to carry the U.S. mail. Persons seeking passage or to ship freight were to apply on board.

In March, Jennie Clark’s competitor, the sidewheeler Portland, was the evening boat from Oregon City to Portland, running under Capt. Alexander S. Murray. By April, 1855, both Jennie Clark and Portland were running on the same schedule, departing Oregon City at 8:00 a.m., and Portland at 2:00 p.m.

== Role during the Yakima War ==
On March 26, 1856, during the Yakima War, the settlements at the Cascades were attacked by Native Americans. The territorial government called up volunteers, and Jennie Clark, under Capt. John C. Ainsworth, carried a company of them from Portland up to the Cascades. Overly apprehensive about ambush, the party sought to protect the captain by lining the interior of the pilot house with three-inch-thick oak planks, and then piling sacks of flour stacked up against the walls.

The Jennie arrived on March 28, 1856. By that time, 350 soldiers and volunteers already on the scene under the command of Lt. Philip Sheridan had defeated and dispersed the Native Americans. Jenny Clark’s company of late-arriving volunteers were greeted with jeers from the troops who had done the fighting.

Jennie Clark then returned to Portland in four hours and 45 minutes, considered remarkable time for the period, with the news, and the volunteer company, whose services were thought to be in need in Portland due to exaggerated fears of a potential attack on that city.

== Difficulties in low water ==
In November 1857 a dry warm spell caused a fall in the level of the Willamette River so that Jennie Clark had to stop at the foot of the Clackamas Rapids. In January 1858, there was talk that the owners of Jennie Clark intended to put a shallow draft boat on the Willamette River that could negotiate the Clackamas Rapids at all times of the year. In the August 1858 low water season, Jennie Clark’s owners placed into service a steam-powered flat boat to transport the Jennie’s freight over the Clackamas Rapids.

In August 1860, low water in the Willamette River forced Jennie Clark, then running under Captain Myrick, to be laid up. The route between Portland and Oregon City was carried on by the steamers Rival and Express.

== Towing newly built Carrie Ladd ==
In October 1858, a new sternwheel steamer, the Carrie Ladd, was completed at Oregon City for Jacob Kamm, John C. Ainsworth, and their associates. On Thursday October 28, 1858, Jennie Clark towed the new steamer downriver to Portland to have the machinery installed.

== Collision with Express ==
On Friday evening, November 16, 1860, at about 6:00 p.m., when running upriver from Portland, at a narrow spot in the river just upstream from Oswego, Jennie Clark collided with the steamer Express. The bow of the Jennie struck right in the middle of the Express cutting halfway through the hull of the Express. The Express was run into the shore, but sank shortly thereafter. The passengers from Express were taken on board the Jennie, which returned to Portland. As of November 24, 1860, efforts to raise Express were underway, and were expected to be successful. Total loss to Express reported to have been estimated at $3,000. Jennie Clark sustained only minor damage.

== Service with the Oregon Steam Navigation Company ==
In 1860, Jennie Clark became one of the initial steamers of the combined firm of Ainsworth, Kamm, and others. This combination was first known as the Union Transportation company. Within a short time, the concern was incorporated as the Oregon Steam Navigation Company which came to have a near-monopoly on river transport on the Columbia, and, for a time the Willamette rivers.

=== Placement on Longview mail run ===
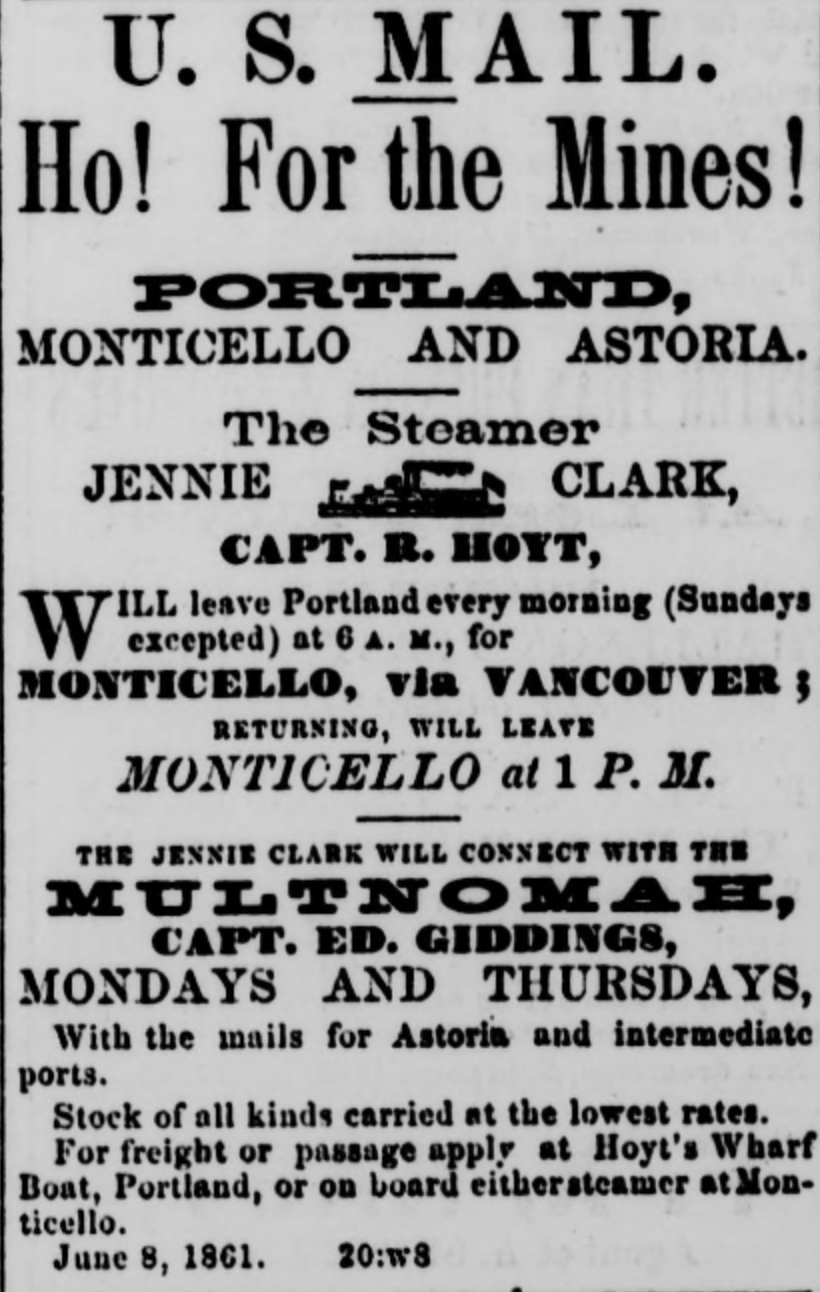
Advertisement for Jennie Clark, placed in Washington Standard (Olympia, O.T., June 8, 1861.

In May 1861, Jennie Clark was running on a route from Portland to Longview, Washington, which was then known as Monticello. The Express had been originally intended to run on this route, but was prevented from doing so by an accident, apparently the sinking the previous fall. The owners of Jennie Clark held a contract to carry the mails from Portland to Monticello, where they went overland to Olympia. Once Jennie Clark was on the route, mail took 36 hours to reach Olympia from Portland.

In June 1861, Jennie Clark, under Capt. R. Hoyt, left Hoyt’s wharf boat in Portland every morning, except Sundays, at 6:00 a.m. for Longview, carrying the U.S. mail, and stopping at Vancouver along the way. Returning to Portland, Jennie Clark departed Longview at 1:00 p.m. A connection was made every Monday and Thursday at Longview with the sidewheeler Multnomah, under Capt. Ed Giddings, with the mails for Astoria and intermediate points.

=== Seaside route ===
In July 1862, Jennie Clark was transferred to a route running to Clatsop Landing on the Lewis and Clark River, and thus became the first of many boats making regular seaside runs from Portland. When the Jenny came downriver from Portland, the boat did not stop at Astoria, as this was already served by daily steamers. Instead, the boat proceeded into Young’s Bay and then up the Lewis and Clark river to Fort Clatsop, where the passengers disembarked. From there, the passengers could walk or hire horses or carriages the short distance to the beach at Seaside. Round trip fare for the seaside run was fifteen dollars.

== Removed from service ==
In 1863, Jennie Clark was removed from service. The engines were removed and sent far up the Columbia River near the Canada-U.S. border, at the 49th parallel, to be placed in the steamer Forty-Nine. In 1865 the hulk of the Jennie Clark was dismantled and the hull burned for the iron.
