= Undine (Columbia River sternwheeler) =

American passenger steamboat

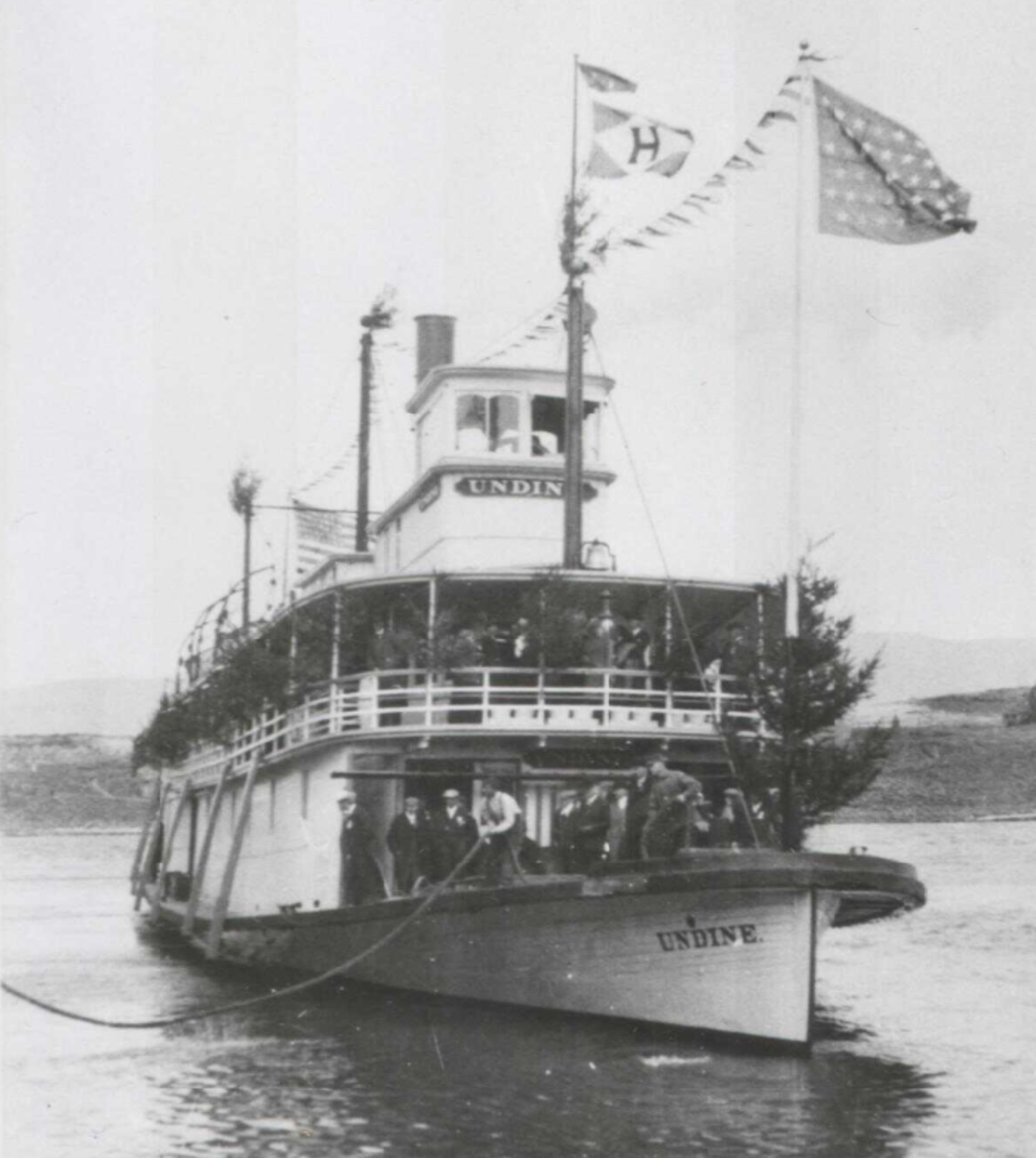
- Undine on Columbia River on way to opening of the Celilo Canal, May 3, 1915.

History
- Name: Undine (1887-1935); The Dalles (1935-1940)
- Owner: Vancouver Trans. Co. (1888)
- In service: 1887
- Out of service: 1940
- Identification: US #25266 (1887-1921); #221499 (1921-1935); #221499 (1935-1940)
- Fate: Scrapped 1940

General characteristics
- Length: 150 ft (45.72 m)(1888-1917)
- Beam: 27 ft (8.23 m)(1888-1917)
- Depth: 6 ft (1.83 m) depth of hold
- Installed power: twin steam engines, horizontally mounted: cylinder bore 16.25 in (41 cm); stroke 6 ft 0 in (182.9 cm)
- Propulsion: stern-wheel
- Capacity: 450 passengers on excursions (1890)

Undine was a sternwheel-driven steamboat that operated from 1887 to 1935 on the Columbia and lower Willamette rivers. From 1935 to 1940 the same vessel was operated under the name The Dalles.

Undine was built at Portland, Oregon by shipbuilder J.H. Steffen for pioneer businessman Jacob Kamm and worked on the route along the lower Columbia river from Portland to Astoria, Oregon. Undine was rebuilt in 1917 for the Harkins Transportation Company and rebuilt again in 1921. The Harkins line ran Undine until 1935 when it was sold and renamed The Dalles. The Dalles was dismantled in 1940.

This vessel should not be confused with the Colorado River sternwheeler Undine.

== Construction ==
Undine was built by J.H. Steffen for Jacob Kamm and launched on January 3, 1888. Undine made its trial trip from Portland, Oregon to Vancouver, W.T. on Tuesday afternoon, March 20, 1888. Undine made the 18 mile return trip to Portland in one hour and twenty minutes. By May 1888, running for Kamm's Vancouver Transportation Company, Undine was able to cut the time from Vancouver to Portland down to 58 minutes running on 100 pounds of steam. Only two steamers had managed better time on this run, Lurline in 57 minutes, and Telephone, in 55 minutes.

As built, Undine was 150 ft (45.72 m) long, exclusive of the extension of the main deck over the stern, called the fantail, on which the stern-wheel was mounted. The beam was 27 ft (8.23 m) (exclusive of guards and the depth of hold was 6 ft (1.83 m). The official merchant vessel registry number was 25266.

Undine was driven by a stern-wheel, which was turned by twin steam engines, horizontally mounted: cylinder bore 16.25 in (41.3 cm); stroke 6 ft 0 in (183 cm). The machinery was installed by C.W. Evans.

== Early career ==
Undine was built for the route from Portland to Vancouver, Washington. From 1888 to 1895 Undine ran primarily on this route, with occasional trips to Astoria, Oregon and excursion runs. Undine made its trial trip from Portland to Vancouver and return on Tuesday afternoon, March 20, 1888. The return trip to Portland took 120 minutes.

In early May 1888, Undine made the 18 mile run from Vancouver to Portland in 58 minutes carrying 100 pounds of steam. Undine was then owned by the Vancouver Transportation Company. This time had been beaten only twice before, once by Lurline in 57 minutes, and once by Telephone, in 55 minutes.

On August 24, 1890, it was reported that Undine had been sold and would be taken to Puget Sound. This sale and transfer never occurred.

=== Excursion business ===
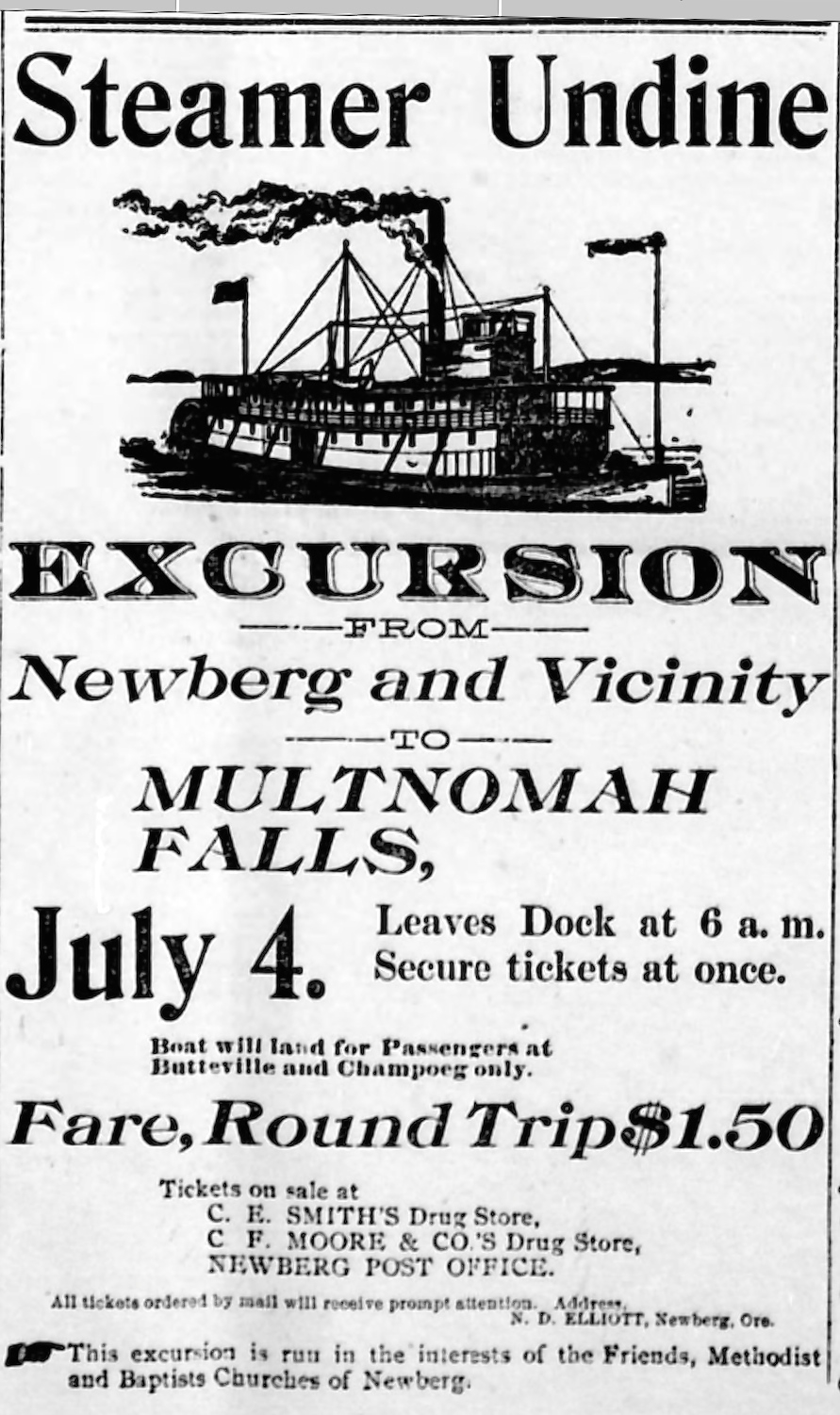
Advertisement for excursion on Undine, placed June 24, 1898.

In May 1890, Undine could be chartered for $250 for an excursion from Portland to Oregon City, Oregon. Other boats could be hired for much less. An excursion ticket in May 1890 cost $1.00. On a school excursion on the evening of Monday, May 19, 1890, from Portland to Oregon City, Undine carried 450 passengers, of which there were about 300 who paid fares.

There were professional organizers of steamboat excursions, one of whom in 1889 was J.J. Hauser. Hauser's method was to book a band, charter a steamboat, and sell tickets, hopefully making a profit. Sometimes this worked for him, and he could make $200 on a single excursion, as he did on July 4, 1889, when he charted Multnomah.

Other times, such as on Saturday, July 27, 1889, he lost money, about $150, when he charted Undine for a Portland-Astoria run, hired the band of the First Regiment, Oregon National Guard, but was not able to sell many tickets.

Excursion managers booked Undine for a trip from Newberg, Oregon up the Columbia river on Saturday, June 20, 1891. Undine carried 360 passengers on this excursion. The managers were said to have cleared $130.

=== Towing work ===
Steamers like Undine were capable of being worked in multiple roles. In addition to passenger and freight carriage, Undine was also used as a tow boat. For example, on June 30, 1890, Undine towed a barge from Kalama, Washington laden with a steam locomotive and a passenger coach intended for the Ilwaco Railway and Navigation Company.

=== Officers in the early years ===
Captain Charles Tilton Kamm, son of Jacob Kamm, was master of Undine until 1892 when he was succeeded by Joseph H. Burgy, who commanded the boat at least through 1895. William S. Buchanan also commanded Undine in August 1892.

For the most part of Undine’s early years, Fred S. Shepard was the boat's chief engineer and Frank Malmquist was its purser. W.S. Chapman was the steward of Undine in 1891. In October 1906, Capt Archibald L. “Scotty” McNeill (1866–1935), pilot of Lurline, took over command of Undine from Capt. Kane Olney.

== Casualties ==
On the night of September 3, 1891, near Vancouver, Washington, crewmen on Undine found and recovered from the Columbia river the body of a Native American man whose hands had been tied by a chain wrapped around his body, and the chain secured to a heavy piece of railroad iron. The body was later identified as that of one Sturgeon Jim, who resided near Washougal, Washington, who had been missing for nine days since having a dispute with another man, Murder charges were brought against the other man upon discovery of the body.

On March 24, 1898, a crew member on Undine, S.H. Svensson, drowned at Rainier, Oregon while he and others were unloading a large cylinder from the steamer on to the dock. Svensson's estate later filed a legal action against Vancouver Transportation Co., seeking $5000 in damages and alleging that the company's negligence, specifically not securing the gangplank, insufficient lighting, and failure to properly tie up the steamer caused Svensson's death. Svensson left an aged father, a wife and four children as dependents.

On April 17, 1906, Captain Burgy died in his cabin on board Undine.

== Rescue of Telephone passengers ==
At 3:00 a.m on January 5, 1891, after the elite sternwheeler Telephone, with William E. Larkins (1857–1908) in command, sank following a collision with the breakwater at the mouth of the Willamette River, the eighty-five passengers of Telephone were taken off by Bonita, transferred to Undine and then carried into Portland. When Telephone did not arrive on time in Portland, there were concerns that the boat had been sunk, perhaps in the middle of the river by colliding with one of the many large snags or saw logs that were common at that time.

When Undine came into the dock at Portland at 10:15 a.m., there were many shouted inquiries from the people gathered ashore about the Telephone. The reply from Undine, “Passengers all safe and aboard this boat” was received gladly by the crowd.

== Troop transport ==
On May 12, 1894, regular U.S. army troops, 225 in number, from the Vancouver Army Barracks were ordered to proceed to Seattle, Washington to address the civil disturbances that had arisen in connection with Coxey's Army. Undine transported the troops from Vancouver to Kalama, Washington where they disembarked to proceed to Seattle by train. On May 30, 1894, the four companies of troops returned to the Vancouver Barracks from Seattle, being carried from Kalama to Vancouver on Undine.

== Portland-Vancouver route 1895 ==
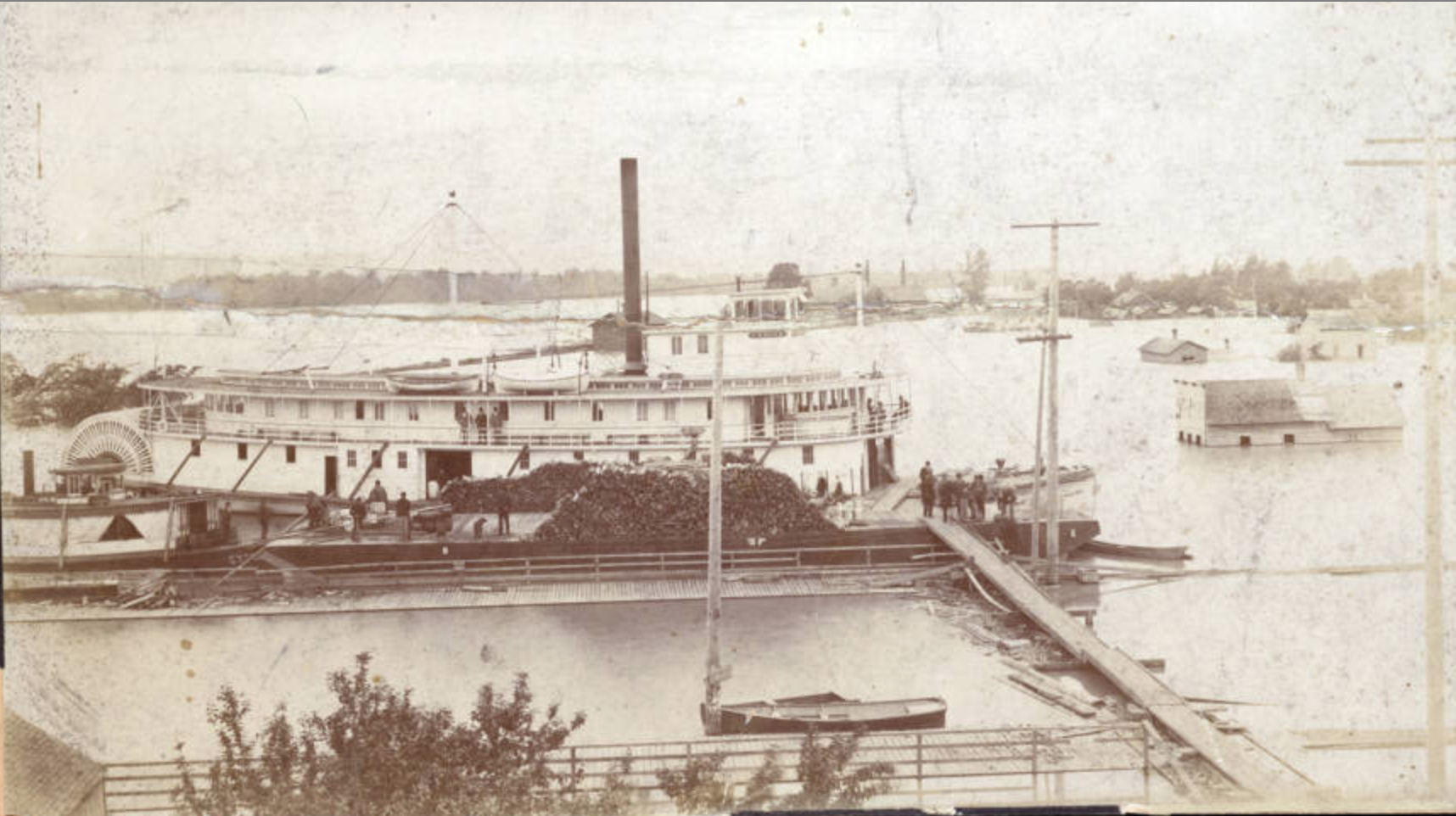
Undine at Clark County, WA, June 1894.

As of 1895 Undine was making two round trips a day, Sundays excepted, on the Portland-Vancouver route. In January 1896 Undine, under Captain Charles T. Kamm, departed from Vancouver twice a day at 8:30 a.m. and 1:00 p.m. Undine left Portland from the Taylor Street dock at 10:30 a.m. and 4:30 p.m. for Vancouver. For freight or passage, application was made on board. Round trip fare was 25 cents. Undine continued on this schedule until at least April 28, 1900.

On July 24, 1896, Undine broke a stern-wheel shaft near the mouth of the Willamette River. The initial plan was to have Undine taken out of service for about 10 days, during which it would be replaced on its route by Mascot. This changed to keeping it in service with only one engine operating. On July 27, 1896 Undine made the run from Vancouver to Portland with one engine in one hour and 28 minutes.

== Columbia Gorge route ==
In March 1905 Undine was hauled out, for the first time in twelve years, at the Portland Shipbuilding Company's yard. The hull was found to be in remarkably good condition, requiring replacement of only a few planks at the bow and the stern. Undine was scheduled for a thorough overall of its machinery and structure, which was expected to take about two months.

In August 1905 Undine was employed on sightseeing trips up the Columbia River to Cascade Locks and Canal. Undine departed from the Taylor Street dock at 8:30 a.m. and returned at 6:00 p.m. Round trip fare was $1.50.

On February 11, 1906, Undine was secured by The Dalles, Portland & Astoria Navigation Company, also known as the Regulator Line, to connect with the sternwheeler Bailey Gatzert at the Cascades on the route up the Columbia river to The Dalles, Oregon. The change was made necessary by need to find a replacement for the sternwheeler Dalles City, which had sunk at Curtis Landing a few days before.

Dalles City was returned to service on March 16, 1906, after which Undine was hauled out at Portland Shipbuilding for a hull inspection. Undine was back in service a few days later, on the Vancouver route.

== Funeral of Sheriff John R. Shaver ==
On May 2, 1906, a funeral was held at the Oregon City courthouse for John R. Shaver, sheriff of Clackamas County, who had been shot a few days earlier by desperado Frank Smith near Woodburn, Oregon. Although he had chosen a career in law enforcement, Shaver was a member of a prominent steamboating family. At the conclusion of the funeral, Undine carried the remains to River View Cemetery to be interred in the Shaver family plot.

== Opening of Celilo Canal ==
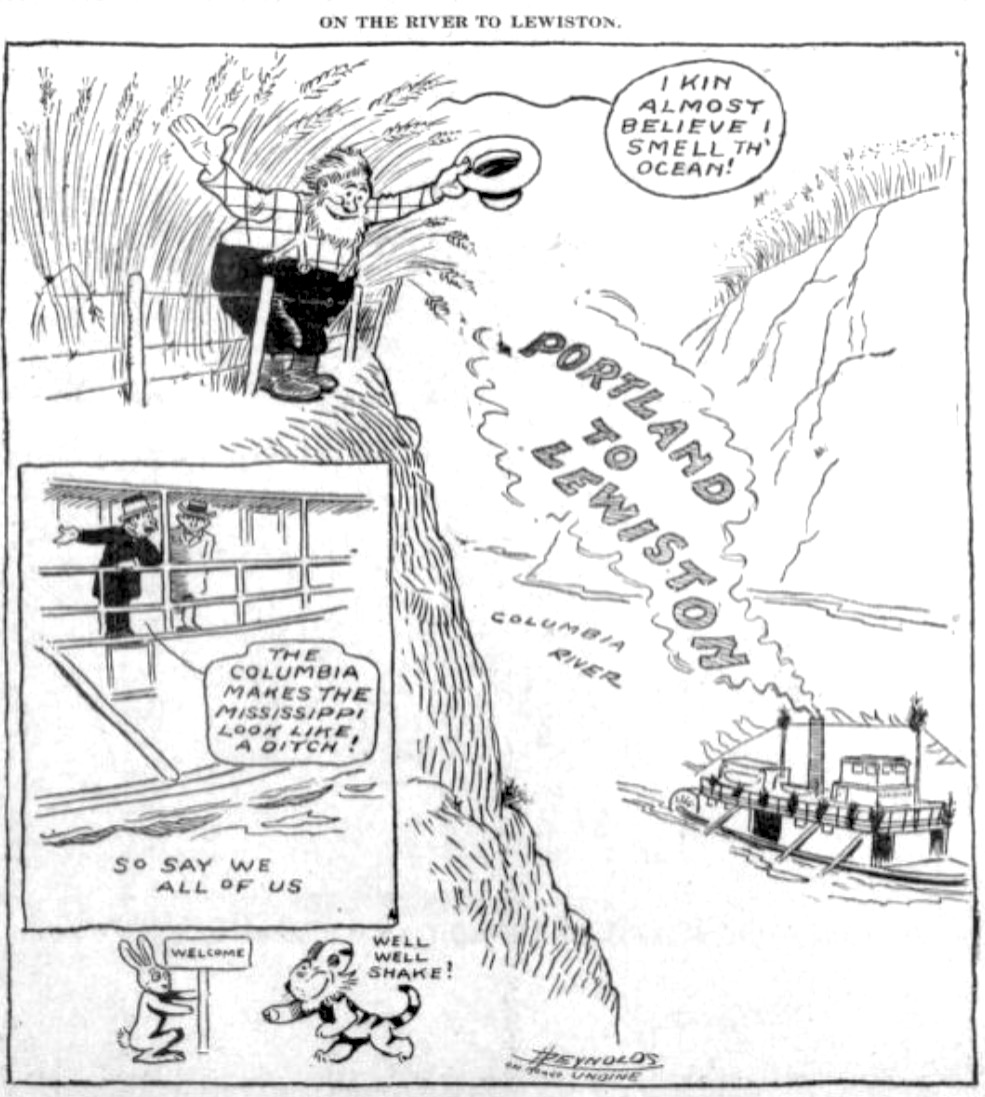
Cartoon published in the Morning Oregonian, marking the transit of Undine from Portland to Lewiston, Idaho through the newly completed Celilo Canal, May 1915

When the Celilo Canal was opened in 1915, Undine, carrying a number of dignitaries, became the first steamboat to transit the canal downstream from Celilo to Astoria, Oregon.

In late April 1932, Undine was operated by the Mid-Columbia Navigation Company, which announced plans for Undine to make its first run on a route from Portland to The Dalles, Oregon, arriving on at The Dalles on the night of April 26, 1932 with a cargo from Portland of sugar. Undine would return to Portland with a new crop of wool brought in by trucks from Yakima, Washington.

The Mid-Columbia Navigation Company was organized by Thomas Larkin, president and general manager, L.N. Chambreau, traffic representative, Edward Spockerman, general manager, Robert Irish, purchasing manager, Frank Raicy, vice-president and assistant manager, C.C. Thompson, secretary and treasurer, and Harold Johnston, counsel.

== Forced sale ==
On July 11, 1932, crewmen who were employed on Undine during March and April of that year brought suit in the United States District Court to force the sale of the steamer and “her engines, tackle, apparatus and furniture” to satisfy their claims for wages. The case name was Samuel H. Shaver et al. vs. Steamer Undine. On August 1, 1932, a motion for an order to the U.S. marshal to sell the boat was presented for hearing before U.S. district court judge John H. McNary (1867–1936). In November 1932, by order of the court, the U.S. Marshal service sold Undine to William Greenberg.

== Change of name to The Dalles ==
On October 31, 1935, the Bureau of Navigation and Steamboat Inspection, through Milton A. Miller, Collector of Customs, announced that it had granted permission to Undine, official number 221499, to change its name to The Dalles.

== Disposition ==
The Dalles (ex Undine) was scrapped in 1940.
