= Lurline (1878 sternwheeler) =

Streamboat

- Lurline at Cathlamet, Washington circa 1903

History
- Name: Lurline
- Owner: Vancouver Transportation Co. others later, including Harkins Transportation Co.
- Route: Columbia River
- Builder: Designed by Jacob Kamm; joiner work by James Reed
- Cost: $40,000
- In service: 1878
- Out of service: about 1930
- Fate: Dismantled, upper works to L.P. Hosford, hull abandoned near Government Island on Columbia River

General characteristics
- Type: Inland steamship
- Tonnage: 481 gross tonnage; 338 registered tonnage
- Length: 155 ft (47 m) length of keel, 175 ft (53 m) overall
- Beam: 30 ft (9 m)
- Draft: 3.0 ft (1 m)
- Depth: 6.5 ft (2 m) depth of hold
- Decks: three (freight/engines, passenger, hurricane)
- Installed power: twin horizontal steam engines, 18" bore by 72" stroke, constructed by Marlan & Hollingsworth. Locomotive-type tubular boiler, constructed by Ward, Stanton & Co, Newburgh, NY.
- Propulsion: sternwheel, 18 ft (5 m) , 17 buckets, each bucket 16.0 ft (5 m) long, 24 inches wide, with 26 inch dip.
- Speed: about 17 miles per hour maximum

Lurline was a steamboat that served from 1878 to 1930 on the Columbia and Willamette rivers. Lurline was a classic example of the Columbia river type of steamboat.

== Construction ==
Lurline was launched September 30, 1878 by Jacob Kamm, who with John C. Ainsworth had designed and built the first sternwheelers in the Northwest, Jennie Clark and Carrie Ladd, nearly a quarter of a century before.

== Operations on the Columbia ==
Capt. James T. Gray took charge of the Lurline and handled her on the Vancouver route for the first ten years of her career. During the summer season she made one trip a week in the seaside traffic, and occasionally towed ships, competing with the Oregon Railway & Navigation Company's steamers. Competition from the Lurline was said to have cost the Oregon Railway & Navigation Company over half a million dollars. In 1889 that company leased her, and, in command of Captain Pillsbury, she was operated on the Cascade route until 1892 when Kamm again commenced regular trips to Astoria. Among her many captains was Charles T. Kamm, son of her designer.

== Hassalo excursion 1888 ==
Lurline was used to carry some of the 3,000 excursionists who gathered to witness Hassalo run the Cascades of the Columbia on Saturday, May 26, 1888, making the run up from Portland in the company of another famous sternwheeler, the R.R. Thompson, the Lurline having also embarked an army band from Vancouver Barracks. The Sunday Oregonian's correspondent described the trip up the river on that historic day:

Promptly at 8 o'clock the R.R. Thompson gave the departing whistle, cast off lines and started down the river, leaving the Lurline to remain for a short time at the wharf to bring those who came a little late. However the Lurline did not stop long, but soon came steaming in the wake of the Thompson. ... Lively airs were discoursed by the military band, which lent additional interest to the occasion, and caused the time to pass rapidly. ... Less than an hour's steaming brought the boat to Vancouver. Here a few more excursionists joined the crowd. A few minutes after 9 o'clock the Thompson turned her prow toward the great gorge of the Columbia. Soon after leaving Vancouver the Lurline came alongside, with colors gaily streaming in the wind. The two steamers were lashed together and proceeded for several miles side by side. Finding better time could be made separately, the steamers were unloosened, and each steamed ahead, keeping most of the time within easy hailing distance. Fully 1500 persons were on the two boats.

== Later years ==
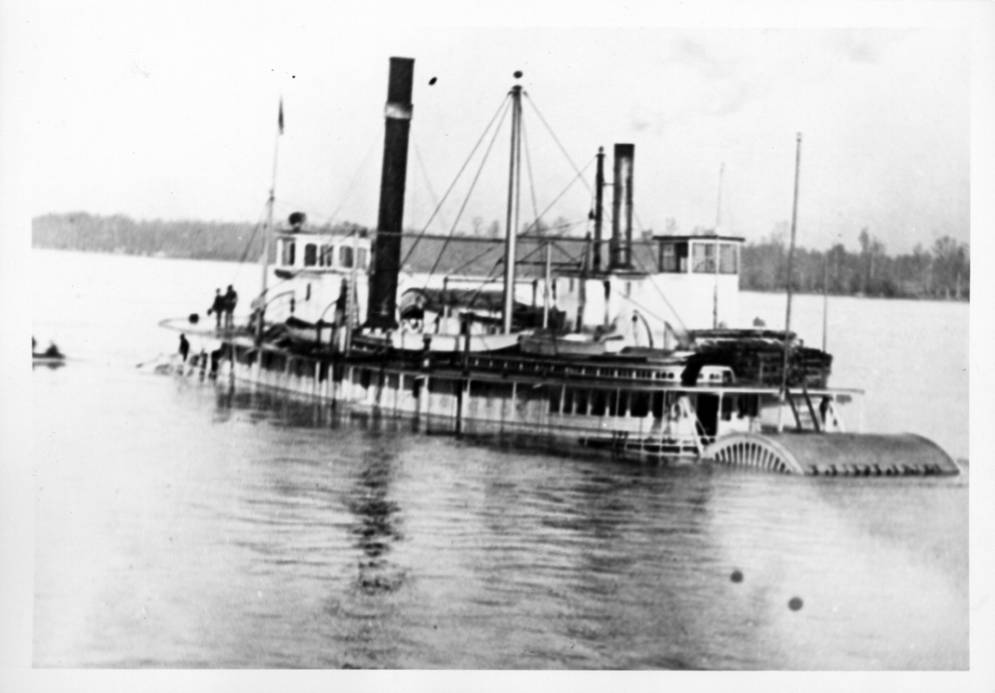
Lurline sunk off Rainier, Oregon, with sternwheeler Nestor alongside.

Lurline served for over 50 years, a very long time for a wooden steamboat. in later years she came to be owned by the Harkins Transportation Company of Portland, Oregon.

On November 9, 1894, Lurline, under Captain James T. Gray, collided with the sternwheeler Sarah Dixon, under Captain George M. Shaver, in a thick fog near Kalama, Washington. Damage to both vessels was minor, $50 worth to Lurline and $150 to Sarah Dixon. Even so, following a hearing on December 10, 1894, both captains, who were prominent steamboat men, were found to be at fault for violating the navigation rules, and their licenses were suspended for seven days.

Lurline was rebuilt several times, and survived being rammed and sunk at Rainier, Oregon on November 21, 1906, by the steam schooner Cascade. Lurline never acquired the reputation of a speedy boat like the Bailey Gatzert, but she did valuable service just the same:

The Lurline and Undine of the Harkins Transportation Company let the racers like the T.J. Potter, Telephone, and Bailey Gatzert burn grooves on the river route between Portland and Astoria. The ambled along at an easier pace, made more frequent stops, and were the favorites of isolated villagers and farmers along the way.

== Out of service ==
Lurline was dismantled in about 1930. Her upper works were still in good condition despite having been built some 52 years before. The cabins and other above deck structures were transferred to a new vessel, the diesel-powered L.P. Hosford which was still in operation as late as 1966.

In 1983, a new diesel-powered sternwheeler built for tourism purposes was given the name Lurdine – a union of Lurline and Undine – as a tribute to those two past vessels. However, Lurdine was renamed Rose less than two years later, after a change of ownership and location.
