= Nez Perce Chief (sternwheeler) =

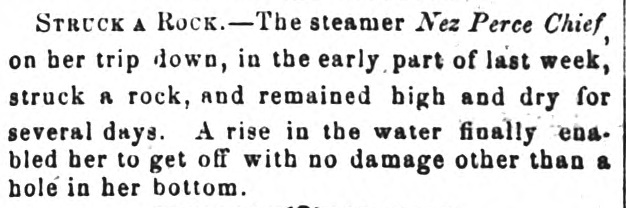
- News item on Nez Perce Chief from the Walla Walla Statesman, December 25, 1868

History
- Name: Nez Perce Chief
- Owner: Oregon Steam Navigation Company
- In service: 1863 (built at Celilo, Oregon)
- Out of service: 1874
- Identification: US registry #18399
- Fate: Dismantled

General characteristics
- Type: inland shallow-draft passenger/freighter, all wooden construction
- Tonnage: 327 gross
- Length: 126 ft (38 m)
- Beam: 25 ft (8 m)
- Depth: 5.0 ft (2 m) depth of hold
- Installed power: steam, high-pressure twin engines, horizontally mounted 16" bore by 66", stroke, 17 horsepower nominal
- Propulsion: sternwheel

Nez Perce Chief was a steamboat that operated on the upper Columbia River, in Washington, U.S., specifically the stretch of the river that began above the Celilo Falls. Her engines came from the Carrie Ladd, an important earlier sternwheeler. Nez Perce Chief also ran up the Snake River to Lewiston, Idaho, a distance of 141 miles from the mouth of the Snake River near Wallula, Wash. Terr.

== Operations in gold rush ==
During the 1860s there was a gold rush in Idaho, and Nez Perce Chief and other steamboats of the Oregon Steam Navigation Company were key links in the transportation of miners and equipment upriver to the gold fields, and in transporting gold mined from the fields out. On one trip downriver at the height of the gold rush Nez Perce Chief carried $382,000 worth of gold dust and bars locked in the captain's safe.

== Transfer to other parts of the Columbia River ==
In 1870, Nez Perce Chief was brought down through Celilo Falls to The Dalles, where she operated on the middle river, that is, the stretch between The Dalles and the rapids downriver known as the Cascades of the Columbia, that began near where the modern town of Cascade Locks is located. On July 6, 1871, with Capt. John C. Ainsworth in personal command, she was brought down through the Cascades to the lower Columbia River.
