= Carrie Ladd =

Steamboat

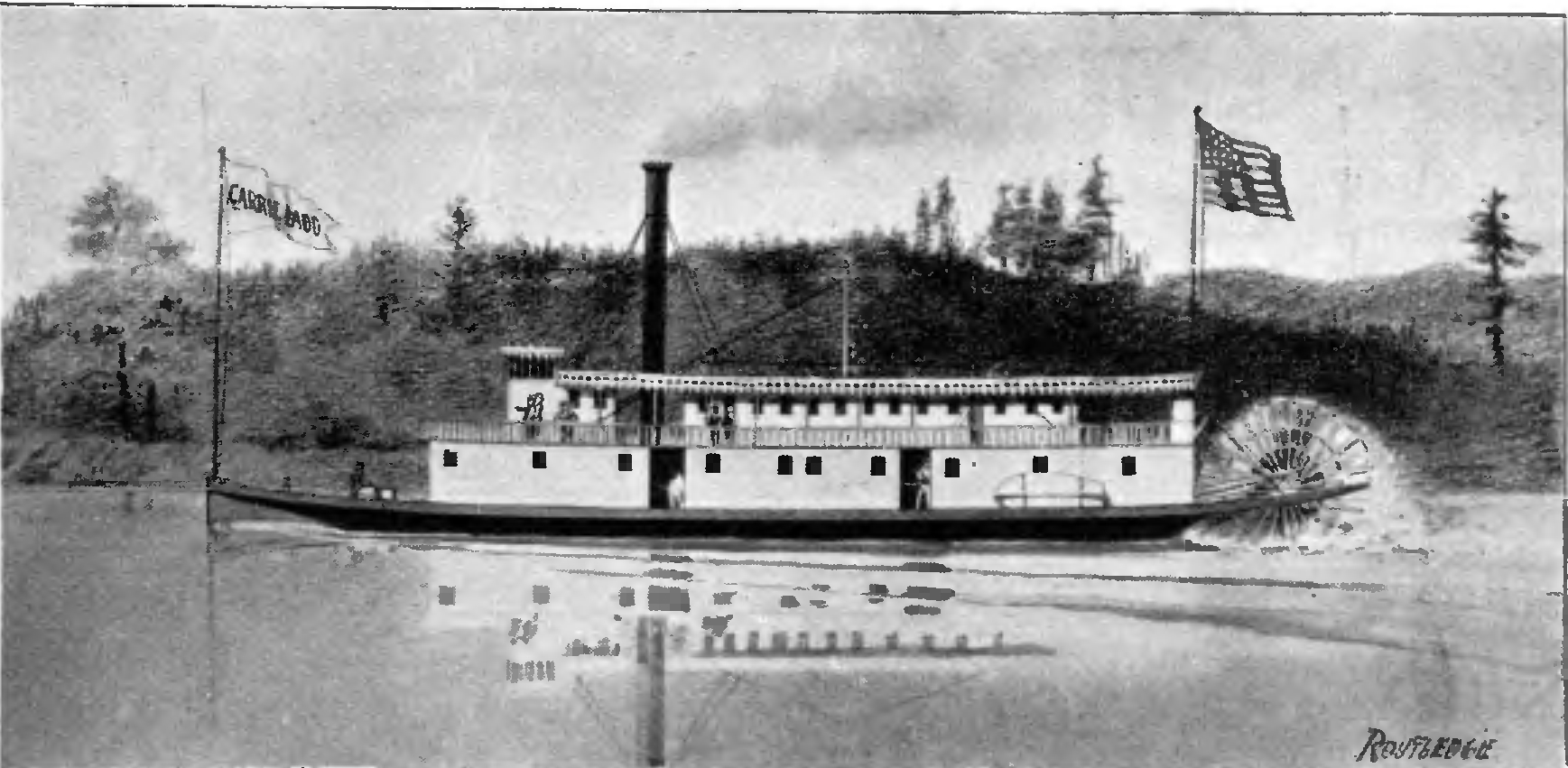
- Carrie Ladd

History
- Owner: John C. Ainsworth and Jacob Kamm
- Builder: John T. Thomas, Oregon City, Oregon
- Launched: October 1858
- Maiden voyage: February 9, 1859
- Out of service: 1864
- Fate: Dismantled, converted to engines to Nez Perce Chief
- Notes: Acquired by Oregon Steam Navigation Company in 1860.

General characteristics
- Type: inland shallow draft steamboat, wooden hull
- Tonnage: 128 gross
- Length: 126 ft (38 m)
- Beam: 24.4 ft (7 m)
- Depth: 4.6 ft (1 m) depth of hold
- Installed power: steam, twin high-pressure engines, 16" bore by 66" stroke, horizontally mounted, 17 nominal horsepower, built in Wilmington, Delaware
- Propulsion: sternwheel

The Carrie Ladd was an important early steamboat on the lower Columbia and lower Willamette rivers. The vessel established the basic design of the Columbia River steamboat, which was later used throughout the Pacific Northwest, British Columbia, Alaska, and the Yukon.

== Design, Ownership and Construction ==
Carrie Ladd was one of the first steamboats of the Columbia River type. Unlike most other early steamboats Carrie Ladd was built from scratch, rather from discarded hulls, works, or machinery of previous vessels. The vessel was not particularly large, but had powerful engines, and was probably the best of the steamboats built in Oregon in the 1850s. John T. Thomas built Carrie Ladd for Jacob Kamm, Capt. John C. Ainsworth and other co-owners. The vessel was named the Carrie Ladd in honor of the daughter of an early Portland banker who helped arrange the financing for the Oregon Steam Navigation Company which later held a monopoly on steam navigation on the Columbia River.

Carrie Ladd was launched at Oregon City in October, 1858. The vessel was fitted up in what was considered to be first-class style for the day. The design of the Carrie Ladd, together with that of the vessel 's predecessor Jennie Clark established the elements of the Columbia River steamer. The basic elements of the Columbia River steamer, as established by Carrie Ladd were described by Professor Mills:

A sternwheeler, she had a freight deck and cabin, a single tall stack centered, and a pilot house; inside, her cabins opened onto a parlor that could be used as a dining room. At one end, forward, was a 'Ladies Saloon', to which the delicate might retire to be away from tobacco and general male contamination. Boats became longer, and broader, and grander and faster, but they still turned back to the Carrie Ladd for their design.

== Operations ==
Captain Ainsworth took Carrie Ladd on her trial trip February 9, 1859, from Portland, Oregon to the lower Cascades by way of Vancouver, Wash. Terr. From Portland to Vancouver was 16 miles along the rivers. It was 53 miles from Portland to the lower Cascades.

Carrie Ladd covered the 16 miles to Vancouver in 1 hour 25 minutes, and the entire 53 miles to the lower Cascades in 5 hours 44 minutes. The return from the Cascades to Portland took 4 hours 38 minutes. These were rapid speeds for the time, especially compared to ground transport in that time of no roads. Originally it was intended to put Carrie Ladd on the run on the lower Willamette River from Portland south to Oregon City. However, shortly after the vessel was completed, the owners of Carrie Ladd formed the Union Transportation Company, the forerunner of the Oregon Steam Navigation Company ("OSN"), which was soon to control a monopoly on the river. Union Transportation was a pool of allied steamboat owners restricting competition and allocating the market among the pool members, and the pool assigned Carrie Ladd to the Columbia River.

Carrie Ladd received a larger share of the Columbia River traffic than any other steamer in the pool. Having excellent power Carrie Ladd found no difficulty in going right up to foot of the rapids at the Cascades. When the Julia Barclay was brought to Columbia River from Puget Sound there was a brief spell of competition on the Portland-Cascades route. This soon ended when OSN bought Julia. In the early 1860s, the two steamers ran alternately on the Cascades, each carrying from two hundred to three hundred passengers each time.

== Sinking, salvage, and withdrawal from service ==
On June 3, 1862, while in command of Capt. James Strang on the Columbia river, the Carrie Ladd struck a rock near Cape Horn, 18 miles below the Cascades, and sank. The passengers were rescued by the Mountain Buck and taken to the lower Cascades. Carrie Ladd was raised following her sinking, and resumed service, but the tremendous amount of work to which the vessel was subjected during its early career had weakened the boat, and in 1864 it was converted into a barge. The engines were reused in the Nez Perce Chief. In later years the Carrie Ladd 's boiler went to the Mountain Queen.
