= Lot Whitcomb =

American politician

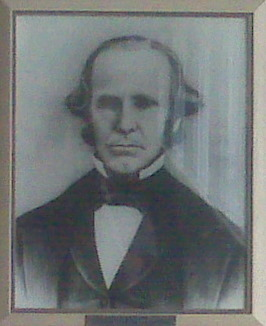
- Lot Whitcomb
- Born: April 24, 1807; Vermont
- Died: March 31, 1857 (aged 49); Oregon
- Resting place: River View Cemetery; 45°27′50.25″N 122°40′26.50″W
- Citizenship: U.S.
- Spouse: Irene Chamberlain
- Children: 4

Lot Whitcomb (1807–1857) was an American commercial entrepreneur and politician who established the city of Milwaukie, Oregon. After making a fortune milling and shipping lumber and timber for California gold miners, Whitcomb launched the first steamship in the U.S. state of Oregon.

== Biography ==
=== Early years ===
Lot Whitcomb was born in Vermont on April 24, 1807. He married the former Irene Chamberlain in 1828, and together they would have four children, all daughters. Around 1830 Whitcomb moved to Michigan, where he began work as a contractor. He subsequently moved to Illinois, where he served a term in the Illinois House of Representatives.

In the spring of 1847 Whitcomb and his family were part of a party of 13 families leaving Illinois for Missouri in order to take the Oregon Trail to the Oregon Territory, a location which was then receiving considerable attention in the contemporary press. This group met up with others seeking to pioneer in Oregon and a massive train of 114 animal-drawn wagons ensued. The party reached Oregon City in November 1847, where Whitcomb would remain for the rest of the year.

=== Establishment of Milwaukie ===
Early in 1848 Whitcomb made a donation land claim and made use of parts brought with him on the journey to establish a water-powered sawmill at the confluence of Johnson Creek with the Willamette River. On his claim he platted the town of Milwaukie in 1848.

In the summer of 1848 news that gold had been discovered in California made its way to the Willamette Valley and an exodus of fortune-seekers from Oregon ensued. Whitcomb decided that a surer path to fortune lay with the manufacture and supply of lumber to the boomtowns of Northern California, however, and he built a schooner, the Milwaukie, and bought a brig, the Forest, to carry lumber and other goods to markets in California. Whitcomb's mill turned out 6,000 board feet of rough 3-inch planks every day in two 12-hour shifts — material which brought $300 per thousand board feet in San Francisco, triple the prevailing price in Oregon.

Whitcomb's fortunes were further enhanced by a flood during the winter of 1849–50, in which many of his competitors in the lumber industry saw their mills washed away or badly damaged by floodwaters. Whitcomb similarly enriched himself with establishment of a flour mill, with which he was able to provide flour to miners at extremely profitable prices.

The milling and shipping business proved lucrative and other ships were added to Whitcomb's fleet, including the barks Louisville, Ocean Bird, and Keoka, all added by 1851. Whitcomb used some of his profits to launch a newspaper, the Western Star, based in Milwaukie. This paper would be moved to Portland In 1851 and its name changed to the Oregon Weekly Times.

=== Steamship operator ===
In the same year he started his newspaper, Whitcomb built his steamship, Lot Whitcomb. John C. Ainsworth captained the vessel, which was 160 feet (49 m) long and had side wheels that were 18 feet (5.5 m) in diameter. Jacob Kamm, who installed the steamship's machinery, was the engineer.

Whitcomb, in a Western Star editorial on November 21, 1850, promoted the steamboat, meant for "river navigation between Oregon City and Pacific City, touching at every point where there is business." After the ship was launched, it made regular trips between Oregon City and Astoria, at the mouth of the Columbia River. However, river shoals between Milwaukie and Portland made the latter more accessible to large vessels, and Portland soon won the competition for sea-going commerce.

Whitcomb sold the ship to an Oregon City group, which in turn sold it to the California Steam Navigation Company in 1853 for use on the Sacramento River.

=== Political career ===
Whitcomb's other activities included a term (1852–53) as Clackamas County representative to the House chamber of the Oregon Territorial Legislature. He served as postmaster at Milwaukie from 1851 through 1857.

=== Death and legacy ===
Lot Whitcomb died March 31, 1857. He was 49 years old at the time of his death.

After their deaths, Lot and Irene Whitcomb were buried in the private Whitcomb cemetery in Milwaukie but were later moved to River View Cemetery in Portland.

Lot Whitcomb Elementary School in Milwaukie is named after Whitcomb. In Oregon City, Lot Whitcomb Drive bears his name. Liberty Ship 1594, SS Lot Whitcomb, was also named after him.
