= Ainsworth, Washington =

Ghost town in Washington (state)

- Ghost town
- Franklin County, Washington

- Location within Washington (state) Location within the United States
- Coordinates: 46°13′01″N 119°01′37″W
- Country: United States
- State: Washington
- County: Franklin
- Platted: 1879
- Time zone: UTC-8 (Pacific (PST))
  - Summer (DST): UTC-7 (PDT)

Ainsworth, Washington, was a Franklin County, Washington town located on the northern bank of the mouth of the Snake River, in what is now Pasco, Washington.

== History ==
Ainsworth was built as a depot on the Northern Pacific Railroad, and named after John C. Ainsworth, president of the Oregon Steam Navigation Company. The town was platted in 1879. Thomas Symons, the US Army engineer at the site commented at the time,

Ainsworth is one of the most uncomfortable, abominable places in America to live in. You can scan the horizon in vain for a tree or anything resembling one. The heat through the summer is excessive, and high winds prevail and blow the sands about into everything. By the glare of the sun and the flying sands, one's eyes are in a constant state of winking, blinking, and torment, if nothing more serious results.

When Franklin County was created from Whitman County in 1883, Ainsworth served as the county seat. At the time, a number of Chinese laborers also lived in Ainsworth - many of whom worked for the railroad and operated local businesses.

In 1884, a railroad bridge across the Snake River was completed. By 1885, many of the buildings in Ainsworth were either dismantled or moved to Pasco. The Chinese laborers also moved to the new town, and established their own district, but most of them left when the railroad work was completed and the work let up. In 1885, the State Legislature officially moved the county seat to Pasco.

Over the years, Pasco increased in size and engulfed the original townsite.

1850		—
1860		—
1870		—
1880	8,000	
1890	450	
