= Ainsworth State Park =

State park in Oregon, United States

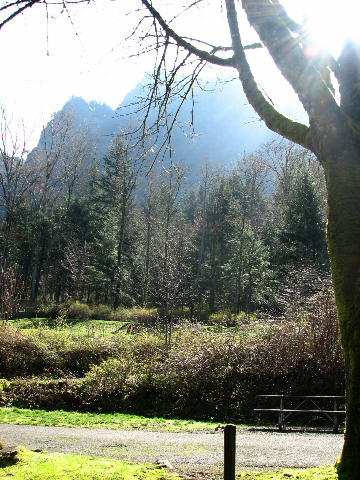
- Gorge cliffs above the Ainsworth campground

- Location within Oregon Location within the United States
- Type: Public, state
- Location: Multnomah County, Oregon
- Nearest city: Portland, Oregon, USA
- Coordinates: 45°35′32″N 122°03′25″W
- Operator: Oregon State Parks and Recreation

Ainsworth State Park is a state park in eastern Multnomah County, Oregon, United States near Cascade Locks. It is located in the Columbia River Gorge, adjacent to the Historic Columbia River Highway. The park, administered by the Oregon Parks and Recreation Department, offers a seasonal, full-service campground, access to Gorge hiking trails beyond park boundaries, and a day-use area.

Ainsworth State Park lies within the Columbia River Gorge National Scenic Area, and is 4 miles (6.4 km) from Multnomah Falls. It is named for John Churchill Ainsworth (1870–1943), a prominent Oregon businessman, Portland banker and chairman of the State Highway Commission from 1931 to 1932. He donated the land in 1933 that became the park and was a son of pioneer steam-boatman John Commingers Ainsworth.

== History ==
The park was affected by the Eagle Creek Fire, but damage was limited.

== Amenities ==
- Full RV hook-up sites
- Tent camp sites
- Flush toilets
- Showers
- RV dump station
- Picnic areas
- Amphitheater
- Playgrounds
- Park host

== See also ==
- List of Oregon state parks
