= Georgiana (steamboat) =

Former propeller-driven steamboat

- Georgiana in the 1920s on the Columbia River. The sternwheeler Lurline is visible to the rear.

History

United States
- Name: Georgiana
- Owner: Harkins Transportation Company (1914–1937); Ralph J. Staehli (1937–1940)
- Builder: Joseph Supple, Portland, Oregon
- Launched: June 20, 1914
- In service: 1914
- Out of service: 1940
- Renamed: Lake Bonneville, c.1937
- Identification: US 212280
- Fate: Abandoned

General characteristics
- Type: Passenger ship
- Tonnage: 242 gross; 198 registered
- Displacement: 242 long tons (246 t)
- Length: 145 ft (44 m)
- Beam: 22 ft 5 in (6.83 m)
- Propulsion: Steam engine

Georgiana was a propeller-driven steamboat that operated on the Columbia River from 1914 to 1940. Georgiana was built of wood, and specially designed for the Harkins Transportation Company, a steamboat line in which the wealthy Henry L. Pittock was a shareholder.

== Construction and launching ==
Georgiana was built at Joseph Supple's yard in Portland, Oregon just as railroads and highways would end the days of steamboats on the Columbia river and all other inland waterways of the Pacific Northwest. Her name honored three women, Georgiana Pittock, wife of Henry L., and her granddaughters, Georgiana Leadbetter and Georgiana Gantenbein. L.O. (Lyle Owen) Hosford was the first captain of Georgiana, and his sister Cora christened the vessel at her launching on June 20, 1914.

Georgiana was small (242 tons displacement, 145' length, 22.5' beam) compared to some of the other ships that ran on the river in those days, such as the aging T.J. Potter and the magnificent (and recently rebuilt) Bailey Gatzert. Those larger boats had reached the end of their time, as river travel declined in popularity. Georgiana was considered a "day boat" on which passengers were encouraged to carry their own lunch. Still she was popular with passengers and her fare of one dollar for the Portland to Astoria run was cheaper than the railway.

== Operations on Columbia River ==
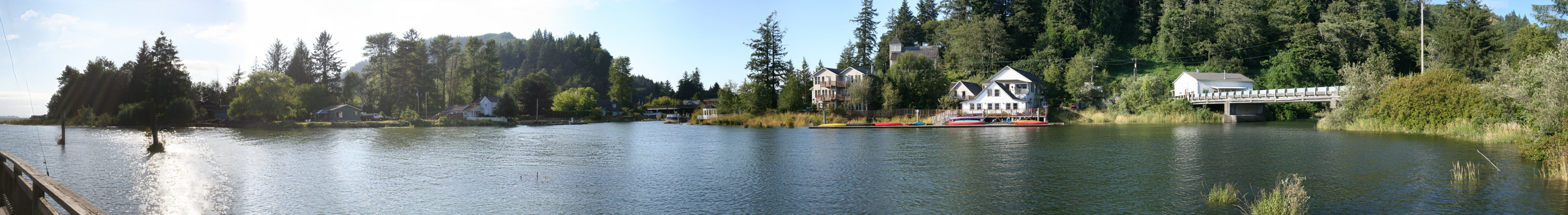
Skamokawa, Washington, once a town accessible only by water, and served by Georgiana

Georgiana was considered to be a fast boat, and in 1920, made the 110 mile Portland-Astoria run in five hours and forty-five minutes, with five landings. Her principal competitor in the early 1920s was a similarly designed steam propeller Astorian (ex Nisqually), built in 1911 to serve the Tacoma-Olympia route, and brought around to the Columbia River in 1918. The big paddle-wheelers had all disappeared by then, but the smaller Georgiana and Astorian continued to service the small towns along the Columbia that had no road or rail access, like Cathlamet, Pillar Rock, Eureka, Skamokawa, and Brookfield, often racing each other on the same schedule between Portland and Astoria.

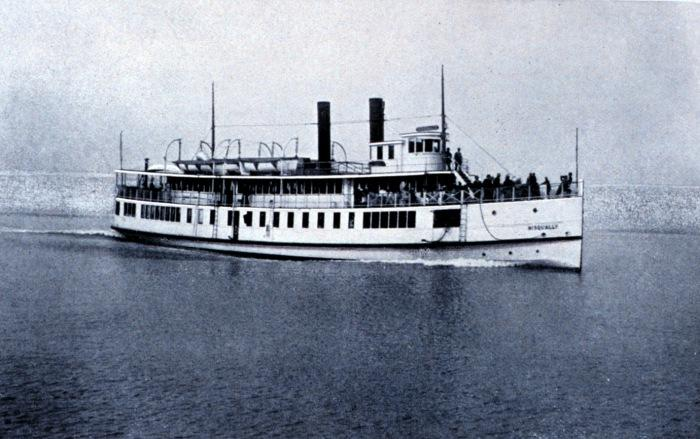
Astorian (as Nisqually) 1912, similar boat to Georgiana, and competitor 1918–1921 on Columbia River

In 1921, Astorian broke her shaft at full speed, sustaining serious damage which took her out of service until she was returned to Puget Sound for repair. This left Georgiana and the other Harkins Transportation Company boats (Undine, Lurline, and Madeline (ex Joseph Kellogg) as the only major steamboats on the Columbia River, although Iralda, a lighter steam propeller, was placed on the Astoria run in 1921 to compete with Georgiana. From 1918 to 1932, Georgiana's captain was John L. Starr, who logged over 650,000 miles on board.

== Late revival of business ==
In 1935, Portland businessman Ralph J. Staehli organized a small revival of the steamboat business, buying the old sternwheeler Cascades of the Columbia from Shaver Transportation Company and organizing weekend excursions from Portland up the Columbia to the construction site of the Bonneville Dam. Tickets were $1.00 per person, and the trip was so successful that the next summer, 1936, Staehli was able to buy the old sternwheeler Northwestern which he likewise filled to capacity each weekend. In 1937 Staehli bought Georgiana (Harkins Transportation had gone bankrupt in that year).

== Last route and abandonment ==
When Bonneville Dam was complete, and the tamed river filled into a lake, Staehli took Georgiana off the lower river, renamed her Lake Bonneville, and used her on excursions from Portland to The Dalles on the lake through the new lock at the dam. The Second World War ended the excursion business, and Georgiana ended up abandoned near Post Office Bar on Sauvie Island and her hull sank into the sand.

== Legacy ==
Georgiana was one of the last steamboats on the historic Portland-Astoria run. Her last captain on the run was Arthur H. Riggs, (1870–1941) whose own life spanned the great days of steamboating on the Columbia and Willamette rivers. Captain Riggs had begun in steamboating in 1887 on the Isabel on the Willamette and Yamhill rivers, and later served on many famous boats throughout the Pacific Northwest, including Multnomah, Telegraph and Telephone. Georgiana had been an interim boat between the flamboyant old paddlewheelers and the modern steel excursion boats, and her trade might have continued had it not been disrupted by World War II.

== See also ==
- Steamboats of the Columbia River
