= Harkins Transportation Company =

Harkins Transportation Company was founded in 1914 by L.P.(Lovelace Perne) Hosford, Henry L. Pittock, and A.J. Lewthwaite. The line was named after the tugboat Jessie Harkins, which had been built by Jacob Kamm and named after Hosford's niece. The line ran steamboats on the lower Columbia from 1914 to 1937, when it was forced into bankruptcy. Steamboats owned by the company included Georgiana, Lurline, Undine, and Madeline (ex Joseph Kellogg). In 1931, the company built the diesel propeller tug L.P. Hosford, using upper works salvaged from the Lurline.

== See also ==
- Georgiana
- Lurline
