= Jacob Kamm =

American businessman (1823 – 1912)

Jacob Kamm

Jacob Kamm (12 December 1823 – 16 December 1912) was a prominent early transportation businessman in Oregon, USA.

== Early life ==
Kamm was born on 12 December 1823, in Canton of Glarus, Switzerland. His family migrated to America when he was 8 to Illinois, St. Louis and then New Orleans. He worked as a printer's devil beginning at age 12. A story repeated after Kamm's death was that a thief stole $12 from him in 1837, leading Kamm to work on a Mississippi steamer, the Ark, as a cabin boy. Trained as an engineer on the Mississippi River, he was certified chief engineer with the St. Louis Association of Steamboat Engineers at age 25. In 1849, he moved west with the California Gold Rush, piloting the Blackhawk, a steamer, on the Sacramento River.

== Oregon ==
Kamm moved to Oregon in 1850 after being hired by the Milwaukie, Oregon founder Lot Whitcomb onto his ship, The Lot Whitcomb, being the chief engineer on the Willamette River. The Lot Whitcomb was launched on 25 December 1850. Kamm and John C. Ainsworth joined with Abernathy and Clark, merchants from Oregon City, in 1854 or 1855 to build the Jenny Clark, a sternwheeler on the Willamette. Kamm owned half of the Jenny Clark, Ainsworth owned a quarter, and Abernathy and Clark shared the remaining quarter. They then built the Carrie Ladd steamer in 1858, called the "keystone of the Oregon Steam Navigation Company".

He was a founder of the Oregon Steam Navigation Company in 1879 and a shareholder in the Ilwaco Railway and Navigation Company. He built steamboats including in 1891, the Ocean Wave and in 1900, Athlon. One of the companies he owned was the Vancouver Transportation Company.

Kamm sold property to the city in about 1910 to construct Old Lincoln High School, currently known as Portland State University's Lincoln Hall. His 1870s French Second Empire style home, the Jacob Kamm House was moved from its 14th and Main location in the 1950s to construct the current Lincoln High School. This estate near 14th and Main contained 11 acres (45,000 m^{2}).

== Personal life ==
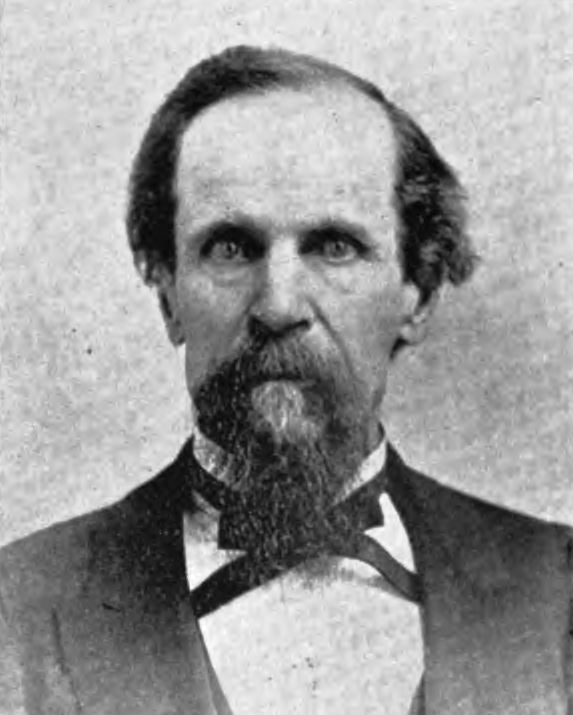

Kamm married Caroline Augusta Gray on 13 September 1859 during the Pig War, on the PS Eliza Anderson steamer just outside Fort Hope, Canada. They had one son, Charles Tilton Kamm (1860–1906). Kamm was a Mason, being inducted at age 21 in St. Louis. In Portland, he was affiliated with the Multnomah Lodge in Oregon City, then the Willamette Lodge in Portland. He was also a Knights Templar and a Shriner.

Caroline Augusta Gray was born on 16 October 1840 at Camp Lapwai, outside Lewiston, Idaho. Her father was William H. Gray. She died in 1932.

== Late life and death ==
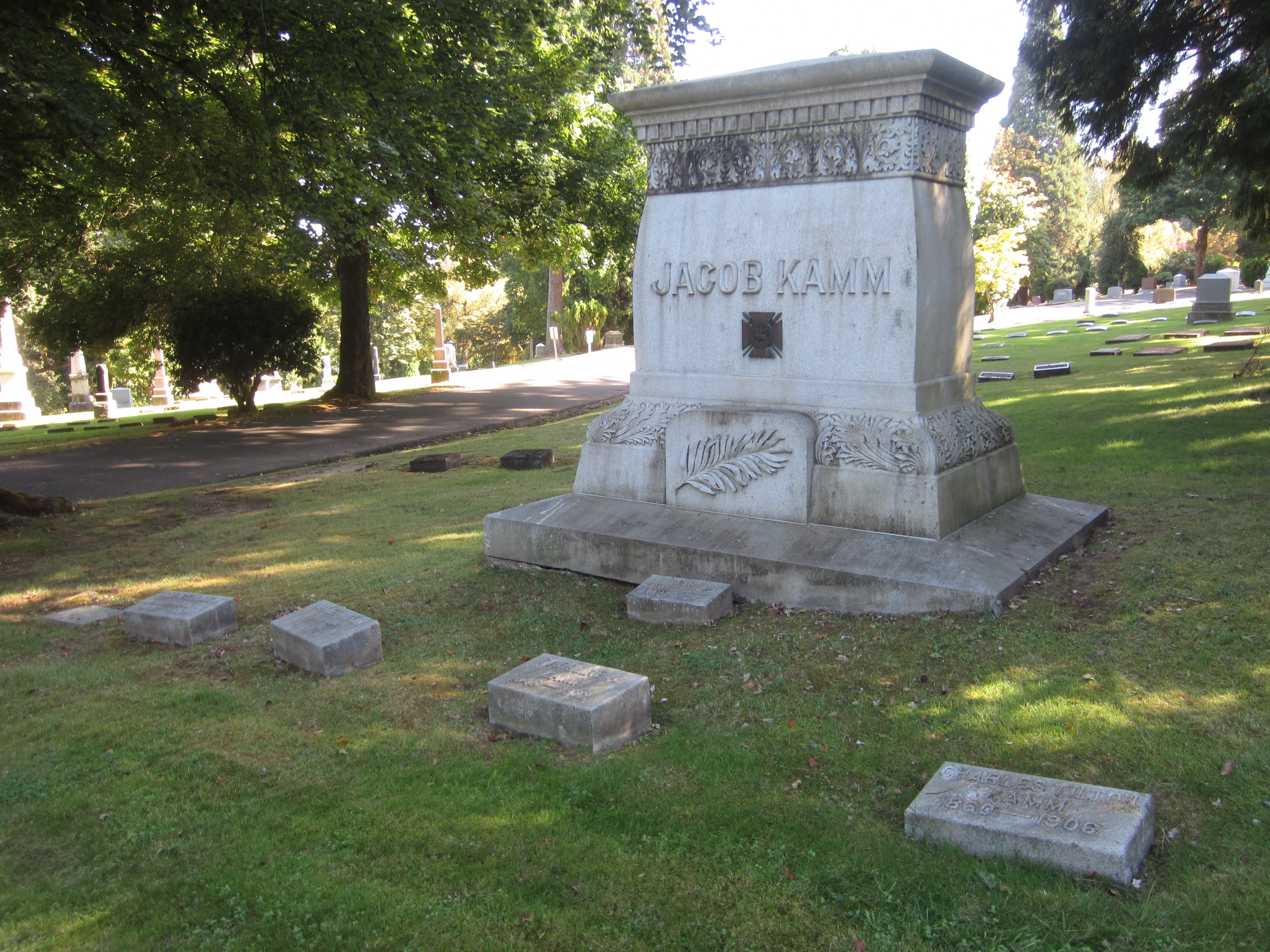
Kamm's grave at River View Cemetery, in Portland

In December 1907, Kamm was "run down by a reckless bicycle rider" in Portland. Another report described the bicyclist as a "careless boy bicyclist"; Kamm was confined to his bed for many days.

Kamm became ill on 1 December 1912, "being an invalid" since the 1907 bicycle wreck. By December 13, The Oregonian reported he "may only live a few hours", stating his condition was "sinking rapidly". The following day, he entered a coma and died. He was buried at the River View Cemetery in Portland.

At time of death, his estate was valued at approximately $4 million. Aside from the Jacob Kamm home and property, he also owned a half-block building at Front and Pine, a quarter block at Third and Yamhill, a quarter block at First and Washington, the Vancouver Transportation Company, was a "heavy stockholder" in the First National Bank of Astoria, and a "heavy stockholder" in the First National Bank of Portland. He also owned valuable property on Market Street in San Francisco. At the time of his death, the Vancouver Transportation Company operated two ships: the Lurline and Undine on routes between Portland and Astoria.

In 1929, E.W. Wright, a marine historian, wrote that Kamm was one of "two outstanding figures whose leadership in Columbia river steamboating will never be disputed".
