= John C. Ainsworth =

American Businessman

John Commingers Ainsworth
- Born: June 6, 1822; Springboro, Ohio
- Died: December 30, 1893 (aged 71) near Oakland, California
- Occupations: businessman and steamboat owner
- Known for: founded Oregon Steam Navigation Company

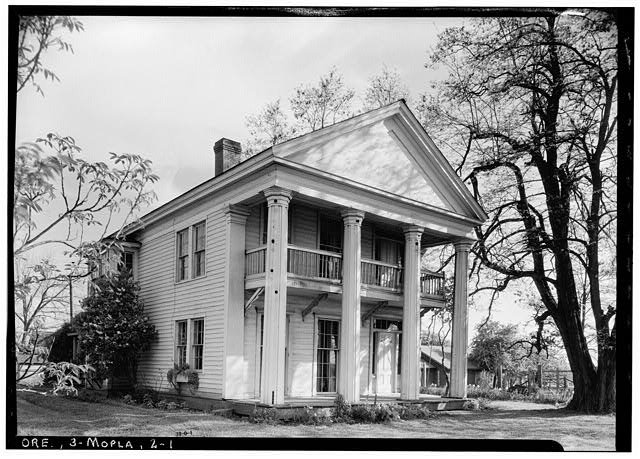
John C. Ainsworth house in Oregon City

John Commingers Ainsworth (June 6, 1822 – December 30, 1893) was an American pioneer businessman and steamboat owner in Oregon. A native of Ohio, he moved west to mine gold in California before immigrating to Oregon where he piloted steamships and became a founder of the Oregon Steam Navigation Company and several banks.

== Early life ==
Ainsworth was born in Springboro, Ohio, on June 6, 1822. His parents died while he was 13 years old, so he went to work for his uncle in Farmington, Iowa. They became partners in a business selling goods from boats along the Ohio River, but soon he split from his uncle and bought a store with a partner, which was sold at a good profit after only one year. He married a young woman, Josephine Augusta Kendall, who died fifteen months later.

== American West ==
Ainsworth was not done partnering with his uncle. In 1844 they bought a steamboat and started a successful packet delivery service along the upper Mississippi River. Then the Gold Rush hit in 1849, and he sold his share of the business to go to California. The Gold Rush did not live up to his expectations, so he found a job piloting a steamer on the Willamette River in Oregon.

In 1851, he married the daughter of Judge S.S. White, and built a house in Oregon City. In late 1860, Ainsworth and several investors started the Oregon Steam Navigation Company (OSNC). The OSNC controlled the shipping routes of steamers, railroads, and freight lines in Washington and Oregon.

In 1868, Ainsworth had an annual income of $14,651, one of the highest in the state of Oregon.

By 1869, the OSNC monopolized the Columbia River transportation market. In April 1879, Henry Villard purchased the OSNC for its full value of $5 million. Ainsworth retired to Oakland, California, after the sale.

== Later years and family ==
Ainsworth served on the Portland Public Schools board from 1873 to 1879.

After selling out, he entered the banking business in 1883 with the Ainsworth National Bank in Portland. In 1892, he started the Central Bank of Oakland. Ainsworth had seven children: George (with his second wife Nancy White) and John, Harry, Daisy, Laura, Maud, and Belle (with his third wife Sarah Frances "Fanny" Babbitt). Ainsworth was a Freemason, and eventually the third Grand Master of the Grand Lodge of Oregon. In 1870, Ainsworth founded the Orient of Oregon and the Valley of Portland of the Ancient and Accepted Scottish Rite, S.J. and served as the first Sovereign Grand Inspector General of the Orient of Oregon. After retiring to California he wrote his autobiography. He died near Oakland, California, on December 30, 1893.

He is the namesake of Ainsworth, Washington, as well as Ainsworth Elementary School in SW Portland. His son, John Churchill Ainsworth, (1870–1943) was a prominent Oregon businessman, Portland banker and served as chairman of the State Highway Commission from 1931 to 1932. John Churchill also donated the land in 1933 that became Ainsworth State Park.

== See also ==
- Capt. John C. Ainsworth House
