= Mountain Gem =

American steamboat

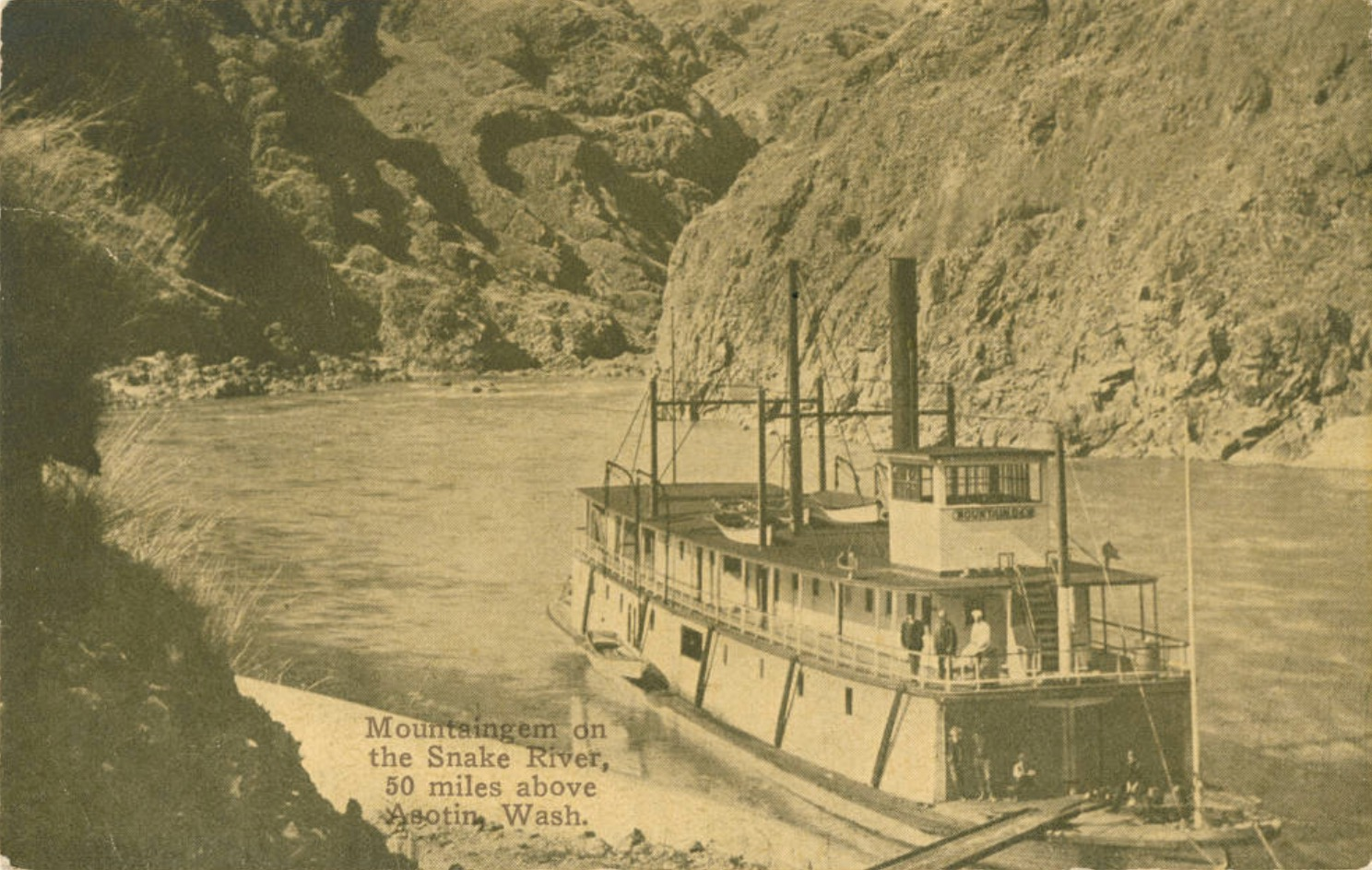
- Mountain Gem at Eureka Bar, on the Snake River, circa 1906.

History
- Name: Mountain Gem
- In service: 1904
- Out of service: 1912
- Identification: U.S. #201045
- Fate: Abandoned 1924
- Notes: Machinery to Grahamona in 1912.

General characteristics
- Type: Riverine all-purpose
- Tonnage: 469 GT; 282 NT
- Length: 150 ft (45.72 m)
- Beam: 26.5 ft (8.08 m)
- Depth: 5 ft (1.52 m) depth of hold
- Installed power: twin steam engines, horizontally mounted, each with bore of 13 in (33.0 cm) and stroke of 72 in (1.83 m)
- Propulsion: stern-wheel
- Speed: 19 miles per hour
- Capacity: 200 passengers (day excursions); 75 overnight

Mountain Gem was a sternwheel-driven steamboat that operated on the Snake and Columbia rivers from 1904 to 1912, when the machinery was removed and installed in a different, newly built steamboat. Mountain Gem remained on the U.S. merchant vessel registry until 1922 or later. Although Mountain Gem was not abandoned until 1924, there is no evidence it was used after 1912.

== Construction ==
Mountain Gem was built for the Lewiston Navigation company. Experienced steamboat captain Henry C. Baughman supervised construction.

According to one report, the steamer cost $35,000 to construct. Mountain Gem was leased to C.F. Allen, a businessman of Clarkston, Washington.

Mountain Gem was built with funds raised by a public stock subscription which raised $10,000 to build a new steamer for work on the upper Snake River to replace the wrecked Imnaha. Imnaha had been serving mines in the Eureka area upriver from Lewiston. When Imnaha was wrecked, the mine owners went to the public and asked them to raise money for a new steamer.

Mountain Gem was built in Lewiston, Idaho, in 1904.

== Specifications ==
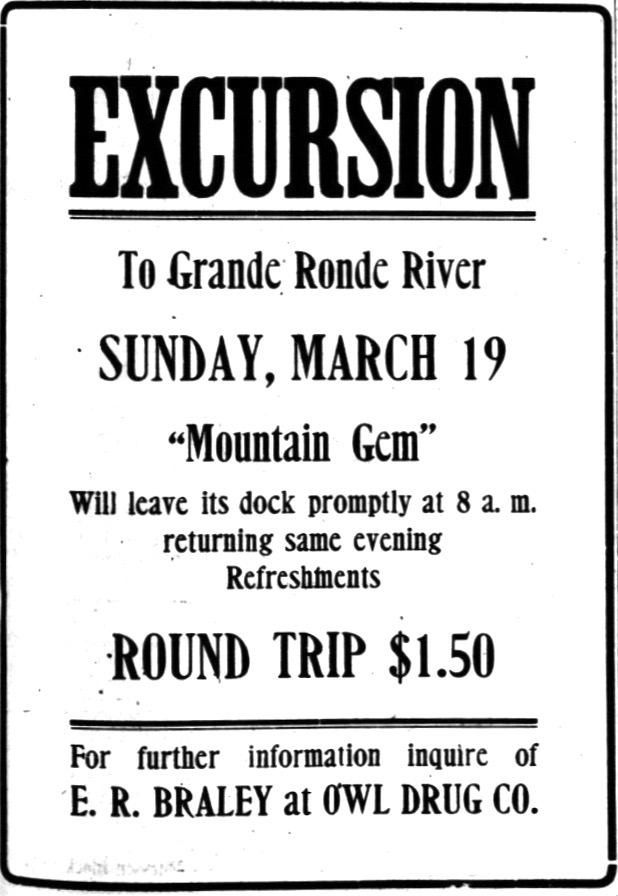
Advertisement, placed March 10, 1905, for an excursion on Mountain Gem, from Lewiston, Idaho, to the Grande Ronde River.

Mountain Gem was 150 ft (45.72 m) long over the hull, exclusive of the fantail, which was the extension over the stern on which the stern-wheel was mounted. The steamer had a beam 26.5 ft (8.08 m) measured over the hull exclusive of long protective timbers, called guards, along the upper outside edge of the hull. The depth of hold was 5 ft (1.52 m) feet. To minimize the chance of sinking in the many rapids of the Snake River, the hull was divided into 29 water-tight compartments.

Overall size of the steamer was 469 gross tons and 282 net tons, with tons being a measure of volume and not weight. The merchant vessel registry number was 201045. On day excursions, Mountain Gem could carry 200 passengers. The steamer had overnight accommodations for 75 passengers.

== Engineering ==
Mountain Gem was driven by twin steam engines, horizontally mounted, each with a bore of 13 in (33.0 cm) and stroke of 72 in (1.83 m) turning a stern-wheel. Mountain Gem could reach a speed of 19 miles an hour. The boilers were licensed to carry 225 pounds of steam. The boat carried rotary cut-off engines. The machinery was designed by engineer F.L. Campbell, and was manufactured by the Willamette Iron Works of Portland.

== Financing problems ==
Before construction of Mountain Gem was complete, mining activity had fallen off sharply. As a result, Mountain Gem had been leased out, with an additional $10,000 expended to complete the steamer for the leaseholder, the money being raised by obtaining a loan secured by a mortgage on the steamer. The Eureka Mining company advanced the $10,000 necessary to complete the boat. The mortgage was foreclosed and the steamer was sold for $13,200 to satisfy the debt.

== Early career ==
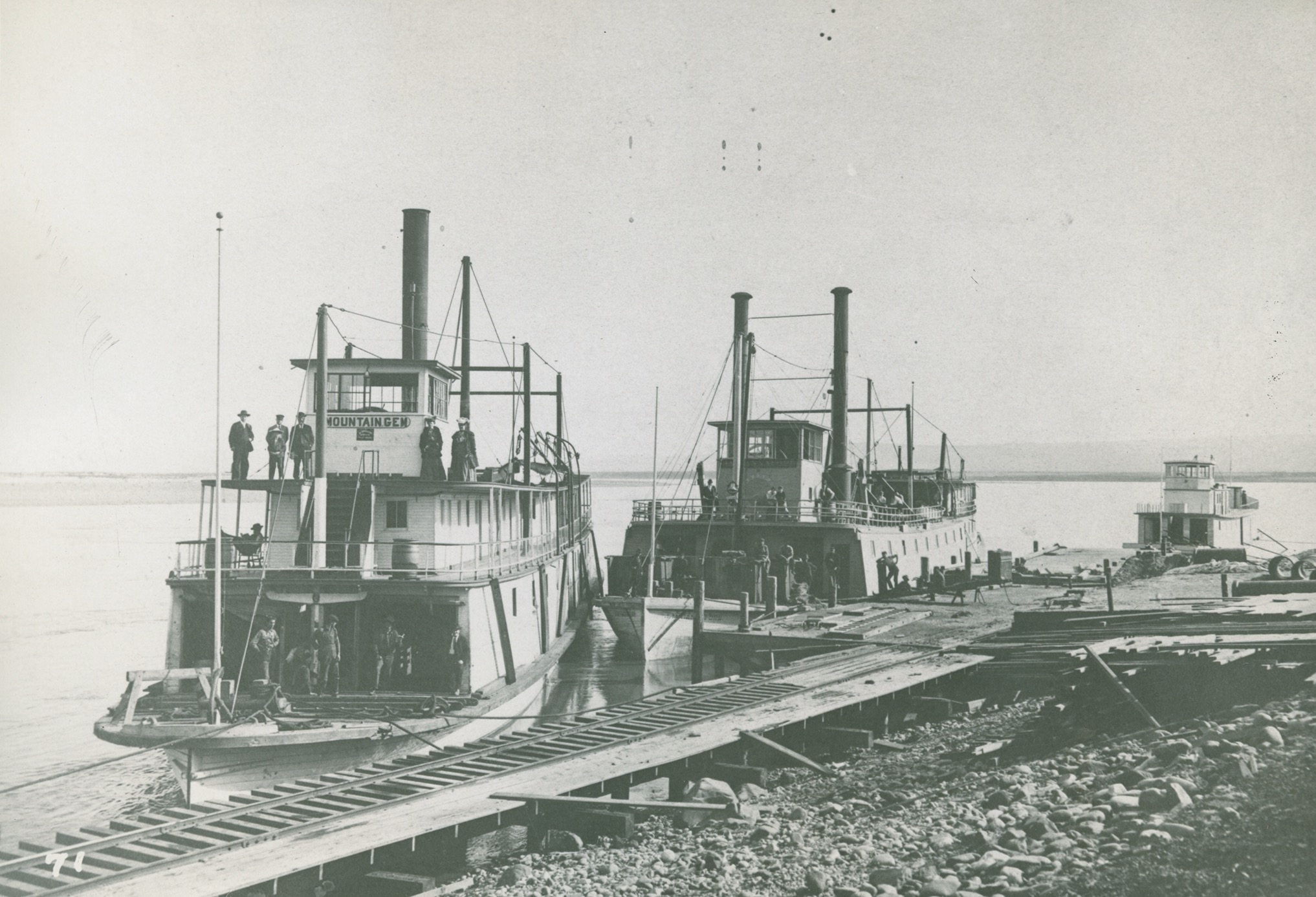
Mountain Gem (left) and two other steamers at Asotin, Washington, 1906

In mid-October 1904, Captain William P. Gray took Mountain Gem upriver from Lewiston. Originally it had been intended to take the steamer as far as the Wild Goose Rapids, but river conditions prevented the boat from going farther than Grand Ronde. Recent heavy storms had caused landslides into the river, creating additional rapids.

The plan at that time for the steamer's use was to run from Lewiston in the morning to Asotin, Washington, and returning in the afternoon, carrying passengers for a fair at Lewiston, at 60 cents each for the round trip.

The distance between Lewiston and the upriver mining district was 52 miles. Despite Mountain Gem’s speed of 19 miles an hour, it took nine hours to cover the distance. At two separate points the current was 12 miles an hour, and it was often necessary to line through these places.

== Damaged at Umatilla Rapids ==
By January 1906, Mountain Gem had been brought down the Snake River, to be operated by the Open-River Commission on the Columbia run between Celilo, Oregon and Wallula, Washington. On the morning of January 11, 1906 Mountain Gem sustained serious damage while running downstream through Umatilla Rapids, which were located two miles east of Umatilla, Oregon. The steamer first hit one set of rocks, and became stranded. After being towed off with cables, the boat lacked sufficient power to move on its own, and so the decision was made to let it drift downstream, with the hope it would make it safely.

This proved not to be the case, as the steamer then struck another rock and received even worse damage, the wheel was broken, and the hull pierced in several places. Only the water-tight compartments prevented the vessel from sinking. Repairs were completed on February 20, 1906, and Mountain Gem returned to service, making two trips weekly between Wallula and Celilo.

== Later service ==
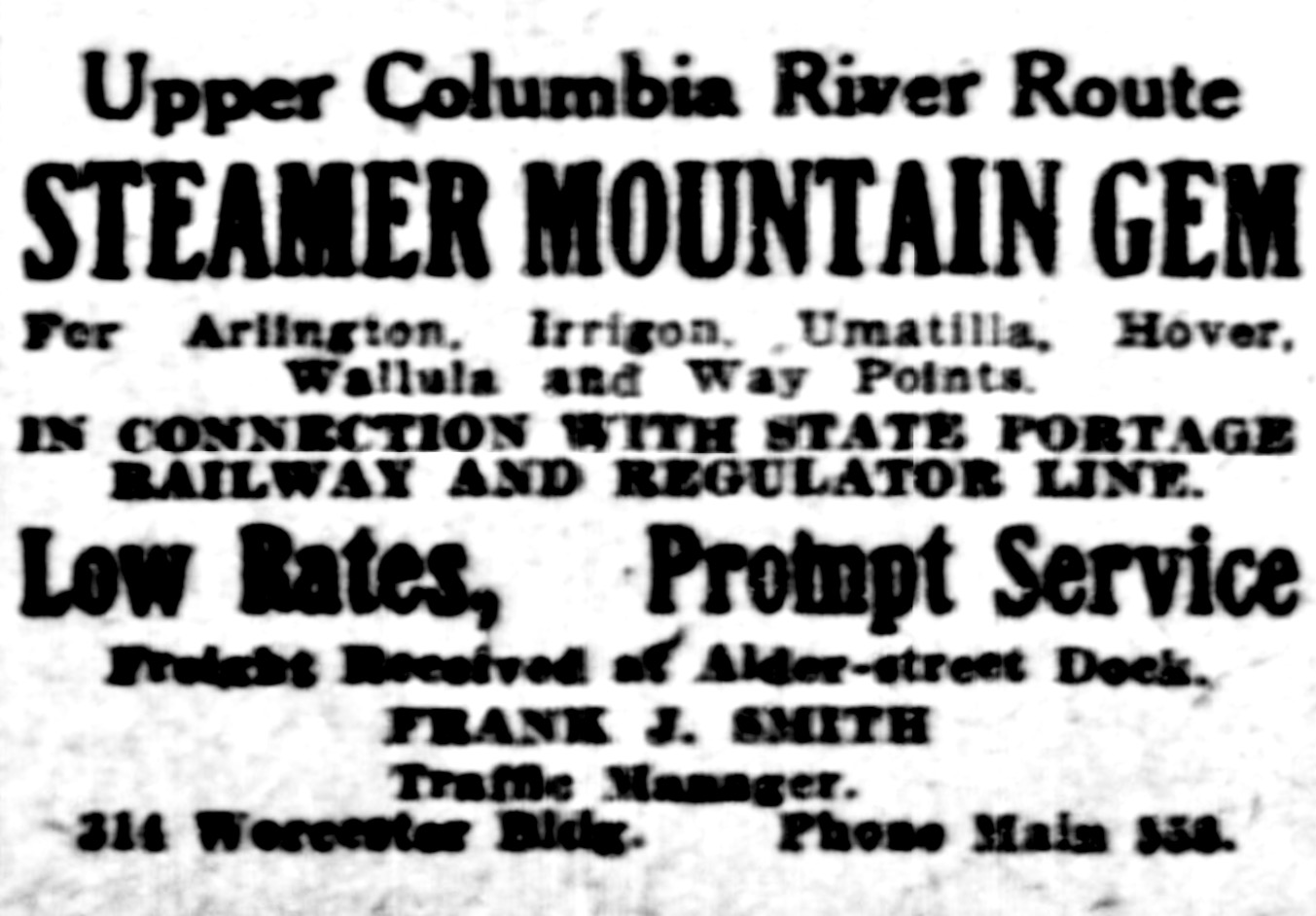
Advertisement for steamboat service by Mountain Gem, on the upper Columbia River. Placed in the Morning Oregonian on April 9, 1906.

In early April 1906, Frank J. Smith, transportation manager for Mountain Gem, reported that the steamer's route had been extended to Kennewick and Pasco, Washington, both on the Columbia River, upstream from Wallula. These two towns had never before had steamboat service. Mountain Gem would also connect with the White Bluffs Transportation Company which ran to Priest Rapids on the upper Columbia. In October 1906, Mountain Gem was the largest steamboat on the upper Columbia, and carried wheat from Hover, Washington, to Celilo, a distance of 115 miles.

In late July 1908, Mountain Gem was temporarily aid up, and its business was consolidated with the steamer W.R. Todd, with the Todd alone left on the Kennewick-Priest Rapids route.

== Machinery removed ==
In early February 1912 Mountain Gem was sold to the Yellow Stack Line, which between Portland and Oregon City on the Willamette River The Yellow Stack Line planned to strip the machinery out of Mountain Gem and use it to build a new steamer, and selling the hull and cabin structure to a broker. By February 14, one of three train carloads of machinery had arrived in Portland, from Kennewick, where Mountain Gem was being stripped. The new steamer which would receive Mountain Gem’s machinery was the Grahamona.

== Officers and crew ==
Captains of Mountain Gem included William Polk Gray and John Akins.

== Disposition ==
Mountain Gem was reported to have been abandoned in 1924. The steamer was carried on the Merchant Vessel Registry as late as 1922. There does not appear to be any record of the steamer having been used after 1912, nor of it having new machinery installed.
