= Grahamona =

1912 steamboat in United States

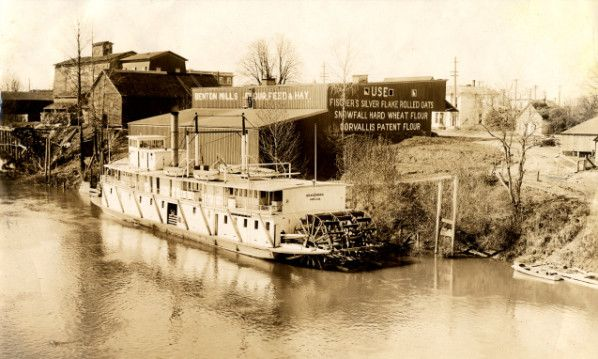
- Grahamona at Corvallis, Oregon, sometime between 1912 and 1918.

History
- Name: Grahamona; renamed Northwestern in 1920
- Owner: Oregon City Transportation Co.; Inland Empire Truck & Boat Co.; Portland Navigation Co.; Salem Navigation Co. Alaska Rivers Navigation Co.
- Route: Willamette, Columbia, and Snake rivers; Kuskokwim River.
- Builder: Joseph Supple
- Cost: $35,000 with fittings
- Completed: 1912, at Portland, Oregon
- Out of service: 1949
- Identification: U.S. Steamboat registry #210453
- Fate: Abandoned on riverbank near McGrath, Alaska

General characteristics
- Class & type: Riverine passenger/freight
- Tonnage: 443 gross; 413 net tonnage.
- Length: 149.5 ft (45.6 m) measured over hull.
- Beam: 30 ft 0 in (9.1 m) measured over hull.
- Draft: 3 ft 0 in (0.9 m) when fully loaded with 300 tons cargo; 18 in (457.2 mm) with no cargo
- Depth: 4.5 ft 0 in (1.37 m)
- Installed power: twin steam engines, horizontally mounted; 700 indicated horsepower, each with a bore of 13 in (330.2 mm) and stroke of 6 ft (1.83 m)
- Propulsion: sternwheel originally 17.2 ft (5.2 m) in diameter
- Speed: 15 miles per hour
- Capacity: Licensed for 308 passengers in regular service; 412 on excursions; reported to have carried 800 persons once; 300 ton cargo capacity.
- Crew: 12 with accommodations for 30.

Grahamona was a sternwheel steamboat built in 1912 for the Oregon City Transportation Company, commonly known as the Yellow Stack Line. Grahamona was specially designed to serve on the shallow waters of the upper Willamette River. It was one of the largest steamboats ever to operate on the upper Willamette. In 1920, Grahamona was sold and the name was changed to Northwestern. In 1939, the vessel was sold again, and transferred to Alaska for service on the Kuskokwim River.

== Construction ==
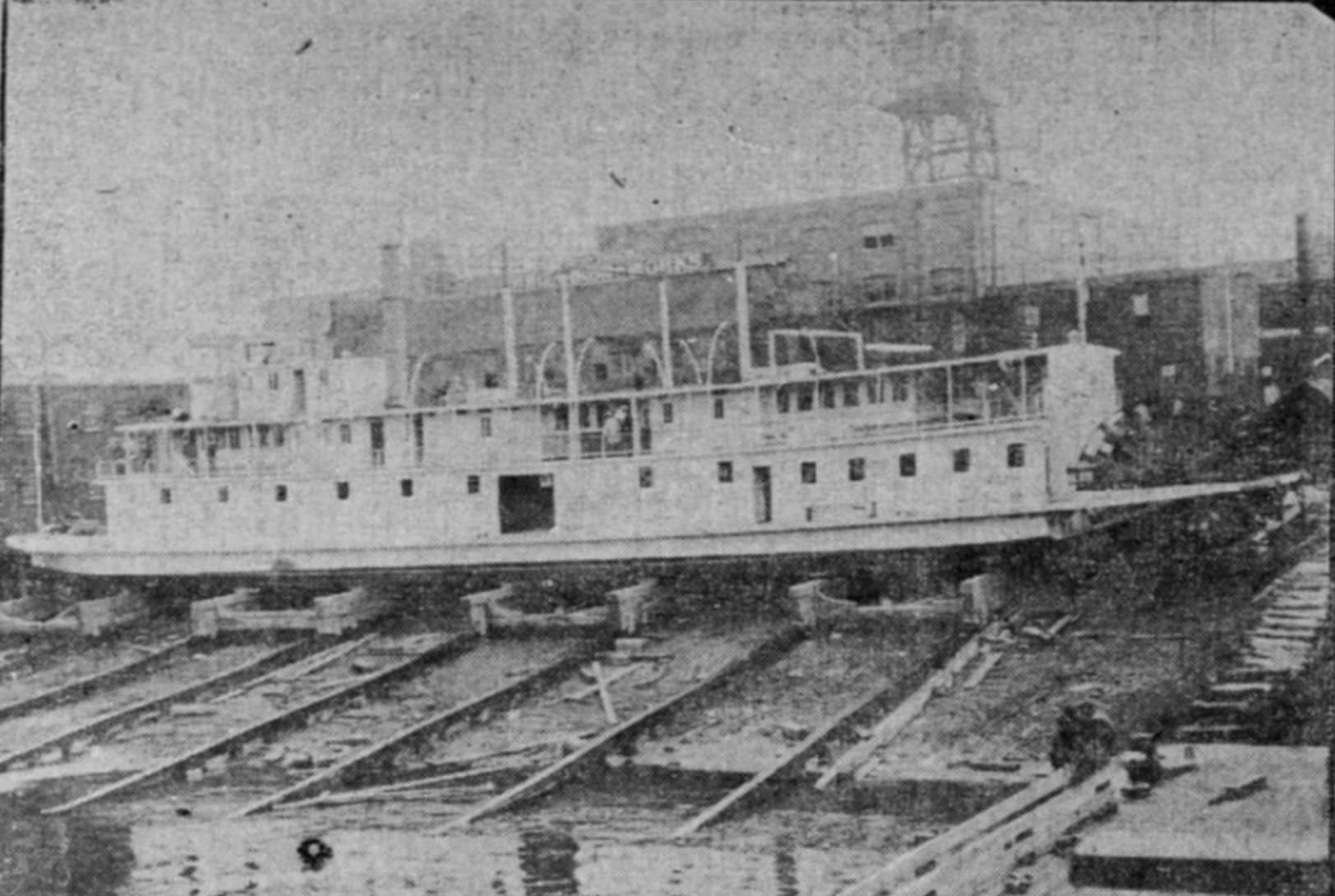
Grahamona under construction in 1912.

Grahamona was built for the Oregon City Transportation Company (O.C.T.C.) at the Joseph Supple yard on the Willamette River in Portland, Oregon. The Graham brothers were the sole owners of O.C.T.C. Originally the vessel was to be named Graemona, but it was changed to Grahamona on May 1, 1912. The O.C.T.C. was commonly referred to as the Yellow Stack Line. The names of all of the steamers of the Yellow Stack Line ended with -ona.

As of May 3, 1912, drafting work was underway for the new boat. Materials for the boat were ordered from the concern of Inman-Poulsen. By June 30, 1912, the lower part of the cabin structure (called the "house") was complete, and work was progressing on the upper house.

As launch day approached, Capt. Arthur W. Graham, one of the principals of O.C.T.C., announced that there would be no refreshments, commonly known as a "keg of nails" distributed to guests at the launching of the Grahamona. Graham actually would have preferred to have no public announcement of the launching at all. Some people were calling the new boat the Grandmother.

The launch was scheduled for 2:00 p.m. on Wednesday, September 4, 1912. The launch was made on time, without any christening or other ceremony. The launch was effected without problem, and the boat slid smoothly into the water.

== Dimensions, design, engineering and cost ==
=== Dimensions ===
The official registry dimensions for Grahamona were length, measured over the hull, 149.5 ft (45.6 m); beam, again measured over the hull, 30 ft (9.1 m) measured over hull, and depth of hold, 6.1 ft (1.9 m). Measurements over the hull did not necessary reflect the full length of the vessel, for example the extension of the main deck over the stern to mount the paddle wheel was not included in the hull length measurement. The overall size of the vessel was measured in tonnage or tons, which for this purpose was a unit of volume and not of weight. Grahamona was 443 gross tons and 413 net tons.

=== Design ===
Grahamona was built to run on the Willamette River in conjunction with another O.C.T.C. boat, the Pomona. Grahamona and Pomona would work to provide daily passenger steamboat service between Portland, Albany and Corvallis. According to a contemporaneous newspaper report, Grahamona included accommodations for 30 crew. The official U.S. steamboat registry listed the number of crew as 12. The official registry number was 210453.

Grahamona was reported to be introducing a number of design innovations, including white enameled bunks and walls in the crew's quarters, a combination dressing table and life-preserver receptacle in the woman's cabin, and lockers in each officer's stateroom. The walls, the ceiling and the cabin exterior were all built of kiln-dried cedar for lightness of weight. Grahamona was said to have been "the best boat in every way that has been placed on the upper river run" and "fitted in every way as a high class river boat." The boat was 150 feet long, 30-foot beam and 4.6 depth of hold. According to one source, Grahamona could carry 443 passengers. According to another source, the steamer' was licensed to carry 308 passengers on a regular basis, and 412 on excursions. Grahamona could carry 300 tons of cargo while drawing only 3 feet of water. Draft light (carrying no cargo) was 18 inches.

=== Engineering ===
Grahamona was driven by two twin horizontally mounted steam engines turning a sternwheel that was 17.2 in diameter and 18 feet wide. Each steam engine had a single-cylinder, with each with a bore of 13 in (330.2 mm) and stroke of 6 ft (1.83 m). The engines and boiler developed 700 indicated horsepower. The engines and wheel were estimated to be able to propel the vessel at a speed of 15 miles per hour.

=== Cost ===
Grahamona cost about $28,000 to build without fittings. With fittings the cost was about $35,000.

== Placed into service ==
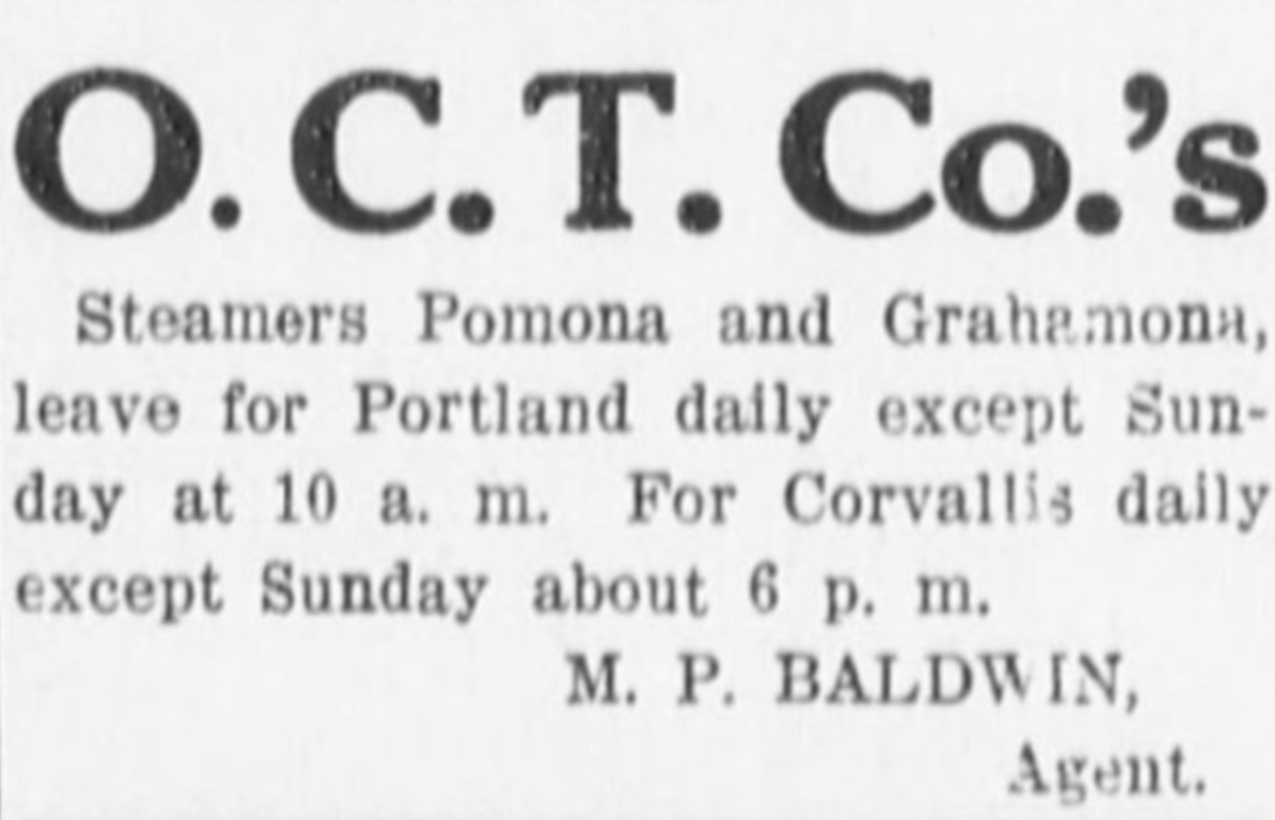
Advertisement for run to Corvallis, January 2, 1913.

Grahamona was scheduled to begin service running between Portland and Dayton, on the Yamhill River, on September 20, 1912. Service in fact began on Monday, September 24, 1912. The water level in the Willamette was then too low to permit Grahamona to reach Corvallis, so the Portland-Dayton route was selected instead.

Pomona was to be withdrawn for maintenance work once Grahamona was placed in service. The work on Pomona was done at the Supple yard.

Capt. Arthur W. Graham was to be the first master of Grahamona, but the permanent captain was intended to be Clyde Rabbe.

=== First run to Salem ===
On Thursday, October 24, 1912, the Willamette had risen sufficiently for Grahamona to make its first trip to Salem, Oregon, calling at the O.C.T.C's dock at the foot of Trade Street. The first run to Salem was to be an excursion for businessmen, with the regular run starting Friday, October 25, 1912.

The following Sunday, October 27, 1912, Grahamona took 200 Salem residents on an excursion from Salem south to Lincoln, a small settlement and steamboat landing about 6 miles south of Salem. The local newspaper praised Grahamona and urged residents of Salem to patronize the steamer.

=== First run to Corvallis ===
On Saturday, November 9, 1912, Grahamona was scheduled to depart Portland, from the O.C.T.C's dock at the foot of Taylor Street, for its first trip to Corvallis. Grahamona arrived in Albany for the first time at 3:00 a.m. on Tuesday, November 1912, and proceeded upstream to Corvallis later the same morning. O.C.T.C. planned to have one steamboat, either the Grahamona or the Pomona depart downstream from Corvallis each day, while another departed upstream from Portland, so that there would be daily service each day in both directions.

The Oregona would be placed on the run between Dayton, on the Yamhill River and Portland, which would relieve Pomona and Grahamona from having to make stops at landings between Portland and St. Paul. T.E. Coleman was appointed the O.C.T.C.’s agent in Albany, south of Salem, and he opened up an office and the dock to handle winter traffic for the company.

=== Problems on the Corvallis run ===
Service to Corvallis required a sufficient level of water in the river. As of December 4, 1912, with recent rainfall the river was 4 feet above low water level, considered, by M.P. Baldwin, of O.C.T.C., to be insufficient to allow Grahamona to proceed further upstream than Salem.

As a result, only one boat, Pomona, was running all the way from Portland to Corvallis. Grahamona went only as far as Salem. Oregona ran from Salem to Corvallis.

By December 17, 1912, the river had deepened sufficiently. Following a one-day delay caused by a mechanical failure, the company was able to put Grahamona on the full Portland-Corvallis run. As of January 2, 1913, the company was advertising regular daily service on the Portland-Corvallis route.

However, business in Corvallis soon proved to be insufficient to justify daily steamer service. On January 16, 1913, O.C.T.C. withdrew Pomona from the Portland-Corvallis run, leaving Grahamona alone on the route, making tri-weekly trips.

At the same time, the company withdrew Oregona from all service, temporarily as it turned out, and assigned Pomona to the Portland-Salem run, serving the city of Dayton, in Yamhill County, on the return trip to Salem. The company's recent decision to construct a third, and expensive boat, the Grahamona, appeared not be supported by sufficient business.

On December 26, 1913, the steamer Oregona collided with the anchored barge Champoeg 12 miles upriver from Portland, causing a hole in the Oregona’s hull. As a result, Oregona filled with water and sank, with the upper deck a foot below the surface of the water. There was no loss of life, and with the aid of Grahamona, most of the cargo was salvaged.

== Business falls off sharply ==
By early 1914, business had fallen off so sharply that O.C.T.C. saw no prospect of revival. Arrangements were then under way for the government to purchase the Willamette Falls Locks and operate them on a toll-free basis. O.C.T.C would be the primary beneficiary of this arrangement, but company officials said it would not be enough. Captain A.B. Graham of O.C.T.C. was quoted in February 1914:

When we started the Yellow Stack Line there were 15 steamers on the Willamette in the trade; now the steamer Grahamona takes care of every pound of freight moving by water. As a result we see no future for three steamers and are prepared to sell either the Oregona or Pomona. There is nothing to indicate, in my mind, that free locks will better the situation. It appears to me as if the Upper Willamette trade will die, as did that on the Upper Columbia, for after the Open River Transportation Company forced wholesale reductions in rail rates, the shippers patronized the railroads and killed the water line.

== Last years of the Yellow Stack Line ==
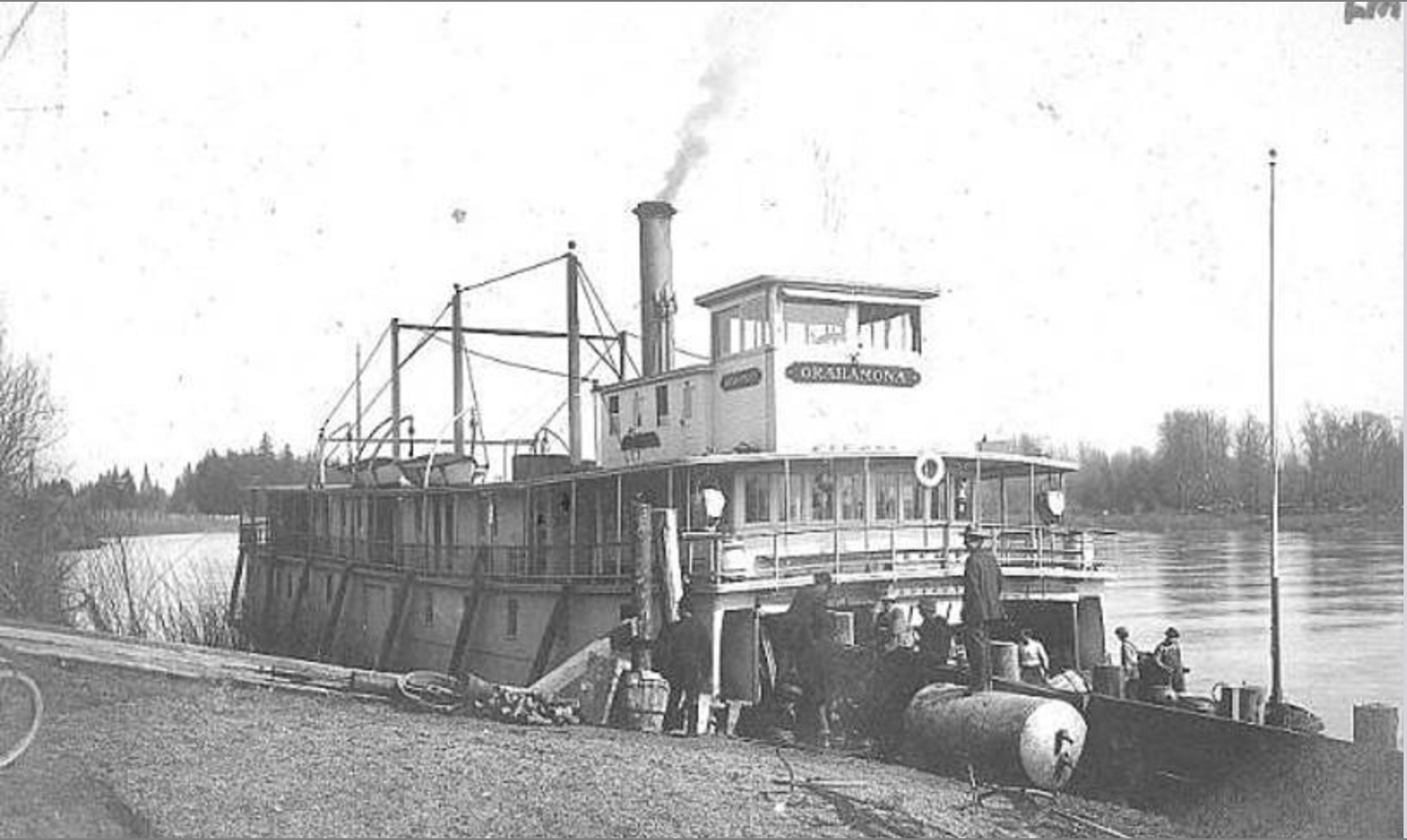
Grahamona at or near Salem, sometime between 1912 and 1918.

=== Ice at Salem ===
The O.C.T.C.’s dock at Salem was located in a slough off the main river. On December 18, 1914, the entire slough was frozen over with ice 2 to 3 inches thick. To keep the channel open out to the main river, the company had to deploy a launch to keep breaking up the ice every 15 minutes as it formed. The temperature the night before was 19 degrees above zero, lower than the previous lowest temperature recorded, which was 22 degrees.

Precipitation falling as snow and freezing into ice in December 1914 also contributed to a lower water level in the river, which compelled O.C.T.C. to use the smaller Oregona for service between Portland and points in the Willamette Valley. The ice conditions continued until December 26, 1914, when the steamers were able to resume normal operation.

=== Service to Peoria ===
By mid-January 1915 the water in the river was high enough to allow Grahamona, then the only steamer on the route, to proceed further upriver from Corvallis, to Peoria, on Sunday, January 17, 1915. O.C.T.C. later applied for a government permit to remove trees overhanging the Willamette upriver from Corvallis, as these were said to be a threat to navigation. On Sunday, February 28, 1915, Grahamona was again able to reach Peoria, where it loaded 100 tons of grain. As of March 3, 1915, there was said to have been 800 tons of wheat and oats accumulated at Peoria awaiting transport to Portland.

=== Labor dispute ===
A widespread strike against shipping firms on the West Coast began in early June, 1916. At about 9:30 p.m. on the night of June 6, 1916, when Grahamona pulled into the O.C.T.C. dock at Salem, Oregon, several persons, apparently sympathetic to the strike, threw rocks at the crew of Grahamona. One deckhand was struck on the harm and seriously injured. Captain Chris Bluhm (c1869-1947) was also injured, when a rock struck him on the leg. Members of Grahamona’s crew grabbed clubs and axes, and pursued the rock throwers.

=== Low water problems ===
On September 3, 1914, when Grahamona passed through the Oregon City locks, fortunately with little freight aboard, there was only 19 inches of water in the locks, and Grahamona drew 18 inches of water at the time. The water was reported to have been at an unusually low level, which was compounded by the use of water to power the electric turbines at the power plant at Willamette Falls. It was reported that some water would be diverted from the turbines to raise the level in the locks by 4 or 5 inches.

Low water was also reported as the "principal" reason for paring back the Corvallis run by Grahamona to one trip a week in late November 1914, rather than three times a week. As of November 27, 1914, Grahamona would proceed as far as Albany on Tuesdays and Thursdays, and would go to Corvallis only on Saturdays, returning to Portland the following Monday.

=== Government takeover of the locks ===
Oregon shipping interests had been pressing for a government takeover of the Willamette Falls Locks. This would act in effect as a subsidy to the shipping interests, as the government would operate the locks on a toll-free basis. In 1915, the government did purchase the locks at Willamette Falls, but the prospect of increased business for steamers never materialized. In 1915, the only vessels regularly using the locks, aside from some cordwood barges coming downriver, were the O.C.T.C. boats, Grahamona, Pomona, and Oregona.

=== Damaged by Morrison Street drawbridge ===
Damage to Grahamona following collision with swinging portion of Morrison drawbridge; note Hawthorne Bridge in backgournd.

On Monday, May 8, 1916, Grahamona was seriously damaged while passing through the draw of Morrison Street bridge in Portland. The Morrison bridge at that time was a swinging structure, pivoting on a caisson to allow river traffic to draw. Grahamona was half-way through the draw, when the swinging-structure, which, if properly functioning, would have stopped when fully open, continued to swing around.

Although the steamer attempted to escape, the bridge structure struck the vessel, destroying several staterooms and ripping up much of the right side of superstructure, including the pursers office, as well as tearing out hog posts, partitions and the upper deck. Damage was estimated at $4,000.

The U.S. Steamboat Inspection Service conducted an investigation into the incident. Pomona took Grahamona’s place while repairs were being effected.

According to one report, the accident was blamed on a strong wind and a worn out gear in the bridge machinery. Multnomah County agreed to repair the boat, but the damages during out to be more than $4,000. On Saturday, May 13, 1916, Grahamona was shifted over from O.C.T.C.’s Taylor Street dock across the Willamette river to Joseph Supple’s boatyard for the repairs to be done.

To expedite repairs, Supple would handle the work on a "day-labor basis." Grahamona was back in service by Saturday, May 27, 1916, when the steamer was charted by the Portland Royal Rosarian booster club for an excursion trom Portland to Oregon City. The total repair bill turned out to be less than originally estimated, $2,129.23, representing $1,281.11 for the costs of materials plus $40 per day for every day the steamer was off the run, plus $848.82 for labor charges.

=== Grounded on Eola Bar ===
On Saturday, June 24, 1916, at about 10:00 pm., just after leaving Salem for Corvaliis, Grahamona struck a snag on the Eola Bar, about 4.5 miles upriver from Salem. At 2:00 a.m. on June 25, 1916, the Spaulding steamer Grey Eagle went to the assistance of Grahamona. Grahamona had a hole in the hull under the firebox, which made it difficult to patch. Water had risen on board sufficiently to prevent the boiler from being able to raise steam, so Grahamona’s steam pumps were not capable of being operated.

The water was shallow, so the deck stayed above the surface of the water. Grey Eagle pumped out enough water so a patch could be placed on the hole, but its position under the firebox made this a difficult task. Grey Eagle took the freight off Grahamona, including the livestock, and returned with it to Salem, then went back to the Eola bar.

By 6:00 pm. on Monday, June 26, 1916, the crew of Grahamona stretched a canvas over the hole, pumped out the hull, and brought the vessel down to Salem. The repair plan at the time was to bring the boat down to Portland, patch the hole, and return the vessel to service on the Corvallis run by the next Saturday, July 1, 1916.

=== Wheel diameter to be reduced ===
On August 3, 1916 it was reported that Grahamona’s wheel would be replaced with one of a smaller diameter, so that the "dip" in the water would be decreased by 8 inches which would make a difference at some points in the river. According to the August 3 report:

It has been said that at times the Yellow Stack steamers "walk over" the bars, which is literally true when buckets on all wheel arms strike bottom. Water is so "thin" above Salem that the company will not send the Grahamona to Independence after today, making Salem the terminus during the low-water season.

Navigation to Corvallis had already been suspended on July 20, 1916, due to low water in the Willamette, with Albany then being the farthest point upriver to receive steamboat service.

== Carriage of hop pickers ==
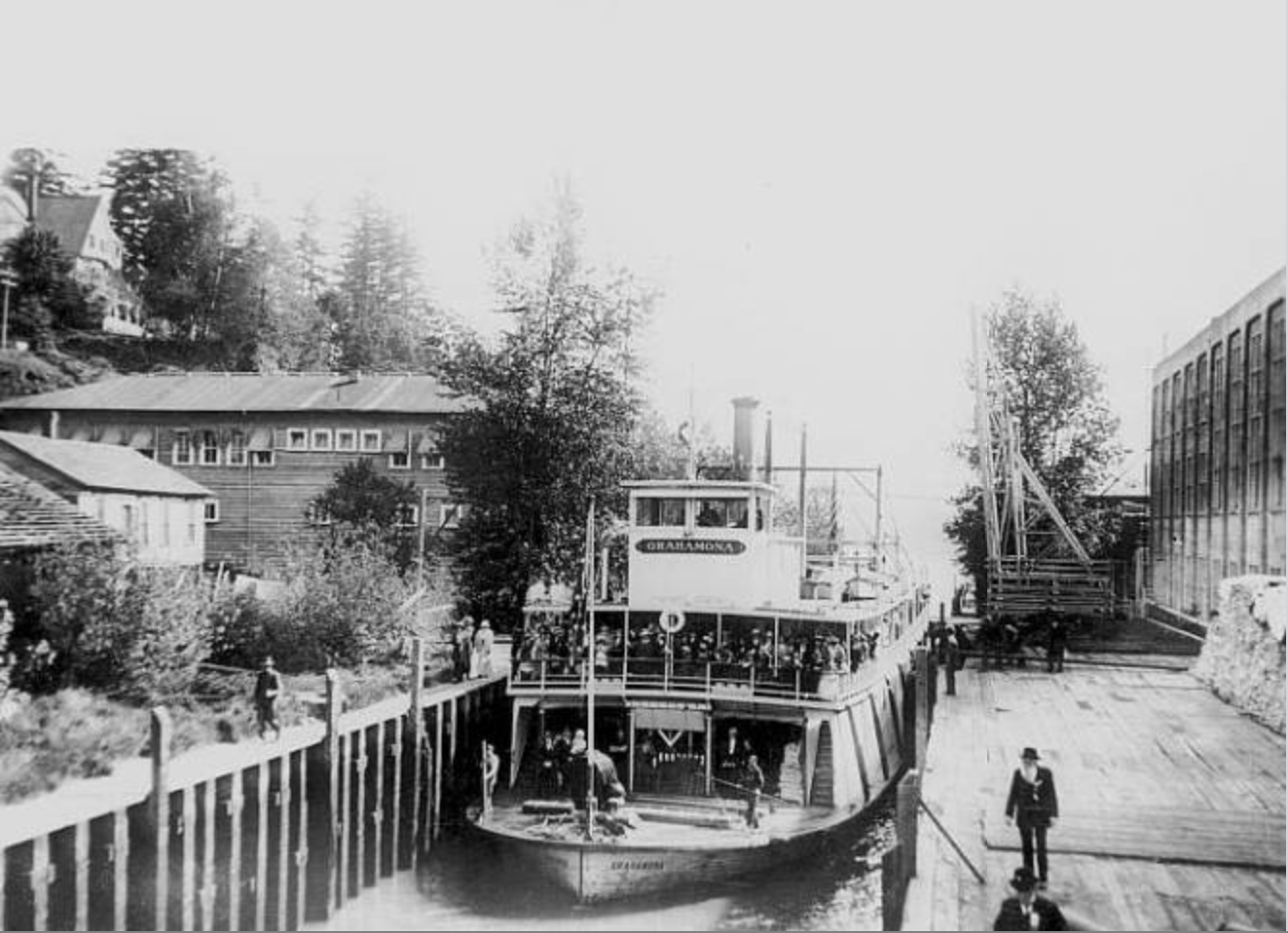
Grahamona in the Willamette Falls Locks, sometime between 1912 and 1918.

For many years the Yellow Stack Line provide transportation for hops pickers seeking work in the hop yards of the Willamette Valley during the early fail. Grahamona and Pomona provided transportation during the harvest seasons in 1914, 1915, and 1916. Low water levels during hops season made navigation on the river difficult.

The boats would carry hop pickers, their luggage, tents and family members to Butteville, Champoeg, Newburg, and private landings along the Willamette and Yamhill rivers. The upriver transports general occurred all in one week, while the returns downriver were spread out over three weeks or a month. Once, with Capt. Clyde Raabe in command, Grahamona carried 800 pickers on the boat, far more than the boat's licensed capacity of 300 passengers on regular runs.

=== 1914 season ===
In the 1914 season, on the morning of Saturday, August 29, between 500 and 600 pickers departed from O.C.T.C's Taylor Street dock for the hops fields in the Willamette Valley. The day before, Grahamona had carried 300 pickers, and both vessels had been "thronged" during that week. According to a newspaper report:

The Yellow Stack dock resembled a big storage warehouse for household goods yesterday, as every sort of camp equipment, all sizes and shapes of baggage rolls and many kinds of personal belongings were piled there to be trucked aboard steamers last night to accompany the pickers.

=== 1915 season ===
In the 1915 season, on August 31, Grahamona transported about 300 pickers to hop yards along the upper Willamette. The next day, September 1, 1915, Grahamona transported more than 400 pickers upriver to the hop yards.

Low water again proved to be an issue in the 1915 season. In early September 1915, Grahamona found just 1.8 feet of water over the sill at the Willamette Falls Locks. Capt. A.B. Graham of the Yellow Stack Line said that the lack of water in the locks was due to the diversion of the river's flow through nearby hydroelectric power generators.

Graham said that the use of water by the generators ought to be regulated, particularly at the time of year when there was such a demand for transport of pickers to reach the hop yards. According to one report, during the 1915 hops season, on one trip carrying 200 pickers in the first few days of September, the water level in the locks was too low for them to be used at all. Grahamona arrived at the locks, but the water was too low to allow it to transit the locks. The passengers had to be landed and wait on the banks of the river three hours for a steamboat to take them down river.

=== 1916 season ===
In 1916, on Saturday, September 2, Grahamona and Pomona transported 700 pickers upriver from Portland.

=== Drowning of a returning hops picker ===
On September 15, 1916, while returning from the hops fields, a boy aged 15, named Arleigh Hauvenmen (also spelled Huovinen), fell overboard from Grahamona and was drowned According to one report, the boy had been playing on a pile of sacks when he fell off the boat. Captain Bluhm, in charge of the vessel, stopped the steamer and tried to find Hauvenmen, who was seen to come up above the water and then go down and not come up again.

The boy was the sole support of his widowed mother, and had on him a check for $27 representing his earnings from picking hops. Six days later, on September 21, 1916, when passing near the spot where the boy had fallen in, the crew of Grahamona found the boy's body. On January 8, the boy's mother, Mrs. Ida Huovinen, sued O.C.T.C. for $30,086. The allegation was that the boat was overcrowded, and the boy was forced to stand too close to the edge of the deck.

== Termination of upper Willamette service ==
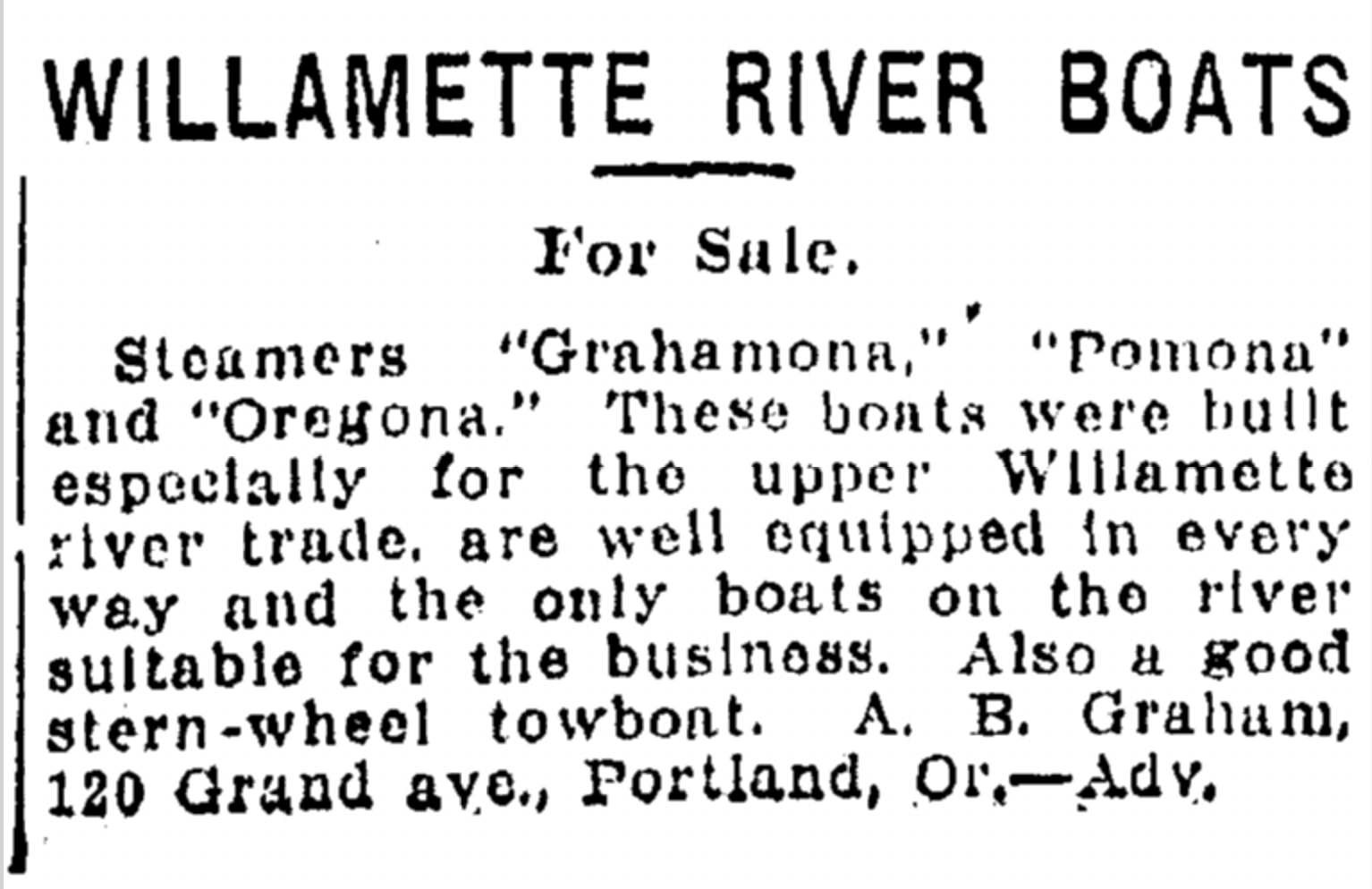
Advertisement for sale of Yellow Stack Line boats, August 3, 1919.

On May 2, 1918, it was reported that O.C.T.C. would be permanently terminating all steamboat service to Corvallis because of high costs and insufficient business. Grahamona’s last run from Corvallis on Monday, May 6, 1918, would be the last commercial steamer to depart from that city.

O.C.T.C. proved to be unable to compete with steam and electric rail lines in the Willamette Valley. In the year prior to the withdrawal from service, Grahamona had carried only an average of 35 tons of freight per trip, when the boat was capable of loading 200 tons. The revenue from the freight carried was insufficient to pay the expenses of the boat.

The three vessels in the fleet, Grahamona, Pomona, and Oregona, were to be sold or leased, the company's dock in Portland at Taylor street would be given up, and the company's labor force would be discharged. According to the Morning Oregonian:

The Grahamona leaves Portland Saturday morning for Corvallis and when she arrives here Monday night on the return trip three long blasts from her whistle will signalize her good-by to the Upper Willamette service.

== Placed on Portland-Lewiston route ==
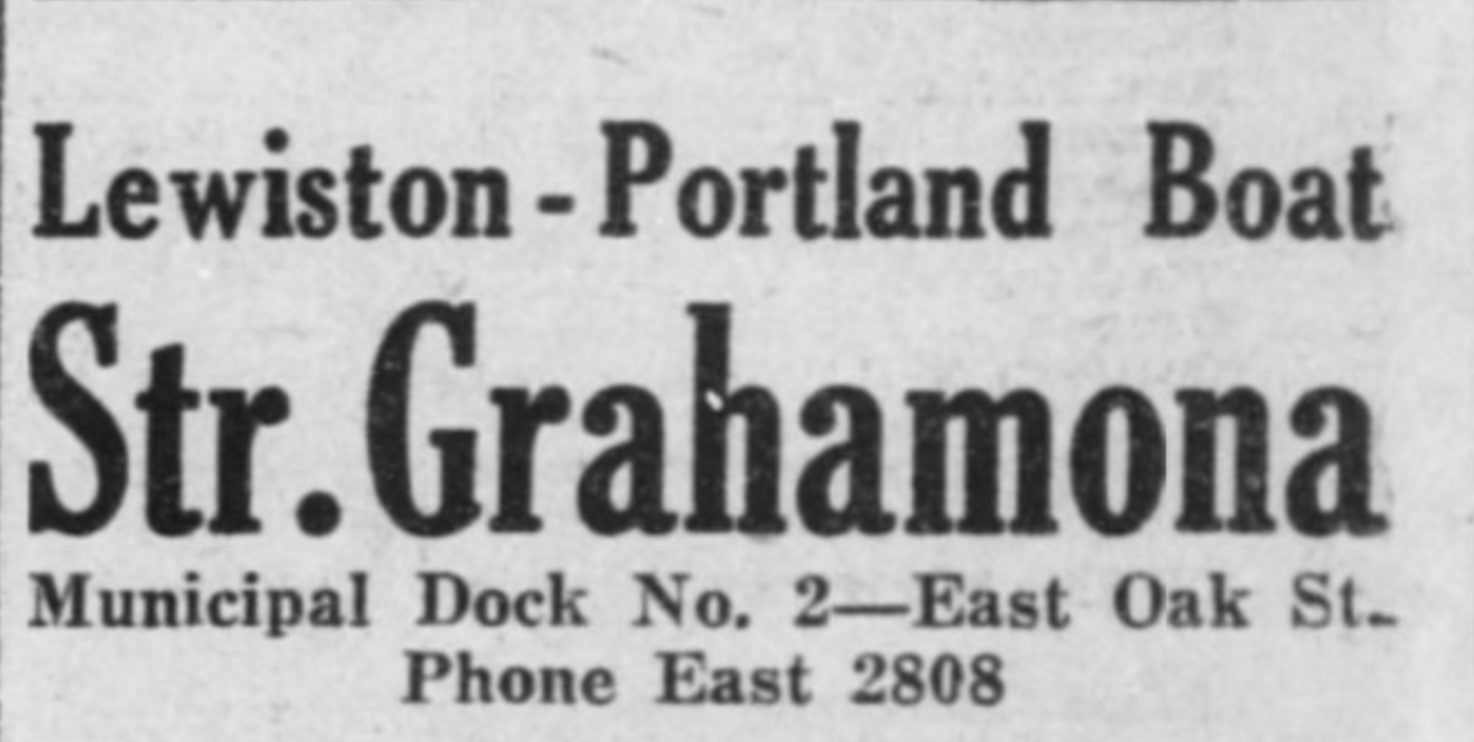
Advertisement for Portland-Lewiston service by Grahamona, June 17, 1919.

On May 1, 1919, Capt. C. Raabe of O.C.T.C. announced Grahamona would be placed on a running from Portland, Oregon to Lewiston, Idaho. Lewiston was the farthest point that could be reached on navigable waters on the west side of the Rocky Mountains. The run from Portland to Lewiston was reported to have been 500 miles, one of the longest in North America. On this route, Grahamona would use the Celilo Canal, then recently completed by the government at a cost of $4,000,000.

The first run was to originate from Portland on Wednesday night, at 10:00 p.m., June 11, 1919, under two very experienced captains, Clyde Raabe, and Art Riggs. Reportedly 100 tons of freight had been assembled at Lewiston awaiting pick up and transport downstream by Grahamona.

Before the trip, now reported to be 388 miles in length, was undertaken, Grahamona was overhauled, with additional keelsons installed and converted to a coal burner. Conversion to oil-firing was considered but rejected as it was thought the cost would be too great on the Lewiston route. The shallow draft of Grahamona was thought to give some advantage on the Snake River.

Grahamona was only able to make two trips to Lewiston that year. Coming back down river from Lewiston, the boat hit a boulder off Haunted House shoal in the Snake River and as a result had to be beached. Grahamona’s crew was reported to have built a bulkhead around the hull breach, so that the steamer could return to Portland for repairs. At that time, O.C.T.C. officials believed that only one more trip could be made to Lewiston before low water in the Snake river prevented navigation. For the trip, the company secured the steamer Nespelem to replace the damaged Grahamona.

== Sale to the Inland Empire Company ==
On January 5, 1920, it was reported that articles of incorporation would be filed that day for the Inland Empire Boat & Truck Company. The new company would take over the O.C.T.C.’s steamers, including Grahamona, and would commence operations on March 1. The business plan would be to operate truck lines from the principal landings on the Columbia and the Willamette Rivers, with Grahamona serving on the Columbia. The steamers were to have been converted to oil burners. Capt. A.B. Graham, formerly of O.C.T.C., would be manager of the new company, of which he was also an incorporator. Capt. Clyde Raabe would be superintendent of the steamboat service.

The trucks would act as feeders, collecting freight and bringing it to depots on the river, with the objective of beating the shipping rates charged by railroads by 10%. On the Columbia, the steamboat landings and collection points would be at Kennewick, Pasco, Wallula, Umatilla, Blalock, and Rufus. No stops for freight would be made west of the Celilo Canal. However, this formula, which had worked on Puget Sound, did not work on the Columbia and Willamette river systems, and it was soon given up.

== Sale to Portland Navigation Company ==
On April 1, 1920, a newly incorporated concern, the Portland Navigation Company, bought Grahamona and acquired options to purchase Pomona and Oregona. Capt. Clyde Raabe was to be general manager of the new company and was one of its incorporators. Grahamona had not been converted to oil-firing, and was intended to burn coal on the route. Raabe was going to negotiate with the oil companies, and if a sufficient supply of oil fuel could be obtained, the conversion would proceed. As of the date of the company's incorporation, April 1, 1920, the route for Grahamona had not yet been determined.

Grahamona resumed service on the Willamette on April 19, 1920, running from Salem to Portland, carrying a "heavy cargo of merchandise and produce and several passengers." Docking facilities at Salem were donated by the Spaulding Lumber Company. Lack business forced cancellation of the Portland-Salem service on May 13, 1920.

== Renamed and leased to telephone company ==
Sometime between April 19 and May 27, 1920, the Portland Navigation Company renamed Grahamona as Northwestern. On May 27, 1920, Northwestern was scheduled to depart Portland for Lewiston under Capt. Clyde Raabe, resuming the service that had been interrupted after only two trips the year before.

As of November 27, 1921, Northwestern was leased by the Pacific Telephone & Telegraph to transport its line crews on the Columbia River. The lease was reported to run until February 1923, with Northwestern carrying both men and material for the telephone company, on both the Columbia and Snake rivers, with Captain Raabe in command.

== Return to the Willamette ==
On September 2, 1923, Northwestern was leased by Captains Chris Bluhm, J.E. Exon, and J.L. Bacon who intended to resume service from Portland to Salem. On June 11, 1926, Northwestern, then operating between Portland and Salem, was reported to have been grounded on a gravel bar just down river from the Wheatland Ferry, about 10 miles north of Salem. By 1928, Northwestern was owned by the Salem Navigation Company. Northwestern operated on the Portland-Salem run in conjunction with a rare newly built sternwheeler, Stranger (built 1928), |to provide service from Portland to Salem.

Northwestern was forced off the Portland-Salem route in about 1934 by competition from highway trucks.

== Excursions to Bonneville Dam ==
Cascades (right) and Northwestern (left), at waterfront at Portland, Oregon, August 16, 1936.

In the late 1930s, Northwestern carried tourists on excursions up the Columbia Gorge to the Bonneville Dam, a 120-mile round trip from Portland. In 1936, Northwestern was chartered by businessman Ralph J. Staehil, to run on excursions up the Columbia River to view the newly built. Bonneville Dam These excursions carried capacity loads of passengers, which was fortunate, or so it at least it was claimed, for Northwestern, which, having been built for shallow water, required a considerable load before its sternwheel would even touch the water.

Northwestern worked with the sternwheeler Cascades for these excursions. On August 16, 1936, the two steamers carried a total of 500 people from the Portland sea wall on the 110 mile round trip to Bonneville. That day, Cascades and Northwestern were rafted up together as passengers boarded, presenting a scene that had not occurred in Portland in many years. Although the excursions themselves were popular, overall Northwestern was only seldom employed in the late 1930s, and had had little financial success.

== Annual reunions at Champoeg ==
In 1932, 1935, and 1938, the Association of Veteran Steamboatmen chartered Northwestern to carry its members from Portland to its annual meeting at Champoeg. These reunions were well attended during the 1930s, with for example 6000 people present for the 1932 meeting. As the place where the provisional government was declared in 1843, Champoeg was considered to be the most historic spot in the state of Oregon.

Prior to the 1938 excursion, which took place on June 28, Northwestern had been lying idle along Northwest Front Avenue, at Marine Ways, Inc., since the close of the tourist season the previous summer. Considerable volunteer work by river professionals was necessary to restore the boat to a condition where it could pass an inspection to be permitted to carry passengers. This was done, and the boat was expected to carry 300 people to the annual gathering, at a price of $1 per person to cover expenses.

Captain A.B. Graham was one of the passengers on Northwestern on the 1938 trip, which took 4.5 hours to reach Champoeg, including one hour to clear the locks. Among those attending and giving remarks at the event was Brigadier General George C. Marshall, then commandant of the Vancouver Barracks. The excursion to Champoeg was one of the last local trips of the Northwestern.

== Transfer to Alaska ==
=== Sale to Alaska interests ===
In 1939, Northwestern was sold and transferred to Alaska for service on the Kuskokwim River. The purchaser was the Alaska Rivers Navigation Company, a concern owned by Capt. Wallace Langley (1866–1946), of Seattle, who also owned the Santa Ana Steamship Company. With Northwestern gone, the only steamer service above Willamette Falls was provided by the occasional trips of the Claire.

Northwestern would be towed from the Columbia River to the mouth of the Kuskokwim River, which was on the Bering Sea, about 100 miles south of Bristol Bay and about 200 mlles south of the mouth of the Yukon River.

=== Preparation for tow ===
Northwestern, with reinforcing timbers added, departing Willamette River, May 17, 1939. Shaver tug Cruiser on left, Hawthorne Bridge in background.

During the Klondike Gold Rush of 1898, two attempts to tow sternwheelers from the Columbia to the mouth of the Yukon River, also in the Bering Sea, had failed, when the towed steamers were badly damaged in a storm. To prevent this from happening to Northwestern, workers at the Portland Shipbuilding Company bolted layers of heavy timbers over and under the hull, on top of the deck, and around the bow. They also reinforced the house (the cabin structure) with additional bracing. This work was personally overseen by Captain Langley.

The River Boiler Works, at the foot of Southeast Taylor Street, in Portland, carried out boiler repairs. A special length of rope 10 inches in circumference and 240 feet long was prepared for use in the tow. This rope was to be used between the steel towing cables, because it was more elastic than steel, and would prevent jerking which could damage the towed steamer. A two-way radio telephone was installed in the wheelhouse of the steamer to allow ready communication with the tug and other vessels during the course of the tow.

=== Route to Alaska ===
The projected towing route was to bring the Northwestern to Puget Sound, and then tow the steamer north through the protected waters of the Inside Passage to Alaska. There would still be a long distance to cover after that, and the tow would have to cross open ocean around the Alaska Peninsula and through the Aleutian Islands to the town of Bethel, at the mouth of the Kuskokwim.

The tow to Alaska would be long (2,611 miles from Clallam Bay) and hazardous. A small crew would remain on the Northwestern while under tow, to keep steam up in the boiler and steer the vessel. When the boat departed Port Townsend, a few days after leaving Portland, there was a crew of 10 on board, including seven persons from Portland and three from Seattle.

=== Departure ===
On Wednesday, May 17, 1939, Northwestern departed Portland in tow of the diesel tug Cruiser, owned by the Shaver firm.

At Astoria, Oregon, the Arthur Foss was scheduled to take over for the rest of the voyage. However Arthur Foss was not available, and as of May 19, 1939, Northwestern was waiting at the Port of Astoria terminal for another tug.

On Saturday, May 20, 1939, the two vessels reached Port Townsend, Washington at the northernmost part of Puget Sound. Northwestern and the tug departed Port Townsend three hours later. (Another source gives the point of departure as Clallam Bay.) Early in the morning on Friday, May 26, 1939, the tug and tow were reported to have been at the Wrangell Narrows, a distance of about 935 miles from Portland according to the route followed. (Another source indicates the departure point was to have been Port Angeles.

As of June 14, 1939, Northwestern and the tug had last been reported seen at Goodnews Bay, which is about 120 miles south of Bethel. However, no direct communication from the tow had been communicated either to Wallace Langley or to the tow boat operator.

The steamer had encountered no real difficulties on the tow until it reached the vicinity of Kodiak Island. Rough sea conditions there began to seriously damage the boat, breaking the hog chains and twisting the upper cabin structure out of shape. Water flooded the lower deck and the crew were compelled to wear life preservers for two days.

The tug and tow reached the harbor at Chigoik, Alaska where repairs were made.

== Service on the Kuskokwim River ==
Northwestern on Kuskokwim River, offloading lumber at Sterling Landing, intended for use at Yankee Camp, ca. 1948.

Northwestern was intended to run on a route between Bethel and McGrath. Bethel was the head of navigation for ocean-going vessels. The length of Bethel-McGrath route has been reported differently. Sources say it was 500, 550 or 650) miles long.

After Northwestern arrived at Bethel in 1939, the steamer was put on the route up river to McGrath. Steamers of the Santa Ana Steamship Company brought cargo from Seattle to Bethel to be distributed to McGrath and inland points en route by sternwheelers on the river.

=== 1939 season ===
Northwestern made three round trips before the close of the 1939 summer river transport season due to ice on the river. Northwestern operated with another sternwheeler, the Langley Working with three barges, the two steamers moved 3100 tons of freight between Bethel and McGrath. McGrath was the headquarters of the new owner's river service. In 1939, it had an airfield with regular air service to Seward and Fairbanks, Alaska.

Northwestern's first master on the river was Capt. George M. Walker, who was succeeded by the (apparently unrelated) Capt. Eli M. Walker. In October 1939, Northwestern was placed into winter storage at McGrath.

=== 1940 season ===
During the 1940 season, government construction of air fields and radio beacon stations created a lot of business for Northwestern. Northwestern made 5 and 1/2 round trips, of 550 miles one way from Bethel to McGrath, in the 1940 season, which lasted five months and ended October 1, 1940. According to Robert W. "Bert" Kern, chief engineer and a Portland resident, "we pushed two barges most of the time, hauling mining machinery, caterpillars, bulldozers, dredging outfits, ready-built houses to be put together at McGrath, and anything else you can imagine they might need. The airfield at McGrath was almost midway between Anchorage and Nome, and 8 to 10 planes were landing there every day during the summer of 1940.

=== 1941 season ===
Northwestern made six round trips between Bethel and McGrath, each time pushing two barges and transporting 600 tons of freight. During the 1941 season, and throughout its Alaska service Northwestern was operated by officers and a number of crewmen from Portland. They would fly into and out of the airfield at McGrath at the beginning and end of the season. Alaska riverboat owners sought personnel with Columbia and Willamette steamboat experience because of similarities in the river systems of the two areas. Wages were also higher in Alaska, which made Alaska service attractive to employees.

=== Later years ===
In its later years of operation, Northwestern was commanded by Roy Atkins, a resident of Portland, who was also master of Langley as well during the summer shipping season. Northwestern was rebuilt in the 1946 season and did not operate on the river. Langley was hard-pressed to transport that season's cargo without Northwestern.

=== 1947 season ===
Preparations for the 1947 season began in early April, when Chief Engineer R.W. "Bert" Kern deported Portland for Alaska. In April, the boats were still locked in solid ice. Temperatures the previous winter had reached 68 degrees below zero. To free the hulls from the ice, without pulling out the oakum caulking between the planking, the crews had to fill the hulls with water, then heat the water by running steam lines through it. The heat generated by the warmed water would gradually melt the ice on the outside of the hull, without tearing out the oakum. After this, the boats still had to be kept out of the main flow of the river until the May ice jams had passed.

During the 1947 season, Northwestern made five round-trips on the Bethel-McGrath route. Each trip the steamer pushed or towed a steel barge, and together both vessels loaded about 1,000 tons of freight at Bethel. They arrived at McGrath with about 600 tons of freight, having off-loaded the rest at various landings along the 600 mile route.

=== Oil fuel conversion postponed ===
Both Northwestern and Langley were still wood-burners at the start of the 1947 season. They depended on Native Alaskans to cut and sell cordwood to them. Prices for the marten furs trapped and sold by Native Alaskans had dropped to $15 a pelt, down from the 1946 high of $100. With fur prices down, to earn money the Native Alaskans supplied wood in 1947 in such supply that owners of Northwestern and Langley were able to postpone conversion to oil-firing.

At the end of the season, the steamboats were taken to a slough away from the main river, where they would be protected from damage from ice during the spring breakup. The steel barges were hauled ashore, to be painted the next spring. The season ended two weeks early due to the early arrival of the cargo steamer at Bethel that year.

== Abandonment ==
According to a non-contemporaneous source, Northwestern was still in service on the Kuskokwim River as of June 1949. However, according to contemporaneous source, as of June 25, 1949 Northwestern was "virtually abandoned" on bank of the Kuskokwim river near McGrath.

== See also ==
- Steamboats of the Willamette River
