= Imnaha (sternwheeler) =

American merchant vessel

- Imnaha at Eureka Landing, Oregon, 1903

History
- Name: Imnaha
- Owner: .Lewiston Southern Company (or Lewiston Southern Navigation Co.)
- Route: Snake River
- Cost: $20,000
- Completed: 1903
- Maiden voyage: June 30, 1903
- Out of service: 1903
- Identification: U.S.
- Fate: Wrecked

General characteristics
- Class & type: riverine all-purpose
- Length: 124 ft (37.8 m) over hull (exclusive of fantail)
- Beam: 25.4 ft 9 in (8.0 m) over hull (exclusive of guards
- Depth: 4.5 ft 0 in (1.37 m)
- Decks: two (main and passenger)
- Installed power: twin steam engines, horizontally mounted, each with bore of 16 in (406 mm) and stroke of 7 ft (2.13 m); 600 total indicated HP; coal-fired boiler
- Propulsion: stern-wheel
- Speed: 17 miles per hour (claimed)
- Capacity: Licensed to carry 100 passengers

Imhaha was a stern-wheel steamboat which operated on the Snake River in the Pacific Northwest in 1903. The steamer was built, launched, placed in service, and wrecked within a single year. The rapids on the Snake river had only rarely been surmounted by a steamboat, and generally only with the aid of a steel cable for lining used to winch the entire boat upstream through the rapids. After only a few trips, Imnaha was destroyed in Mountain Sheep rapids, just downstream from the mining settlement of Eureka, on the Oregon side of the river.

== Construction ==
Imnaha was built at Lewiston, Idaho for the Lewiston Southern Company or the Lewiston Southern Navigation Company.

According to one source, the steamer was supposedly built much less strongly than other boats of the day. According to another source, Imnaha was "studily built and cross-braced in the bow."

Imnaha was the most important boat built on the upper Columbia river system in 1903. The builder was Joseph Supple. Another source gives the builder's name as one Kaston.

Most of the work was done in Portland, Oregon, with the components sent to Lewiston in "knock-down" form for assembly by the Snake River. There was some delay in obtaining delivery of the boat's boilers, and so it was planned to launch the boat without them.

When delivered, the boilers were to furnish steam at 250 pounds pressure, generating 500 horsepower

The rapids on the Snake River flowed at speeds of 12 miles per hour in some places, and the only way for the boat to negotiate the currents going up river was to line through them by cranking in a steel cable attached to a steel bolt mounted in a rock on the shore.

Prior to the completion of the boat, the president of the company, G.A. Nehrhood, stated that the vessel's speed of 17 miles per hour should alone allow it to surmount the rapids, and the hoisting cable was just an extra precaution.

Imnaha would be equipped with one-half mile of steel cable connected to a capstan powered by a steam donkey engine to haul the steamer up through the rapids.

No boat had yet negotiated the rapids upstream on the Snake River. By April 29, 1903, the boilers still had not been delivered.

== Owners and officers ==
The Lewiston Southern Company was a subsidiary of the Eureka Mining Company, which was formed to exploit a supposed copper-rich mining area near Eureka, Oregon. The men behind the Eureka Mining Company were named Barton and Hibbs. They were engaged in stock fraud, by overstating the value of the company's stock, and then disappearing with the proceeds.

Capt. Harry C. Baughman was to be the master of Imnaha. J.C. Campbell was to be chief engineer.

== Dimensions ==
Imnaha was 124 ft (37.8 m) over hull (exclusive of fantail, which was the extension over the stern on which the stern-wheel was mounted, with a beam of 25.4 ft 9 in (8.0 m) over hull (exclusive of guards, and depth of hold of 4.5 ft 0 in (1.37 m). The overall size of the steamer was 330 gross and 216 registered tons. Imnaha was licensed to carry 100 passengers

Imnaha was reported to have cost $20,000 to build.

== Engineering ==
The boiler for Imnaha was built by W. J. Salberg & Son of La Crosse, Wisconsin. The boiler was about 13 feet long, 60 inches in diameter and contained 178 flue pipes, each 2.25 inches in diameter. It was tested to a steam pressure of 225 pounds per square inch. Imnaha's boilers were coal-fired, and required loading of 70 tons of coal per trip. The boat was equipped with a complete blacksmithing outfit on board. Regarding the steamer's ability to run upstream through rapids, Captain Baughman claimed that "with good fuel, the Imnaha could climb a tree." The best fuel was pitch-filled pine, but there was little of it available at the river level in Hell's Canyon. Cordword cut in the higher elevations had to be hauled eight miles by wagon, and was expensive.

== Route ==
The steamer Imnaha was the sole source of supplies for the 2,000 people who had flooded into Eureka, 55 miles upriver from Lewiston, based on news of the copper strike. Imnaha made 14 trips to Eureka from Lewiston.

Before the construction of the Imnaha, all the supplies for the mines at Eureka had to be hauled overland from Elgin, OR.

Eighty men were employed at the Lewiston Southern's mines at Eureka. In April, 1903, the company was reported to have invested $500,000 invested in mines and granite quarries at Eureka. On April 29, 1903, a pre-fabricated smelter was on the dock at Lewiston, waiting for Imnaha to be completed so it could be hauled up to Eureka to be assembled.

== Operations ==
Imnaha in Mountain Sheep rapids.

On April 21, 1903, Imnaha was reported to be "complete in every detail except the boiler." There was at that time no definitive date by which the boiler was to arrive, and it would take about 10 days work to install the boiler once it did arrive.

The boilers finally arrived in Lewiston on Sunday night, June 14, 1903. The reason for the delay was that the boat's chief engineer, J.C. Campbell, having inspected the route, ordered changes to the boiler design.

=== Trial run ===
On Saturday July 1, 1903, Imnaha made its trial run to Riparia, Washington.

=== First commercial trip ===
On July 4, Imnaha made its first commercial trip upriver to the town of Eureka, Oregon, on the Oregon side of the Snake River, at the mouth of the Imnaha River. Eureka Bar landing was 52 miles upriver from Lewiston. It took the steamer 14 hours to make the round trip. This was only the second time that a steamer had reached Eureka at the confluence of the Imnaha and the Snake rivers. Capt. Harry C. Baughman, son of pioneer steamboat captain, E.W. Baughman, was in command. The first steamer had been the Colonel Wright, in 1864.

=== Navigation improvement work ===
Low water in July and August hindered of steamboat operations. The main navigation obstructions on the Snake River between Lewiston and Pittsburg Landing were rock ledges and isolated boulders in the rapids, which at all stages of the river were hazardous, to a greater or lesser degree, to navigation.

At the beginning of the low water season in July 1903, the U.S. Army Corps of Engineers hired a blasting crew to work in small boats to remove boulders at Mountain Sheep Rapids, Bear Creek Rapids, and upriver from the mouth of the Salmon River. However the current, flowing at 10 to 14 miles per hour, was so swift that it was possible to do this work safely or effectively in small boats.

Arrangements were made then to contract with the steamer Imnaha, at $47.50 per day, to perform the work. The boat began work on August 15, 1903.

Using the steamer, a steam drill could be used on the submerged rocks and ledges in the middle of the stream. Obstructions at Ten-Mile Rapids, Buffalo Rock, and Grand Ronde rapids.

On its first trip to improve navigation, Imnaha embarked ten 50-pound boxes of high grade explosives.

On September 4, 1903, Imnaha suffered a mishap on Wild Goose rapids, which knocked a hole in the hull, requiring the vessel to be taken downriver to Riparia for repairs, and forcing abandonment of the use of the steam drill. A crew was left at Wild Goose rapids to work from small boats, but this effort had to be suspended on September 11, 1903 due to low water in the river.

There was a great demand for river transport to the mines, and freight was backed up on the dock at Eureka waiting to be carried upriver by Imnaha.

In early September 1903, Imnaha was reported to be unable to ascend the Snake River. On November 7, 1903, the river level at Lewiston was reported to be rising, so that soon Imnaha could resume its trips upriver to Eureka.

== Wreck ==
For a steamer move upriver through the rapids on the Snake River, It was necessary to "line" through the rapids. Lining consisted of running a cable out from a winch on the steamer to a bolt secured in a rock on the shore. Once the cable was secured to the bolt, the winch would then crank in the cable, pulling the steamer upstream through the rapids.

On Monday, November 9, 1903, Imnaha was proceeding upriver from Lewiston, and had just lined through Mountain Sheep Rapids, when a lining cable became entangled with the steamer's eccentric rod. Mountain Sheep Rapids were two miles downriver from Eureka.

This prevented the stern-wheel from turning, causing it to lose forward momentum. Imnaha drifted back downriver into the rapids, where it was wrecked and became an $18,000 total loss. All passengers were rescued. Loss to the cargo was estimated at $1,000. An early newspaper report estimated the cargo loss at $8,000 and the steamer value at $25,000. There was no insurance.
