= Relief (1858 sternwheeler) =

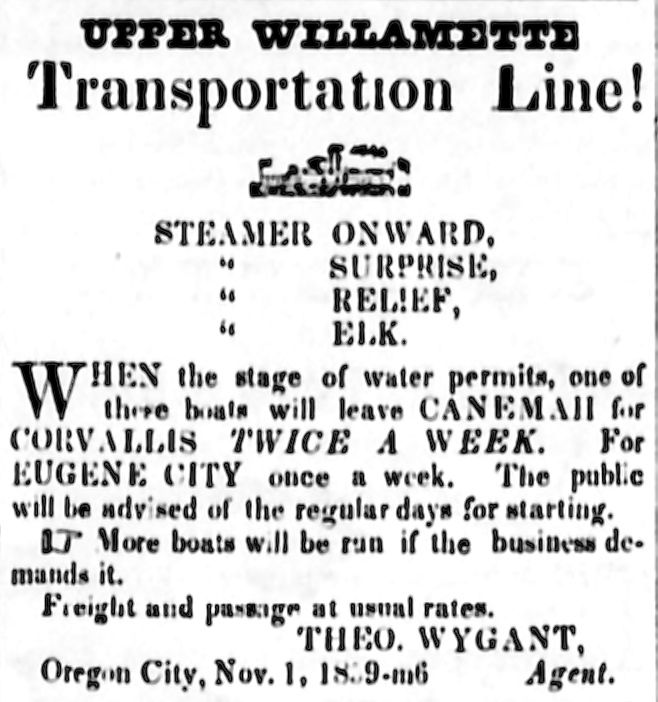
- Advertisement for Relief and other steamers, placed January 21, 1860.

History
- Operator: (1) Cassedy, Athey, O’Laughlin, Sturtevant & Co.; (2) John C. Ainsworth; (3) Upper Willamette Transportation Line; (4) People's Transportation Co.
- Route: Willamette River
- In service: 1858
- Out of service: 1865
- Fate: Dismantled at Canemah, Oregon

General characteristics
- Class & type: riverine all-purpose
- Tonnage: 97 gross tons.
- Length: 110 ft (33.5 m) over hull (exclusive of fantail)
- Beam: 24 ft (7.3 m) over hull (exclusive of guards)
- Depth: 3.5 ft (1.07 m)
- Installed power: twin steam engines, horizontally mounted, each with bore of 13 in (33.0 cm) and stroke of 4 ft (1.22 m), 9.6 nominal horsepower
- Propulsion: stern-wheel

Relief was a stern-wheel driven steamboat that operated on the Willamette River from 1858 to 1865. Relief ran for a short time on the route from Portland to Oregon City, Oregon. After being bought out by the competition, Relief was lined around Willamette Falls to the upper Willamette, where it became the first steamboat to reach Springfield. This vessel should not be confused with a later vessel, also named Relief, which operated on the Columbia and Lewis rivers from 1906 to 1931.

== Construction ==
Relief was built in 1858 for the firm of Cassidy (or Cassedy) & Co. The steamer was reported to have been well-built.

Relief was built at Linn City, Oregon, across the Willamette River from Oregon City, where another steamer, the Carrie Ladd was being built at the same time. Construction was under way by early April, 1858.

The original owners were also referred to as O’Loughlin and Company and as Cassedy, Athey, O’Laughlin, Sturtevant & Co.

== Design ==
Relief was designed to navigate the Clackamas Rapids, on the Willamette River not far below Oregon City, at any season of the year.

== Dimensions ==
Relief was either 102 ft (31.1 m) or 110 ft (33.5 m) long, measured over the hull, and excluding the extension of the main deck over the stern, called the “fantail” on which the stern-wheel was mounted.

Relief had a beam of 24 ft (7.3 m), exclusive of the guards, which were heavy timbers installed along the sides of the vessel at the top edge of the hull as protective measure. The depth of hold was 3.5 ft (1.07 m).

The overall size of the vessel was 97 gross tons, which was a unit of volume rather than weight.

== Engineering ==
Relief was driven by a stern-wheel, turned by twin steam engines, horizontally mounted, each with bore of 13 in (33.0 cm) and stroke of 4 ft (1.22 m), generating 9.6 nominal horsepower. The machinery was manufactured by Rossi & Sons at their Willamette Iron Works.

== Operations ==
Relief made its trial trip on Monday, August 16, 1858. The steamer was scheduled to make a run to Vancouver, W.T. on August 21, 1858.

=== Opposition to the Jennie Clark ===
Cassedy and Company placed Relief into service in August 1858, running in opposition to the steamer Jennie Clark, which was owned by John C. Ainsworth and Jacob Kamm. In November 1858, Cassedy advertised rates on the Relief, running between Portland and Oregon City, as $2.50 per ton for freight and 50 cents for passengers. Cassedy held out the following appeal:

Merchants, farmers, and travelers, who have any interest in having prices kept down at the present reasonable rates, would do well to patronize our boat. Of what permanent advantage will it be to the community to give their custom to a MONEYED MONOPOLY, which will carry free for a short time to break down competition, so as to be able to put the screws on again?

Cassedy also reminded that the steamers Jennie Clark, Express and Carrie Ladd all belonged to a single company.

Cassedy held only a minority interest in the company. The other principal shareholders, of whom one O’Loughlin, a ferryman, was one, did not agree with Cassedy on how the boat should be operated. O’Loughlin was suspicious of his partners, and kept a close watch on the purser, one Sturdevant (or Sturtevant), who was also a shareholder.

=== Control purchased by competitor ===
The competition between Relief and Jennie Clark grew so hot that Captain Ainsworth secretly bought up the majority of shares of the Relief, then had the boat tied up.

== Transfer to upper Willamette River ==
The next year, Ainsworth sold Relief to Captain John Wilson Cochran (1823–1913), who had the steamer lined around Willamette Falls, to be placed on the Upper Willamette River.

On Tuesday, October 4, 1859, with Captain Cochran in command, Relief returned to Oregon City from Corvallis, with 85 tons of freight, the largest load ever carried by the steamer up to that time. Freight rates at that time on the upper Willamette River were $12 per ton for freight going upriver, and $7 per ton for freight going downriver from Corvallis, $6 per ton for downriver cargo from Salem.

As of November 1, 1859, Relief had been formed into a single concern, called the Upper Willamette Transportation Line, which also included the steamers Onward, Elk, and Surprise. All four vessels had a common agent, Capt. Theo. Wygant. In November 1859, when the water level in the river permitted, one of the lines boats would depart Canemah twice a week for Corvallis, and, once a week, for Eugene City. This arrangement continued until July 1860.

== Escape from fire ==
On the night of April 23/24, 1861, Relief was nearly destroyed by fire at the dock at Linn City. Relief and another steamer, James Clinton, having arrived in the afternoon, were moored in the boat basin upriver from the works of the Oregon Milling and Transportation Company, The fire originated in the company's warehouse and quickly spread. There was later talk that the cause might have been arson.

People tried to save the two vessels, both built entirely of wood, and they were successful in the case of the Relief, which even so was still damaged. The Clinton however caught fire, burned to the water's edge, and sank. Loss to the owners of the Clinton, Capt. James D. Miller, John T. Apperson, and others, was about $6,000. Damage to the Relief was estimated to be about $500.

== Continued service on the upper Willamette ==
On Saturday, December 29, 1861, Relief arrived at Eugene City, with Captain Cochrane in charge. The last day, Sunday December 30, Relief made what was described as the “pioneer trip” to Springfield, with many of the townsfolk of Eugene on board. The return from Springfield to Eugene, a distance of five miles, was completed in 26 minutes. Relief loaded about 13 tons of freight at Springfield and 17 tons from Eugene City.

On March 28, 1862, Relief, still running under John W. Cochran, arrived at Eugene City with 8 tons of freight, and was scheduled to depart the next day with 40 tons of cargo from the local merchants.

On Saturday, February 28, 1863, Relief arrived at Eugene for the second time that winter, having taken three days on the trip from Oregon City. With the water in the river falling fast, Relief loaded some freight and returned downstream the same day.

Relief eventually came under the control of the People's Transportation Company, which, by the mid-1860s had a near-monopoly on transport on the Willamette River.

== Disposition ==
Relief was dismantled at Canemah, Oregon in 1865.
