= Upper Willamette Transportation Line =

Steamboat transportation line in Oregon, USA

Upper Willamette Transportation Company
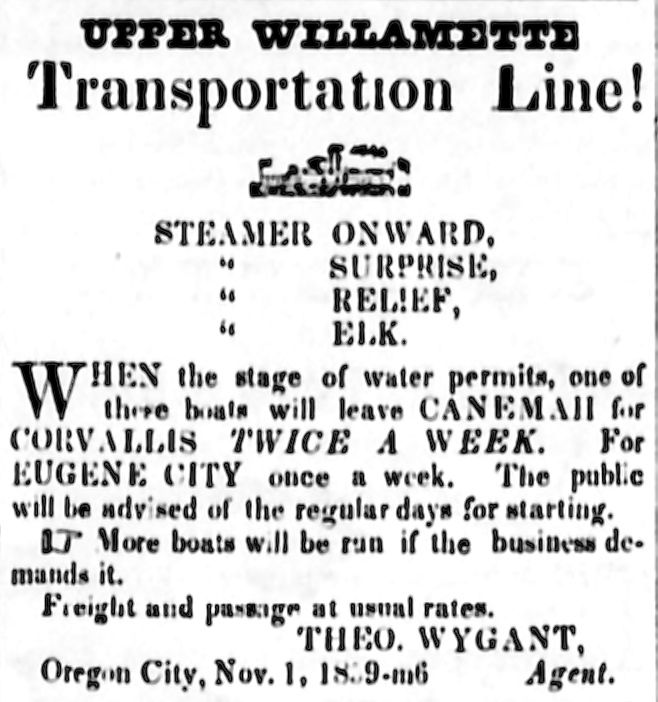
- Industry: river transport
- Founded: November 1, 1859
- Founder: Theodore Wygant (1831-1905)
- Defunct: June 30, 1860
- Headquarters: Oregon City, Oregon
- Area served: Upper Willamette River

The Upper Willamette Transportation Line was a line of four inland steamboats that operated from the fall of 1859 to the summer of 1860 on the upper Willamette River in the state of Oregon, United States.

== Operations ==
As of November 1, 1859, businessman Theodore Wygant (1831-1905) was the agent in Portland, Oregon for the steamers Elk, Onward, Surprise, and Relief. Wygant formed these steamers into the Upper Willamette Transportation Company, and starting November 19, 1859, advertised, stage of water permitting, steamers of the line would depart for Corvallis twice a week, and, for Eugene City, once a week. This arrangement was advertised until June 30, 1860.

In 1860, the steamers of the line were competing against two powerful companies on the Willamette River, the Oregon Steam Navigation Company and the People's Transportation Company.

== Steamers of the line ==
All vessels of the line were wooden-hulled sternwheelers, built in the 1850s at Canemah, Oregon.

- Elk, built 1857, destroyed by boiler explosion at Davidson’s Landing, near present day Dundee, Oregon, on November 17, 1860.
- Onward, built 1858 for Archibald "Archie" Jamieson (d.1861), later came under control of the Oregon Steam Navigation Company, then transferred to the People's Transportation Company in 1864, dismantled 1865 at Canemah. Engines to Fannie Patton. (Not to be confused with later Onward built 1867.)
- Relief, built 1858 at Oregon City for Cassidy & Co. Dismantled 1865 at Canemah.
- Surprise, built 1857, laid up 1864.
