= Fannie Patton =

Former American steamboat

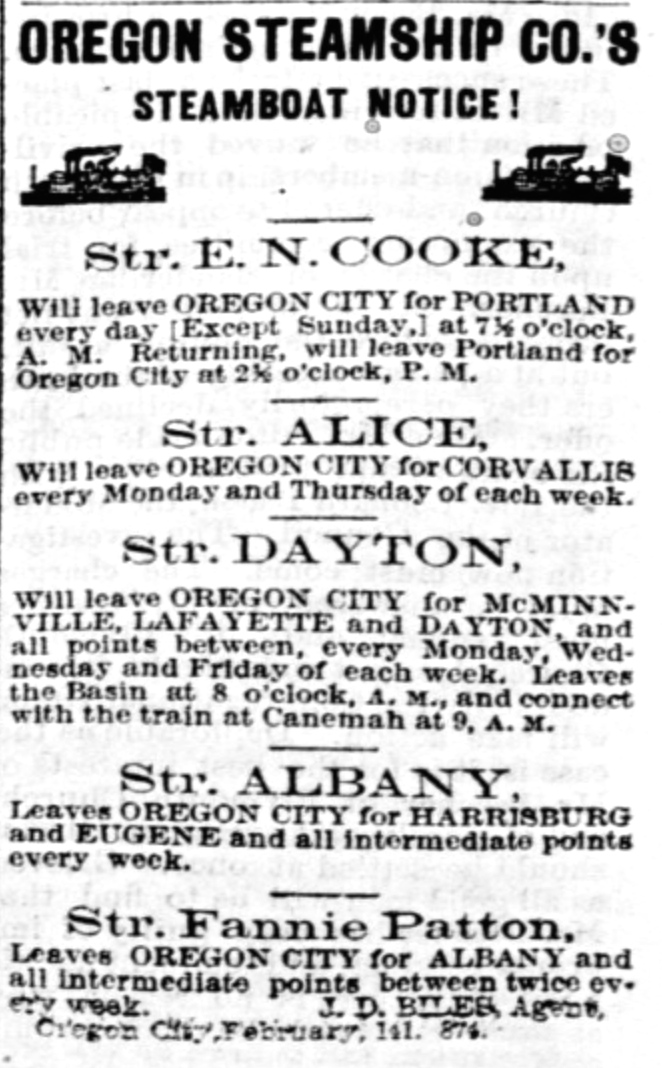
- Advertisement for Fannie Patton and other boats of the Oregon Steamship Company, published July 24, 1874

History
- Name: Fannie Patton
- Owner: People's Transportation Co.; Oregon Steamship Co.
- Builder: John T. Thomas
- Launched: August 25, 1865
- Out of service: 1880
- Fate: Dismantled and converted to barge
- Notes: Engines to Lake Pend Oreille steamer Henry Villard.

General characteristics
- Type: inland steamship
- Tonnage: 368
- Length: As built: 131 ft (39.9 m), and after reconstruction in 1874, 150 ft (45.7 m)
- Beam: 26 ft (7.9 m)
- Draft: 15 inches (unladen)
- Depth: 5 ft (2 m) depth of hold
- Installed power: twin horizontally mounted steam engines
- Propulsion: stern-wheel

Fanny Patton was a stern-wheel driven steamboat that operated on the Willamette River, in Oregon, starting in August 1865. This steamer operated from 1865 to 1880 for various owners, and was a considered a profitable vessel. The steamer was named for the daughter of businessman Edwin N Cook, Frances Mary "Fannie" Cooke (1837–1886). Edwin N. Cook was one of the principals of the People's Transportation Company.

== Construction ==
Fannie Patton was built at Canemah, Oregon, a location on the east side of the Willamette River, a short distance upstream from Willamette Falls. The boat was built for the People’s Transportation Company and launched on August 25, 1865. The builder was John T. Thomas (1808–1882).

== Machinery ==
The machinery for Fannie Patton came from the dismantled steamer Onward. The boat was driven by two horizontally mounted single-cylinder steam engines. Each cylinder had a bore of 17 (or 16) inches, with a piston stroke of 60 inches. The engines generated 74 nominal horsepower.

== Design ==
Fannie Patton was built to handle extreme low water conditions in the upper Willamette River, drawing only 15 inches of water when unloaded.

== Dimensions ==
According to one source, Fannie Patton was 150 ft (45.7 m) feet long, measured over the hull only, and excluding the extension of the main deck over the stern, called the "fantail", on which the stern-wheel was mounted. The beam was 26 ft (7.9 m) feet and depth of hold was 5 ft (1.5 m) feet. According to another source, Fannie Patton’s dimensions were 131 feet length, 26.5 feet beam, and 4 feet depth of hold.

According to one source, the tonnage of the vessel was 368 tons, which is a measure of size and not weight. The official steamboat registry number was 9615. According to another source, the vessel measured out at 298 tons.

== Ownership ==
Fannie Patton was originally built and owned by the People’s Transportation Company.

In 1874, Fannie Patton came under the control of the Oregon Steamship Company, a Ben Holladay concern, which had four other river boats, E.N. Cooke, Alice, Dayton, and Albany. As of February 1, 1874, and continuing for some time thereafter, all five of these boats operated out of Oregon City, with Fannie Patton running for Albany and intermediate points twice every week. John D. Biles was the Oregon City agent for all five steamers.

In April 1877, Bernard "Barney" Goldsmith and J.N. Teal were reported to have sold their interest in the Willamette Transportation and Locks Company to Henry W. Corbett and Henry Failing. Fannie Patton was among a number steamboats and other assets that changed hands in the transaction. The Oregon Steam Navigation Company still kept its controlling interest in the Willamette Locks and Transportation concern.

By 1879, Fannie Patton had come under the control of the Oregon Steam Navigation Company. In 1880 it was sold to the newly formed Oregon Railway and Navigation Company along with all the other assets of O.S.N.

== Operations ==
As of December 15, 1866, Fannie Patton was operating on the upper Willamette River, running from Oregon City every Tuesday and Friday for Corvallis, Oregon. Fannie Patton was reported to have done a very profitable business on the upper Willamette River.

On Monday, January 14, 1867, Fannie Patton was reported to have arrived in the boat basin at Oregon City "loaded to the guards", that is, so heavily laden that the protective timbers around the edges of the hull, called "guards" were at water level.

On Thursday March 26, 1868, the Oregon City delegates to the Union Party convention in Salem returned to Oregon City on board the Fannie Patton. The convention had nominated David Logan for the Union Party’s nominee for Oregon’s seat in Congress, as well as other candidates, including the slate of electors for Ulysses S. Grant, the party’s nominee for the presidency. Upon return to Oregon City on the Fannie Patton, the conventioneers were greeted with cheers by a crowd on the wharf, as well as an escort from the Oregon City Brass Band.

On December 30, 1868, J.H. Foster & Co. of Magnolia Mills in Albany, shipped out on Fannie Patton the largest single lot shipment of flour every sent out from Albany. The shipment consisted of 4,400 sacks of flour, the equivalent of 1,100 barrels. The flour mills were then reported to be running "night and day.".

On Sunday, May 7, 1870, Fannie Patton was scheduled to carry an excursion from Albany to Corvallis for the benefit of the Albany fire company. The "magnificent steamer" Fannie Patton was scheduled to depart Albany at 7:30 a.m. and, returning, leave from Corvallis at 2:30 p.m. The Albany fire company was to take along their fire engine to make a demonstration in Corvallis. Tickets were 50 cents for adults, and free for children under 12, with the Albany Brass Band coming along.

In late June 1870, a newspaper reported that Fannie Patton was to be brought into drydock for the purpose of lengthening the steamer’s hull, so that upon completion of the work, the boat would be 150 feet long.

On Monday, February 17, 1873, Fannie Patton brought upriver to Corvallis thirty-eight cases of oil and other lighthouse supplies for the Yaquina Head Lighthouse, then under construction, and known as the Cape Foulweather Lighthouse. These supplies were transported overland to Elk City, Oregon, in Lincoln County on the Yaquina River, starting with one shipment on Thursday, February 20, 1873, hauled by drovers Hamlin and Stanford, and with the rest scheduled to be transported on Saturday, February 22, by Brown and Emrick.

In late January 1876, Fannie Patton raced upriver against its competitor, the City of Salem from Salem to Albany. The engineer of Fannie Patton disputed claims that the City of Salem won the race, stating that the rival vessel had departed Salem twenty minutes early, but Fannie Patton still caught up, and would have passed the City of Salem but for the fact that the City of Salem locked sides with Fannie Patton. According to the engineer, City of Salem was only able to reach Albany first because Fannie Patton had had to stop at Independence, Oregon along the way.

On Tuesday, November 28, 1876, Fannie Patton was the first steamboat of the winter navigation season to reach Lafayette, Oregon, on the Yamhill River, where its arrival was greeted enthusiastically by the residents of the town.

== Crew and incidents ==
The first captain of Fannie Patton, in 1865, was George Jerome, who, according to one source, remained in charge for most of the boat’s career. For a few years George A. Pease and James D. Miller were in charge.

The well-known river man Sherman V. Short (1856–1915) began his career as a deckhand on the Fannie Patton.

On Wednesday, June 18, 1873, a crewman on Fannie Patton, Norman Warner, aged 16, was drowned when he had tried to draw water from the river using a bucket. The bucket pulled the boy into the water, and although he swam for a while, he eventually went under the water before the boat could be stopped or help rendered. The drowning was reported to have occurred near Champoeg, Oregon. The body was not recovered for two weeks, when it was found floating in the water at Butteville The steamer Governor Grover carried the body upriver to Salem.

Lucien E. Pratt (1824–1899), a director of the People’s Transportation Company, was also a captain of Fannie Patton. In December 1873, Pratt was reported to have been placed in charge of Fannie Patton. A newspaper of the time described Pratt as "one of the oldest, as well as most popular steamboatmen on the Willamette." Pratt was in command when, in 1874, the steamer Shoshone sank in the Willamette River and Fannie Patton rescued the Shoshone’s passengers. According to one steamboatman’s reminiscences 15 years later, Fannie Patton had been racing with Shoshone, during which Shoshone ran into a snag, causing the sinking.

== Early criticism ==
In December 1866, Martin H. Abbott, editor of the State Rights Democrat, an Albany newspaper, and an opponent of the People’s Transportation Company, criticized the meal service on board Fanny Patton, stating, in part, as follows:

… when we pay four bits for a meal, we do expect to have something near its equivalent set before us, whether we partake of it or not; and having been but recently engaged in the hotel business, we claim to know what a meal should be for which half a dollar is charged. The breakfast furnished us, to which we have above alluded, consisted of a piece of very tough beaf, cooked till it was dry and quite tasteless. We set it aside. The coffee was black as tar-water, nearly cold and without milk.

== Disposition ==
In August 1880 the useful components of the steamer were stripped out and the vessel was converted to a barge. In March 1881, Col. William S. Button, of Roseburg, Oregon was supervising the removal of the machinery of the Fannie Patton so that it could be installed in the Lake Pend Oreille steamer Henry Villard.
