= Canemah =

Canemah may refer to:

- Canemah, Oregon an early settlement in Oregon, United States, now part of Oregon City
- Canemah (sidewheeler), a steamboat named after the town in Oregon
