= Elk (1857 sternwheeler) =

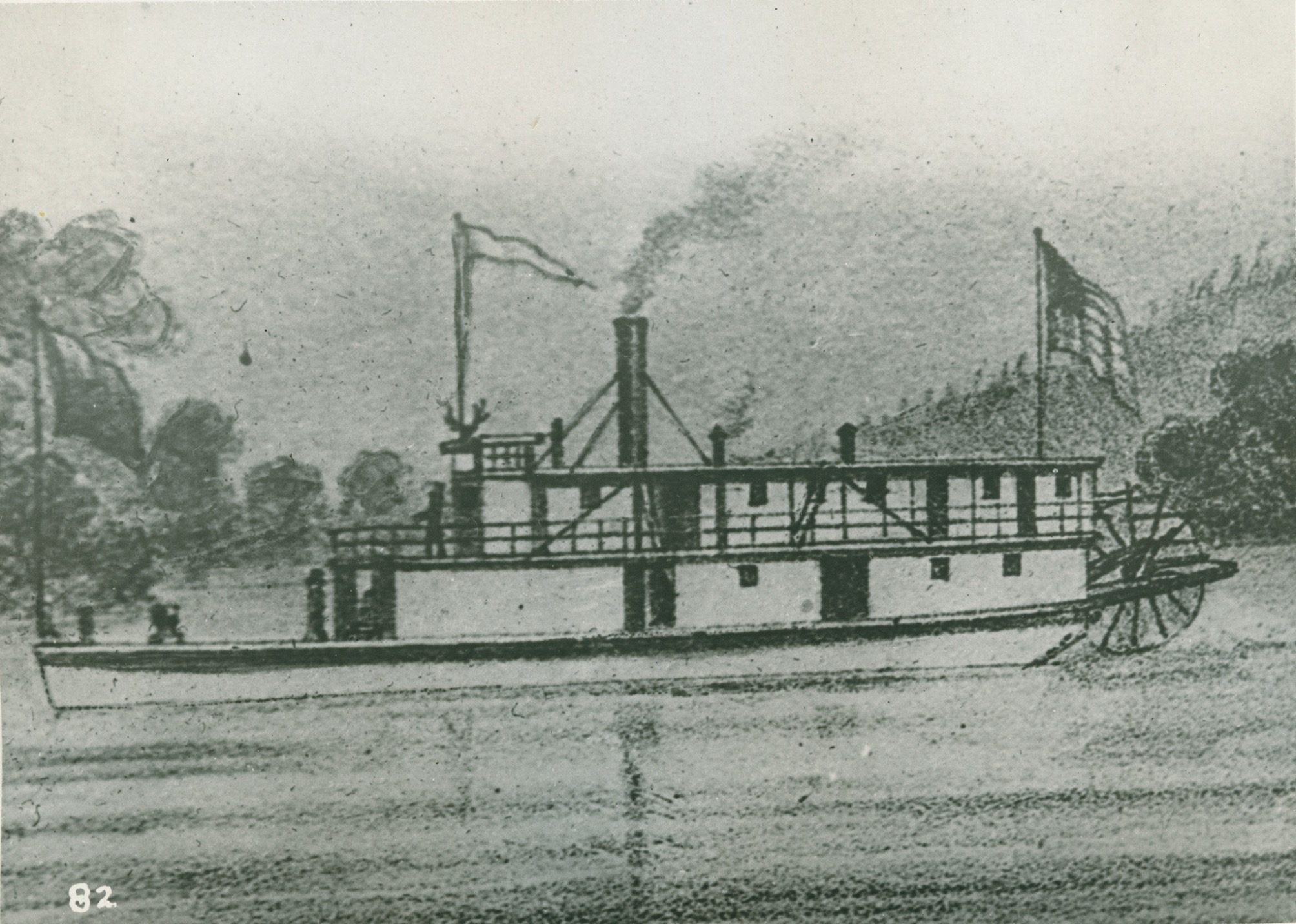
- Elk

History
- Name: Elk
- Owner: George A. Pease, François X. Matthieu, and others
- Operator: Upper Willamette River Transportation Line
- Route: Upper Willamette and lower Yamhill rivers
- Launched: September 8, 1857
- Out of service: November 17, 1860
- Fate: Destroyed by boiler explosion

General characteristics
- Type: inland steamship
- Length: 95 ft (29.0 m) exclusive of fantail
- Beam: 17.5 ft (5.3 m) exclusive of guards
- Depth: 4 ft (1.2 m) depth of hold
- Installed power: twin steam engines, single-cylinder, horizontally mounted, 10.5 in (26.7 cm) cylinder bore, 48 in (122 cm) piston stroke.
- Propulsion: sternwheel

Elk was a stern-wheel driven steamboat built on the Willamette River in 1857 at Canemah, Oregon. This steamboat is chiefly remembered for its destruction by a boiler explosion in which by good fortune no one was seriously hurt. A folklore tale later arose about this disaster.

== Construction and owners ==
Elk was built in 1857 at Canemah, Oregon by Capt. Christopher (or Christian) E. Sweitzer, François X. Matthieu, George A. Pease (1830-1919), and John Marshall Jacob Kamm also held a share of the vessel.

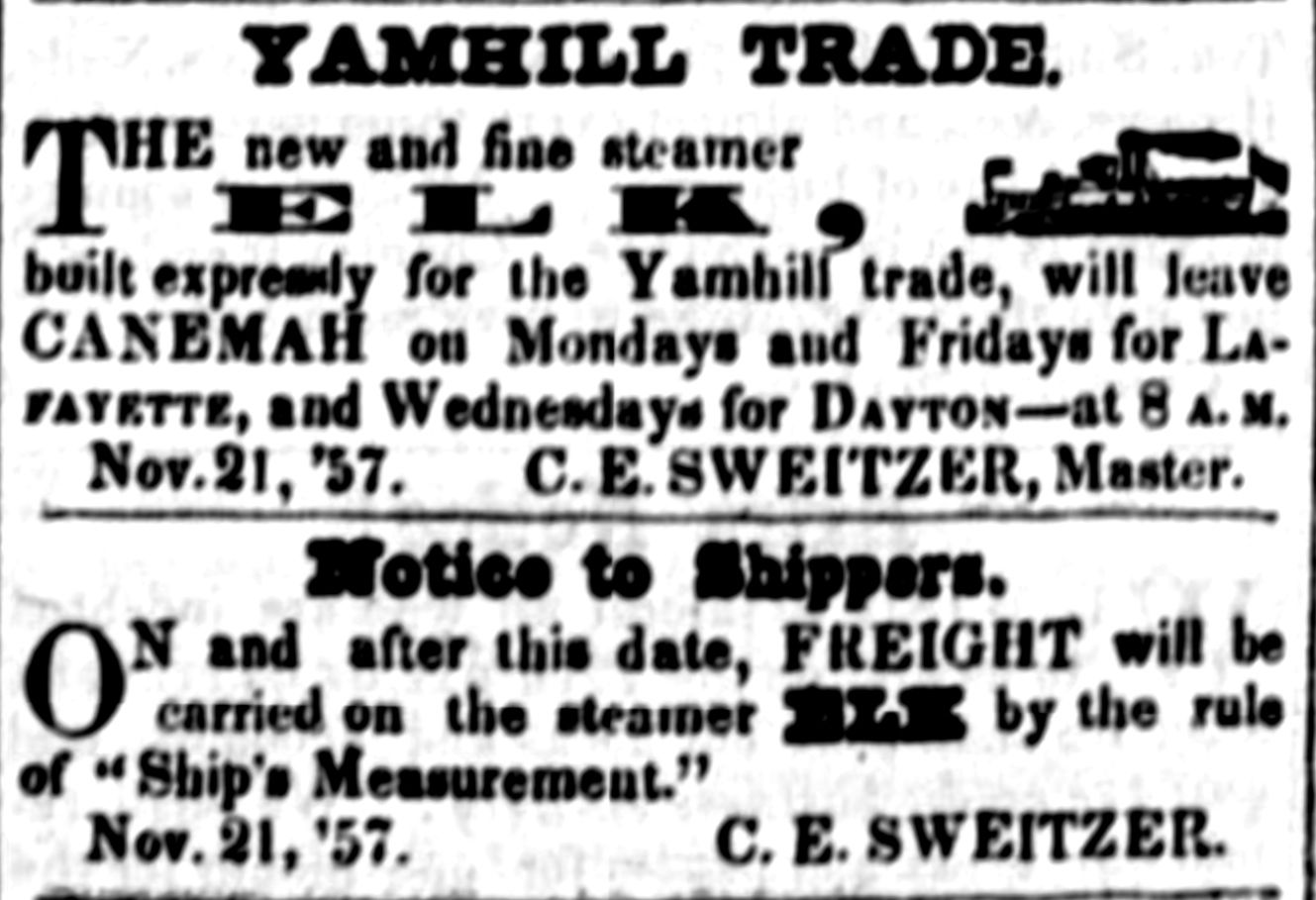
Advertisement for the new steamer Elk, placed October 16, 1858

== Construction ==
Elk was built for the Phoenix Company at Canemah, Oregon. Elk was launched on Tuesday, September 8, 1857. The steamer was expected to be complete in two or three weeks after launch.

Elk was built for the Butteville, Champoeg, and Yamhill River trade.

The hull was built by two men, Lambert and McCourt. The cabin was built by Christopher E. Sweitzer, who was also a part owner. Sweizter was an experienced steamboat man on the upper Willamette River who was expected to become the captain and pilot of the Elk.

== Dimensions and engineering ==
Elk was 95 feet (29 m) long, with a beam (width) of 17.5 feet (5.3 m). Elk was expected to be 60 tons burthen. Elk was expected to be able to carry 50 or 60 tons of cargo.

Elk was driven by twin steam engines, horizontally mounted. Each engine had a cylinder bore of 10.5 in (26.7 cm) and a piston stroke of 48 in (122 cm). The sternwheel was 16 feet (4.9 m) in diameter. The machinery was built by John Marshall or one Moore who were also part owners. Either Moore or Marshall was expected to become the engineer of the steamer when it was launched. Marshall did serve as engineer on Elk.

== Operations ==
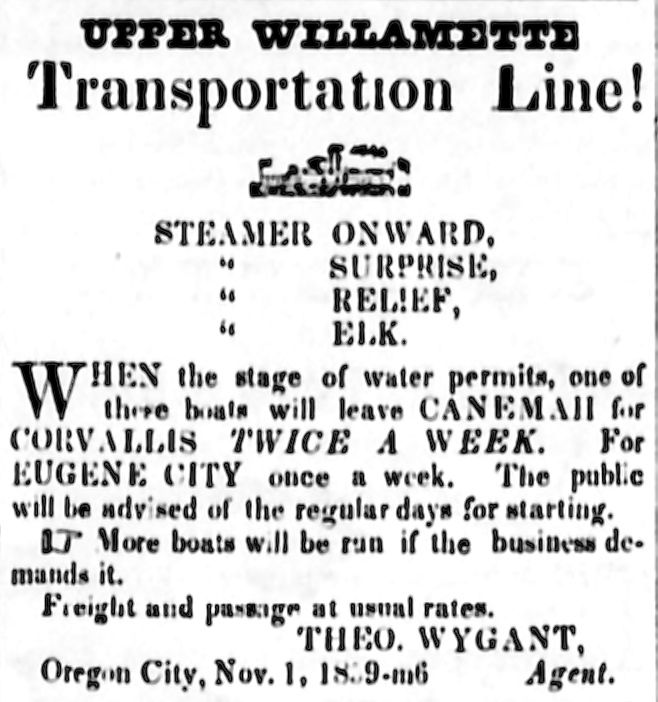
Advertisement for steamers of the Upper Willamette Transportation Line, placed January 21, 1860.

Elk made its trial trip from Canemah to Champoeg, Oregon on Thursday, October 8, 1857, covering the distance in 131 minutes. This was only five minutes less than the best time for the Enterprise, a sternwheeler built in 1855. Elk was received enthusiastically at Butteville, Oregon and Champoeg, with the local populace cheering and firing off cannons as the steamer reached each landing.

Leonard White, an early steamboat man who had a devotion to phonetic spelling, was apparently on board, as he wrote, under the pen name "Fonos" or "Fono", a description for The Oregon Argus, which began:

The nu Steamer cold the "Elk" mad hur furst trip up yesterday or Champoeg, and returned to day. She full kam up to ther most sangwin expectashuns in sped &c., having mad the best "triel trip time" that wos ever mad on the upper Wilamet.

As of October 24, 1857 Elk was making trips from Canemah to Champoeg, Oregon. Elk would be under the command of Captain Sweitzer. The owners planned to put Elk in the trade on the Yamhill River once the water rose.

As of November 1, 1859, businessman Theodore Wygant (1831-1905) was the Elk's agent in Portland, Oregon. Wygant was also agent at the same time for the steamers Onward, Surprise, and Relief. Wygant formed these steamers into the Upper Willamette Transportation Line, and starting November 19, 1859, advertised, stage of water permitting, steamers of the line would depart for Corvallis twice a week, and, for Eugene City, once a week. This arrangement was advertised until June 30, 1860.

In 1860, Elk was competing against two powerful companies on the Willamette River, the Oregon Steam Navigation Company and the People's Transportation Company.

== Boiler explosion ==
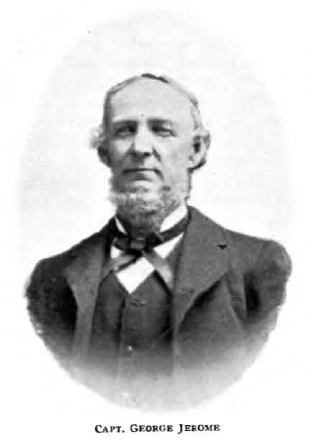
George Jerome, captain of the Elk at the time of the explosion.

On Saturday afternoon, November 17, 1860, Elk was destroyed by a boiler explosion. Reports that this occurred in 1857 or in 1861 are erroneous. The explosion occurred near Davidson's Landing, about one mile (1.6 km) below the mouth of the Yamhill River. Officers on board Elk at the time were George Jerome (1823–1886), captain, William Smith, engineer, Sebastian "Bas" Miller, pilot, and John Murray, steward. The entire upper works of the vessel disintegrated. Although there were some injuries, no one was killed.

Elk had been proceeding downriver, and had rounded in to Davidson’s to land a package, and was about to pull back into the stream, when the boiler exploded. Captain George Jerome, who had been on the wharf, from which he "blown some fifty feet into the air, enjoying a good view of the surrounding country through the tree-tops, and of the falling smokestack beneath him." Jerome landed, with only minor injuries, but "found things considerably smashed up on his return."

The steward, John Murray, was blown out into the river, but was rescued by a small boat. The most serious injury was to the fireman, whose left arm was badly hurt. There were only four passengers on board, all of whom were gathered around the stove in the after section of the cabin at the time of the explosion. Although they were blown off the boat with the cabin structure, they escaped unharmed.

No one was seriously hurt, but those who were injured were treated at the Davidson’s home, by Mrs. Davidson. The cargo, consisting principally of apples, was mostly lost. Total loss to the steamer’s owners was about $8,000.

== Folklore ==
Folklore records a story as a result of the explosion, Captain Jerome had been blown so high into the air, that he could look down the ship's chimney, also flying through the air, and see pilot Bas Miller lying dazed on the river bank where the explosion had left him. Jerome was said to have landed in a cottonwood tree.

It was said that for twenty years afterwards pilots and crew on steamboats on the river pointed out this particular tree to passengers, but Captain Jerome never did so, in the interest of maintaining his dignity.
