= Oregon (1852 sidewheeler) =

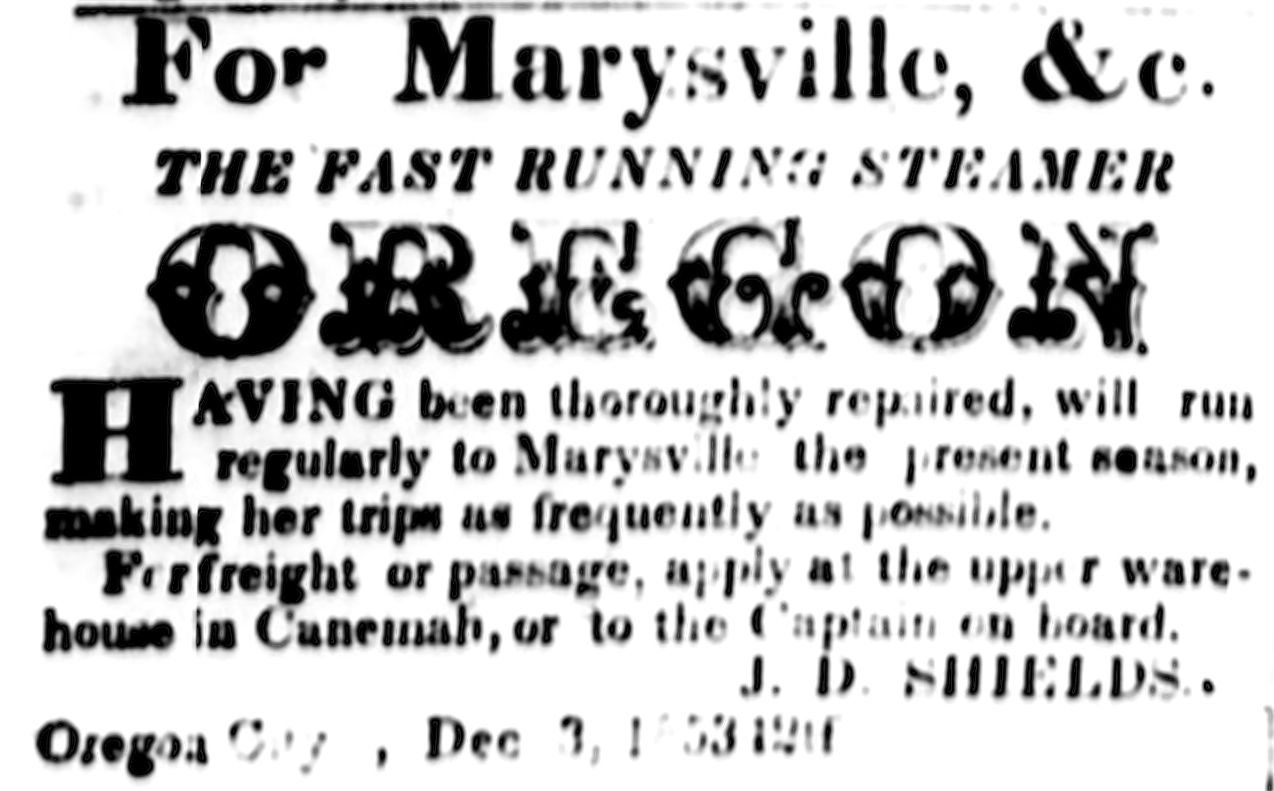
- Advertisement for Oregon, placed March 10, 1854

History
- Name: Oregon
- Owner: Ben Simpson and others
- Route: Upper Willamette River
- In service: 1852
- Out of service: 1854
- Fate: Sunk after striking snag, total loss

General characteristics
- Type: inland steamship
- Length: 120 ft (36.6 m) exclusive of fantail
- Beam: 22 ft (6.7 m) exclusive of guards
- Depth: 5 ft (2 m) depth of hold
- Installed power: steam engine
- Propulsion: side-wheel

Oregon was a side-wheel driven steamboat that operated on the Willamette River in the state of Oregon from 1852 to 1854. The steamer was not economically successful and became a total loss by sinking after a short career.

== Construction ==
Oregon was built at Fairfield, Oregon in the summer of 1852. Fairfield was located 16 miles (26 km) downstream from Salem, Oregon, and was once one of the most important wheat shipping points on the Willamette River. Ben Simpson, the held of the original ownership syndicate, was also the builder. Construction was supervised in the summer of 1852 by George A. Pease (1830–1918).

Oregon was 120 feet long. The beam (width) of the steamer was 22 feet (6.7 m), probably exclusive of the guards. The depth of hold was 5 feet.

Oregon was described as a small sidewheeler and a poor money earner.

== Operations ==
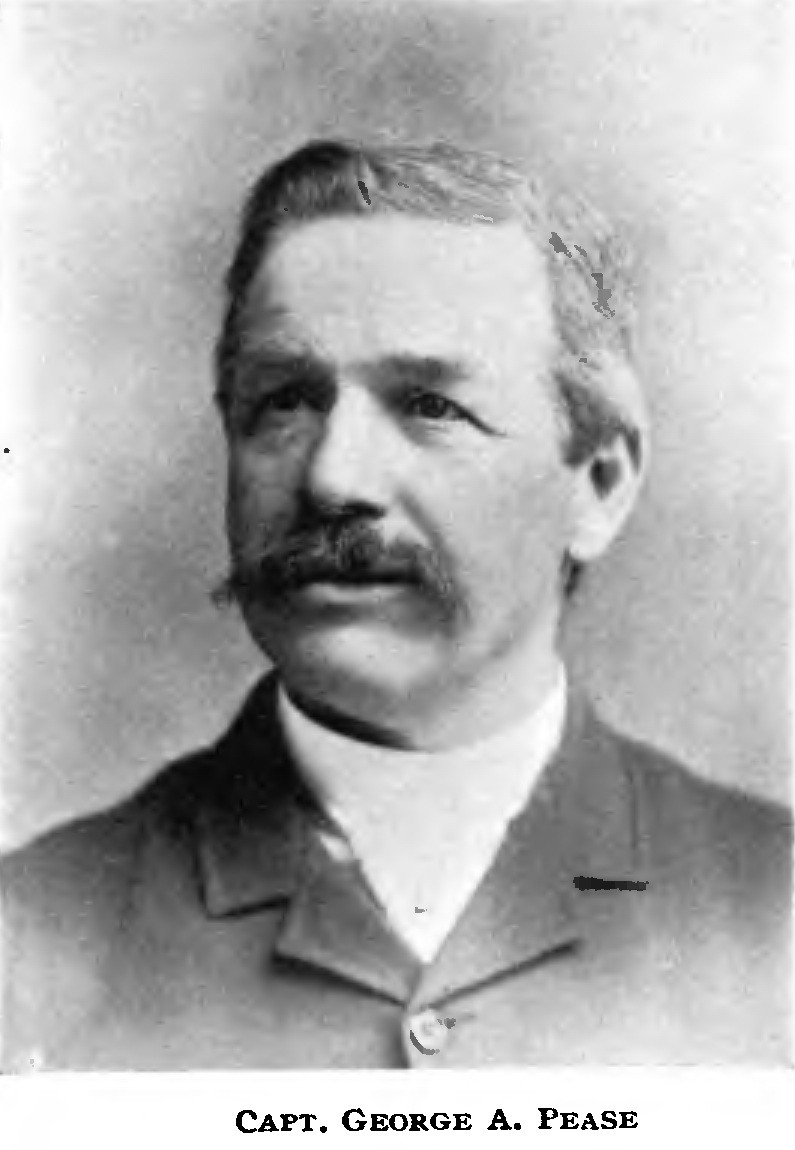
George A. Pease (1830–1919), first pilot of the Oregon.

Upon completion, Parker and J.D. Shields served as captains. George A. Pease was the pilot of the Oregon until July 1853. Another report states that Jacob Wortman, later president of the First National Bank of McMinnville, was the captain of Oregon, starting in 1853. Fare from Oregon City to Corvallis, Oregon was then $30 for a trip.

Starting on December 3, 1853, the "fast running steamer" Oregon was advertised as making regular runs from Oregon to Marysville, as Corvallis was then known, and way landings.

On March 4, 1854, the steamer Oregon was reported to have been purchased by the Willamette Falls Mill and Transport Company, sometimes referred to as the Willamette Falls Company.

On March 17, 1854, the Willamette Falls Company placed into service a new steamer, the side-wheeler Gazelle, giving the company, briefly, two steamers operating above Willamette Falls.

== Loss ==
Shortly after Gazelle was placed in operation, Oregon was sunk and became a total loss. Oregon hit a snag just down river from Salem, and began sinking. Word was passed to Gazelle, which steamed upriver and stood by as Oregon was filling with water.

Cargo from the Oregon was loaded onto Gazelle to lighten Oregon to better allow salvaging. Suddenly Oregon broke free of the snag, drifted downstream, ran up on a sandbar and sank so deeply that only a part of the upper works were visible above the water. Oregon was a total loss.

Gazelle itself was destroyed by a boiler explosion only a short time later, on April 8, 1854, ending the brief steamboat operations of the Willamette Falls Company
