= George Anson Pease =

American steamboat captain and river navigator

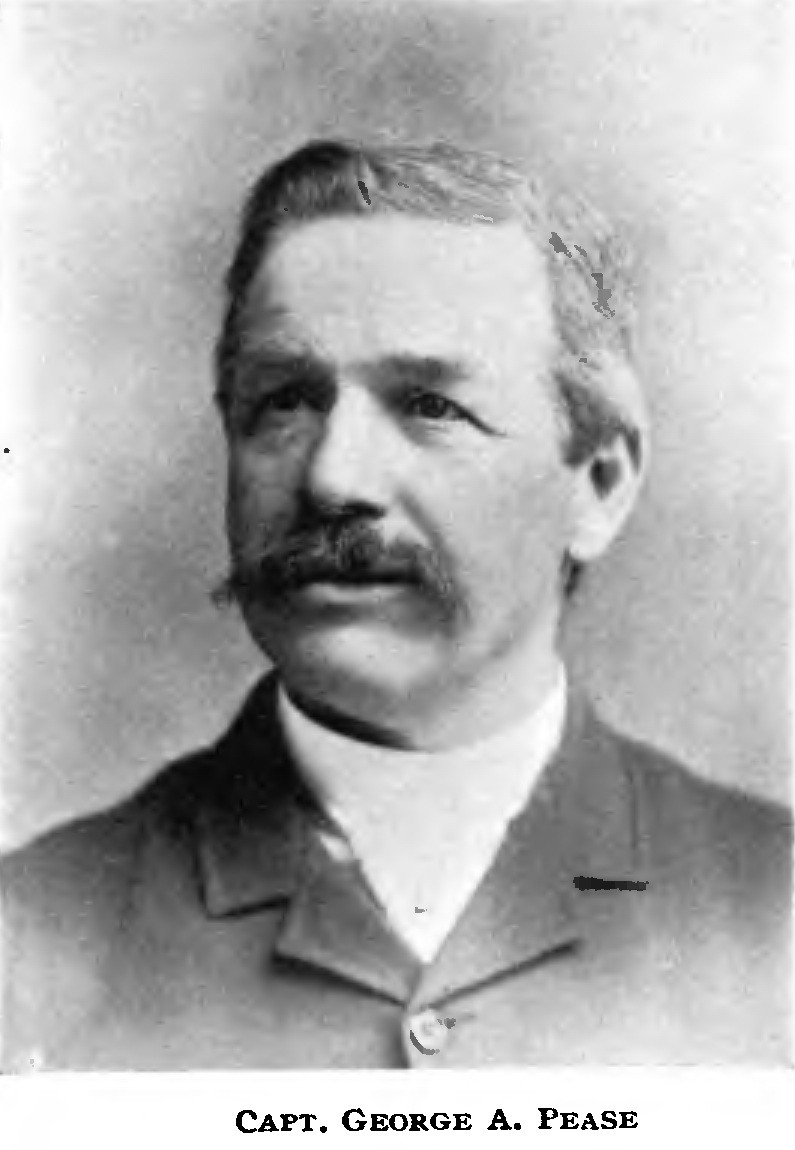
- Born: September 30, 1830; Stuyvesant Landing, Columbia County, New York State, US
- Died: January 22, 1919 (aged 88); Portland, Oregon, US
- Known for: River navigation
- Political party: Republican
- Spouse: Mildred A. Moore
- Children: 4

George Anson Pease (September 30, 1830 – January 22, 1919) was a steamboat captain in the Pacific Northwest region on the United States, who was active from the earliest days of steamboat navigation on the Willamette River in the 1850s. He worked in various roles until the early 1900s, commanding numerous vessels during that time. During a flood in 1861, while in command of the sternwheeler Onward, Pease rescued 40 people from a flood in the area of Salem, Oregon.

== Family ==
George Anson Pease was born at Stuyvesant Landing, Columbia County, New York State, on September 30, 1830. His father was Norman Pease (b. 1805; d. Jan 4, 1847, age 43), who was an architect and builder in New York State. His mother was Harriet McAllister, who moved to Oregon in 1862 from New York, and who died in 1890, at Oregon City, Oregon, at the age of 90 years.

Pease, the oldest of the family, had six siblings, one of whom died in infancy. The others, all sisters, were:

- Maria A. Pease, who married Alexander Warner; as of 1904 resided in the Mount Tabor neighborhood of Portland, Oregon.
- Martha E. Pease, who married John Howser, was living in Portland in 1890, but by 1904 she was widowed and living in New York City.
- Jane Pease, who married A. M. Cannon and who died in Spokane Falls, Washington, in 1893.
- Harriet E. Pease, who married Capt. Charles W. Pope (1831–1871).
- Pamela Pease, who married Alfred Herring and who died in Portland in 1887.

== Education and training ==
Pease and his sisters were all educated in the subscription schools of New York State. At age fifteen he started working with his father to learn the carpenter and joiner's trade. When his father died, in 1847, Pease completed his apprenticeship with another man.

== Move to California ==
In 1849, news of the California Gold Rush induced Pease to go to the west, by way of a ship around Cape Horn. Pease arrived on September 30, 1849. Pease worked in the mines for a while, where he achieved some success in the following winter, but he was cheated by his partner, and ended up with nothing.

== Relocation to Oregon ==
Pease then went north to the Oregon Territory, arriving July, 1850 on the brig Annie E. Maine, crossing the Columbia River bar on July 21.

Pease bought a pair of flatboats and ran them on the Willamette River from Milwaukie, Oregon, to Oregon City and later from Portland. Pease began in a keel-boat in 1850, taking freight from Portland to Oregon City for $20 a ton. The boat was propelled by Native Americans with poles, oars and sails.

== Steamboat career ==
When in 1851, the first steamboat, the sidewheeler Canemah was brought to the upper Willamette River, Pease became a deckhand and a clerk on the vessel for six months. He also served on the early Willamette steamers Hoosier, Oregon, and Franklin.

In the summer of 1852, Pease supervised the construction of the sidewheeler Oregon, at Fairfield Landing, on the Willamette River.

Elk was built in 1857 at Canemah, Oregon, by Capt. Christian E. Sweitzer, François X. Matthieu, George A. Pease, and John Marshall

In 1858, with others Pease bought Elk, and, in 1860, Onward

In 1860 Pease help build, and owned five-ninths, of the steamer Enterprise. Pease ran Enterprise for two years and placed it into the People's Transportation Company, which had been organized in 1862.

Also in 1860, Rival was built at Oregon City, Oregon, by William and John Dement, two brothers who were merchants in Oregon City, and Capt. George A. Pease, who became her first captain.

During the great flood of the Willamette River in November and December 1861, which among other things destroyed Champoeg and Linn City the steamer Onward, under Captain Pease, was able to run through the streets of Salem to rescue people. For Onward this started out as a routine upriver journey from Canemah. The river was cluttered with debris from riverside houses and landings that had been washed downstream by the flood. By the time Onward reached Salem, her ordinary commercial operation turned into one of rescuing people from the flooded city.

In 1863, Pease built a new independent steamer, also named Enterprise, at Canemah, Oregon. Pease was backed by a company formed by his brother in law, Capt. Charles. W. Pope (1831–1871), Capt. Nat H. Lane Sr. (1823–1878), C. Friendly, Judge Riley E. Stratton, C. Crawford, James Wilson, C.W. Rea, and S. Ellsworth. The new Enterprise was launched in November 1863, and ran independently for a short time under Pease.

Pease become connected with the People's Transportation Company in 1865. For some years the captain was a member of the board of directors, but in 1871, all the assets of the P.T. Company were sold to Benjamin Holladay Pease remained in his employ as superintendent of Holladay's river lines. Pease also supervised for Holladay the construction of large hotel at Clatsop Beach, in 1872.

Holladay afterward sold out to the Oregon Steam Navigation Company. Pease stayed on as a captain for O.S.N. In 1875 Pease ran Bonita from Portland to Astoria, Oregon, for O.S.N. After this he ran Dixie Thompson and Emma Hayward for O.S.N. until 1878 or 1879, when he resigned and became a pilot.

== Piloting career ==
In 1888 a law was passed which provided that a ship need not take a pilot if it accepted a tow. The law resulted in giving the towing on the Columbia River to the Union Pacific Railroad Company. Pease was the only state-licensed pilot in their employ. After some years Pease went to work for the Oregon Railroad and Navigation Company.

In March 1889, the pilots and engineers of the Oregon Railway & Navigation company went on strike for higher wages. On Friday, March 8, 1889, the pilots and the engineers appointed three men each to negotiate with the company, with George Pease being one of men selected by the pilots.

In 1896 Pease was appointed captain of the United States government dredge. W. S. Ladd, and remained until May. 1903, when he resigned and quit active work.

== Mining and prospecting ==
In 1855 Pease went out on a gold prospecting expedition with 25 other men. While they were out the Indian war broke out. Pease owned some mines in Idaho.

== Marriage and children ==
In Linn City, Oregon, on December 26, 1857, Pease was married to Mildred A. Moore. Moore had been born in Illinois and been brought to Oregon with her family when she was five years old.

Mildred A. Moore died in Portland on October 22, 1879., at the age thirty-seven years. The couple had four children, of whom two died as children, Francis A. Pease, age six, and George E. Pease, age two.

The two children who survived were Archibald Leon Pease (1858–1919) and Harriet M. Pease Colbert (1861–1948), both of whom were married and had children as of 1904. Archibald L. Pease was also a steamboat captain, who, in 1893 was the master of the side-wheeler T.J. Potter, one of the most famous steamboats to operate on the Columbia River.

== Fraternal, social and business associations ==
Pease became a Mason in 1855, in Oregon City, and acted as master of Multnomah Lodge, which was the oldest on the Pacific coast. Pease was a charter member of Portland Masonic Lodge No. 55, and was a Royal Arch Mason, a charter member and Thirty-Second Degree Mason of the Scottish Rite and a member of the Al Kader Temple.

Pease was also a member of the Odd Fellows, being in 1857 secretary of Oregon Lodge No. 3, I.O.O.F.

Pease also belonged to the Pioneers' Association of Oregon and Historical Society, the Masters and Pilots' Association of United States Steam Vessels, and of the American Brotherhood of Steamboat Captains and Pilots.

== Political affiliation ==
Pease was a Republican and was at one time a member of the Oregon City Council. Pease was strongly pro-Union during the American Civil War. On Tuesday, June 11, 1861, in command of Onward, he carried a pro-Union crowd upriver to a large Union rally at Corvallis, Oregon, with the trip from Canemah taking two days.

Around the state in the summer of 1861, flag poles were being set up in various towns, on which the national colors were hoisted. Confederate sympathizers in Oregon, referred to derogatorily as "secesh" by opposing Unionists, occasionally replaced the flag of the Union with that of the Confederacy. At the now-vanished town of Linn City, Oregon, on Monday, July 1, 1861, Pease and fellow steamboat captain James D. Miller led a group of pro-Union citizens in raising a 132 ft (40.2 m) flag pole, at the top of which was placed a Union flag made by the women of the city.

== Death ==
Pease died on January 22, 1919, in Portland, Oregon, at his residence at 784 Pettigrove Street. Interment was at the Mountain View Cemetery in Oregon City.

== Vessels commanded, built, or piloted ==
The following is a non-exclusive list of vessels owned (in whole or in part) commanded, built or piloted by George A. Pease. All were sternwheel river steamers, except as stated:

- Active.
- Alert
- Bonita (1875).
- Canemah (sidewheeler)
- Dixie Thompson.
- Elk
- E.N. Cooke.
- Emma Hayward.
- Enterprise (1860)
- Enterprise (1863)
- Onward (1858)
- Oregon (sidewheeler 1852)
- Pioneer, steam tug.
- Rival
- Senator.
- Success.
- Welcome.
