= Relief (1906 sternwheeler) =

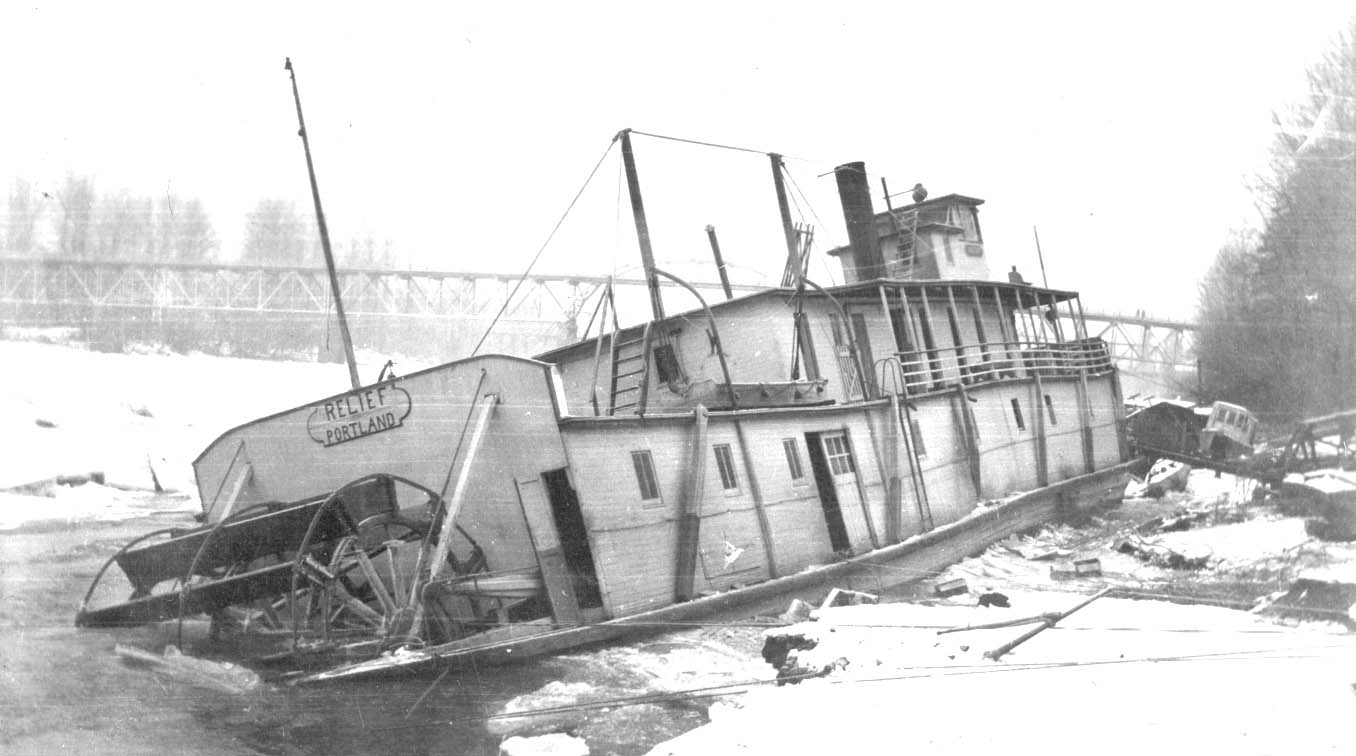
- Relief crushed in ice, at Salem, winter of 1924–25

History
- Name: Relief
- Owner: Open River Trans. Co., and others
- Port of registry: Portland, Oregon
- In service: 1906
- Out of service: 1931
- Identification: U.S. 203513
- Fate: Abandoned 1931

General characteristics
- Type: Inland passenger/freight
- Tonnage: 214 GRT; 209 NRT
- Length: 117.5 ft (35.81 m)
- Beam: 22.5 ft (6.86 m)
- Depth of hold: 4.7 ft (1.43 m)
- Installed power: twin single-cylinder steam engines, 150 indicated horsepower
- Propulsion: stern-wheel
- Capacity: 75 tons
- Crew: eleven (11)

Relief was a stern-wheel steamboat that operated on the Columbia and Willamette rivers and their tributaries from 1906 to 1931. Relief had been originally built in 1902, on the Columbia at Blalock, Oregon, in Gilliam County, and launched and operated as Columbia, a much smaller vessel. Relief was used primarily as a freight carrier, first for about ten years in the Inland Empire region of Oregon and Washington, hauling wheat and fruit, and after that was operated on the lower Columbia river.

After 1918 the owners of Relief struggled to find cargo, as railroads and especially highway transport cut sharply into the steamboat share of the transport business. Relief was seriously damaged in a sinking in late 1924, but was eventually raised, and returned to service for some time. Relief was abandoned in 1931.

== Route ==
=== Rapids and portages ===
In its natural state, the Columbia river had a many rapids and narrows which impeded navigation. Moving upstream, at river mile 146.5 were the Cascades Rapids, which were impassable upstream. Next came Celilo Falls, also known as The Dalles, which were a series of rapids, eddies, and chutes running between river miles 188 and 200. Between river mile 200 and the mouth of the Snake River, at river mile 325, the Umatilla Rapids were the most significant barrier to steamboat navigation.

The river below the Cascades was called the Lower Columbia. Between the Cascades and The Dalles was the Middle Columbia. Upstream from The Dalles was called the Upper Columbia. Steamboats could not move upstream (except in rare cases by lining) through either Celilo Falls or the Cascades. In favorable conditions, steamboats could be taken down through the rapids.

Starting in the 1850s, portage railroads, first drawn by mules, and then by steam locomotives, were built around both sets of rapids. In 1896 the Cascades Locks and Canal were completed, which effectively joined the lower and middle river for navigation. The portage railroad around Celilo Falls remained the only way to move steamboat cargo from the upper to the lower Columbia.

=== Railroad competition ===
Railroads and steamboats often competed for business. There once had been steamboats operating on the upper Columbia river, but by 1883, railroad competition had been so successful that all river boats had been driven off the route. Wheat farming became widespread in the region in the 1880s and 1890s, and the railroads could not handle the larger and larger wheat crops being produced. The Open River Navigation company was formed to meet the demands for transport by wheat farmers and shippers, and it built a number of steamers, including Relief.

== Construction ==
Relief was rebuilt from the much smaller stern-wheel steamer Columbia (US registry 127689), which had been 77 ft (23.47 m) feet long, 20.4 ft (6.22 m) on the beam, with a depth of hold of 3.6 ft (1.10 m) feet. The overall size of Columbia had been much smaller than Relief, at 80 gross tons and 40 net tons, with tons being a unit of volume and not weight in this instance.

On August 31, 1906, the Morning Oregonian reported Capt. Frank J. Smith, transportation superintendent of the Open River Company, would leave the next evening to prepare for the opening of the grain shipping season, and would also likely be attending the launching of Relief, then under construction, at Blalock, Oregon. Relief was launched on Tuesday, September 11, 1906.

As built, Relief was 117.5 ft (35.81 m) long, with a beam of 22.5 ft (6.86 m), and depth of hold of 4.7 ft (1.43 m). The overall size of the vessel was 214 gross ton and 209 net tons, with ton in this instance being a measure of volume, and not weight. The power plant was rated at 150 indicated horsepower. The crew size was eleven (11). The merchant vessel registry number was 203513. Relief was reported to have had a 75-ton cargo carrying capacity.

As built, Relief burned cordwood as fuel for its boiler. In April 1907, newspapers reported that work was in progress to convert Relief to an oil-fired steam plant. In April 1907, the Open River company selected Archie Geer to be captain of Relief, and Capt. William R. Thomas as pilot.

== Operations on the upper Columbia ==
On October 3, 1906, Relief made its first commercial run, from Squally Hook, on the Columbia River in Gilliam County, Oregon, to Celilo, carrying 1,500 bags of wheat. Once at Celilo, the wheat was transshipped around Celilo Falls on the portage railroad, to The Dalles, Oregon, where it was loaded on the sternwheeler Charles R. Spencer for further transport downriver.

Open River company superintendent Frank J. Smith was on board Relief, which was reported to have readily climbed rapids on the river, and to have made excellent time. In a possible contradiction, a newspaper report in 1907 stated that Relief could not ascend the Umatilla Rapids, upstream from the mouth of the Umatilla River and the town of Umatilla, Oregon. A non-contemporaneous authority states Relief lacked sufficient power to ascend the Umatilla rapids.

In mid-January 1907 ice jammed the Columbia so much so that it was possible, if dangerous, to walk across the river. The steamers Relief and Norma were tied up at Celilo, and protected from the ice by a log boom around the moorage.

In September 1907, a newspaper estimated Relief, running out of Umatilla, would carry downriver 250,000 to 300,000 sacks of wheat from the fall harvest, at 1,500 sacks per trip. At that time Fred Snipes was the superintendent of the Open River Navigation Company, owners of Relief and another sternwheeler, J.N. Teal.

In November 1907, Relief was tied up at Celilo, unable to navigate because of low water in the upper Columbia river.

=== Overhaul at Celilo ===
On August 23, 1908, the Sunday Oregonian reported that engineers and a deck crew would begin overhauling Relief the next day at Celilo, Oregon, with the objective of starting operations on the upper Columbia river, that is, upstream from Celilo Falls. Short hauls only were to be made, with the steamer operating primarily between Celilo and Columbus, Washington, a former settlement on the Columbia River near Maryhill, in Klickitat County. The Open River Company, owners of Relief, also planned to run the steamer on several trips to Arlington, Oregon and to Alderdale, Washington, to ship wheat, which the Sunday Oregonian reported was coming in rapidly at the time.

=== Connecting service with Portland and upriver points ===
In February 1909, the Open River Navigation company announced a new steamboat service, to run from Portland to Kennewick and Pasco, using Relief and four other steamers operated by the company, J.N. Teal, Sarah Dixon, Inland Empire, and Twin Cities. The new service was announced to begin on March 1, 1909, and would be extended to Lewiston, Idaho, on the Snake River, on March 15. The company promised service to 85 towns or landings in Oregon and Washington, with freight rates reduced below rail shipping charges. The company also stated that it would operate in connection with the Columbia Steamboat company to extend service as far up the Columbia as Priest Rapids.

=== Sinking at dock ===
On October 15, 1909, Relief sank at the Celilo dock with 100 sacks of sugar on board.

=== Transfer to Kennewick-White Bluffs route ===
On July 11, 1912, the Oregon Daily Journal reported that the fruit growers of the White Bluff region of Washington had chartered Relief to replace the recently sunk W.R. Todd. White Bluffs was a settlement 45 miles upriver from Kennewick.

The commercial clubs of the Washington towns of White Bluffs, Hanford, Kennewick, Pasco, and Richland joined to make the arrangements to use Reliefon a tri-weekly schedule. Relief had been lying at Celilo at the time, out of service. Relief ran on the Kennewick - White Bluffs route for a month, but the business was insufficient, and the Open River Transportation company took the steamer off the run. Kennewick was on the Columbia river, three miles upstream from the mouth of the Snake River, at Ainsworth, Washington. Pasco was on the opposite bank of the Columbia from Kennewick.

According to a newspaper report, the shippers gave their business to a rival boat, the Charles Bureau, running under Capt. McMillan. The reasons for this were not clear. Relief lost $30 a day on the route, and according to the terms with local businessmen, they were obligated to pay two months worth of losses to the Open River company. One-third of Relief’s losses were made good by Pasco, one-third by Kennewick, and the rest by the upriver towns.

== Operations on the lower Columbia and Willamette rivers ==
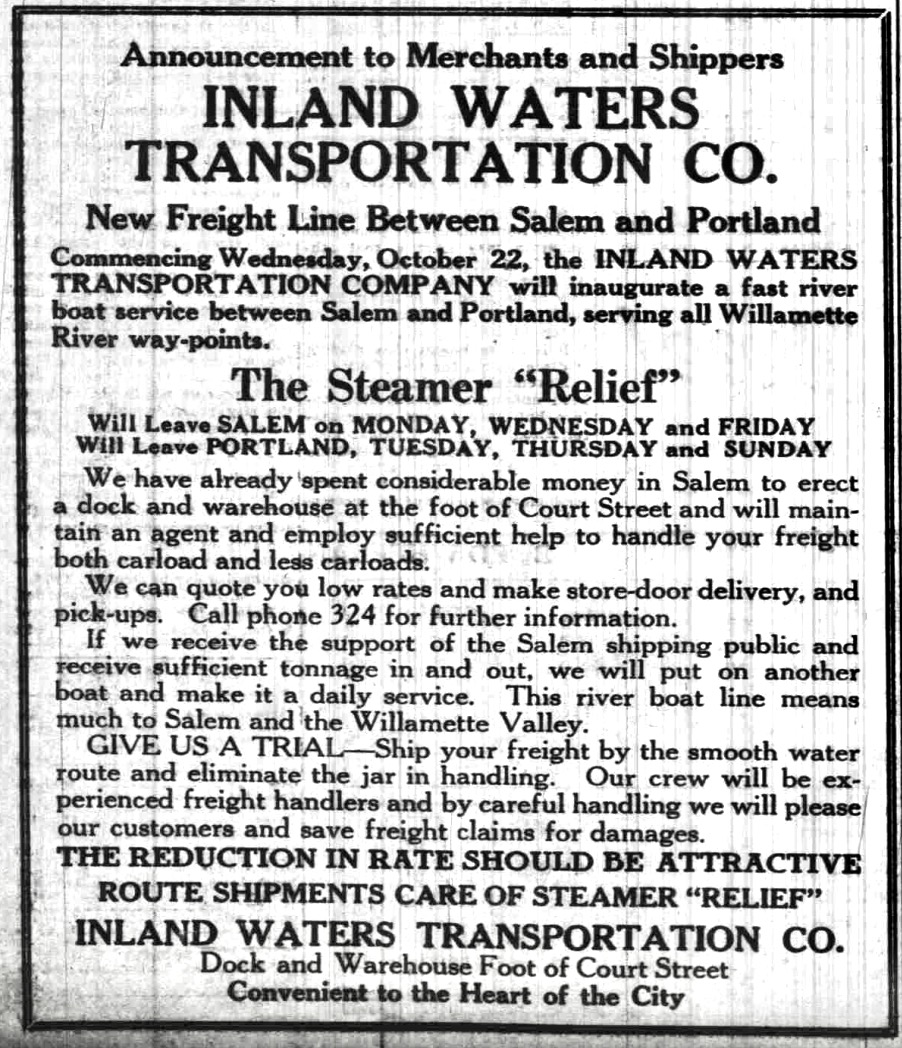
Advertisement for sternwheeler Relief, Oct 29, 1924, in Oregon Statesman.

On January 19, 1915, The Dalles-Columbia line, backed by the Willamette & Columbia River Towing Company, bought four river steamers from the Open River Transportation, including Relief, J.N. Teal, Twin Cities, and Inland Empire. Relief was to run between Pasco and White Bluffs, Washington.

Relief was transferred to the lower Columbia river when the Open River Navigation company gave up its service on the upper river.

In the summer of 1917, Relief, then engaged in trade on the upper Willamette, was acquired by the Yamhill Navigation company, which removed the engines and boilers from another steamer owned by the company, Woodland, to install them in Relief.

On October 14, 1918, Relief, having had its annual inspection by the U.S. steamboat authorities, was being considered by its owners to be placed on the Portland-Lewis River run.

=== Portland-Kelso route ===
In early October 1920, Relief started running on the route along the lower Columbia river from Portland to Kelso, Washington. Relief made three weekly trips to Kelso, and competing on the route with the Greyhound, recently completed at Kelso by the Gore brothers.

On June 3, 1922, Lewis River Transportation company sold its freight franchise between Portland and the Lewis River towns to C.E.O. Brown, who operated a truck line on the Pacific Highway running from Portland to Woodland, Washington. Relief, which reportedly had been making regular runs to Woodland for a long time, was taken off the route upon sale of the franchise.

=== Return to the Willamette ===
On May 5, 1921, the Oregon Daily Journal reported Relief had been chosen to transport Oregon pioneers, and their guests, to a Founders’ Day Celebration the following Saturday, May 7, at Champoeg, Oregon, on the Willamette River. The boat would carry only 150 passengers, and would be commanded on the trip by Captain Lumm.

In June 1921 Relief transported cattle to upriver points on the Willamette.

In late October or early November 1921, Relief ran up on a gravel bar on the Willamette River, near the settlement of Fairfield, in Marion County. Fairfield, now uninhabited, was located on the east bank of the Willamette River, between Salem and Champoeg, about eight miles west of Woodburn, Oregon. The steamer was still there on the bar on November 17, having been stranded by low water conditions in the river.

In early May, 1922, Capt. Willam C. Lumm, master and part owner, brought Relief back into service, after the boat had been laid up for some time. Lumm's objective was to tow the tourist barge Bluebird on sight-seeing trips around the Portland harbor during the summer.

=== Sale to Inland Waters Transportation company ===
On October 19, 1924, the Inland Waters Transportation Company announced that it would inaugurate steamboat service, using Relief, running on the Willamette River from Salem to Portland. Relief was to depart Salem for Portland at 6:00 a.m. every Wednesday, Friday, and Monday, and return to Salem on Tuesdays, Thursdays, and Sundays. Capt. Fritz Kruse was to have command of Relief. Robert Kerns was to be the chief engineer. Freight alone would be carried, and no passengers. To receive freight, the company had built a warehouse in Salem at the intersection of Court and Water streets.

== Sunk at Salem by ice ==
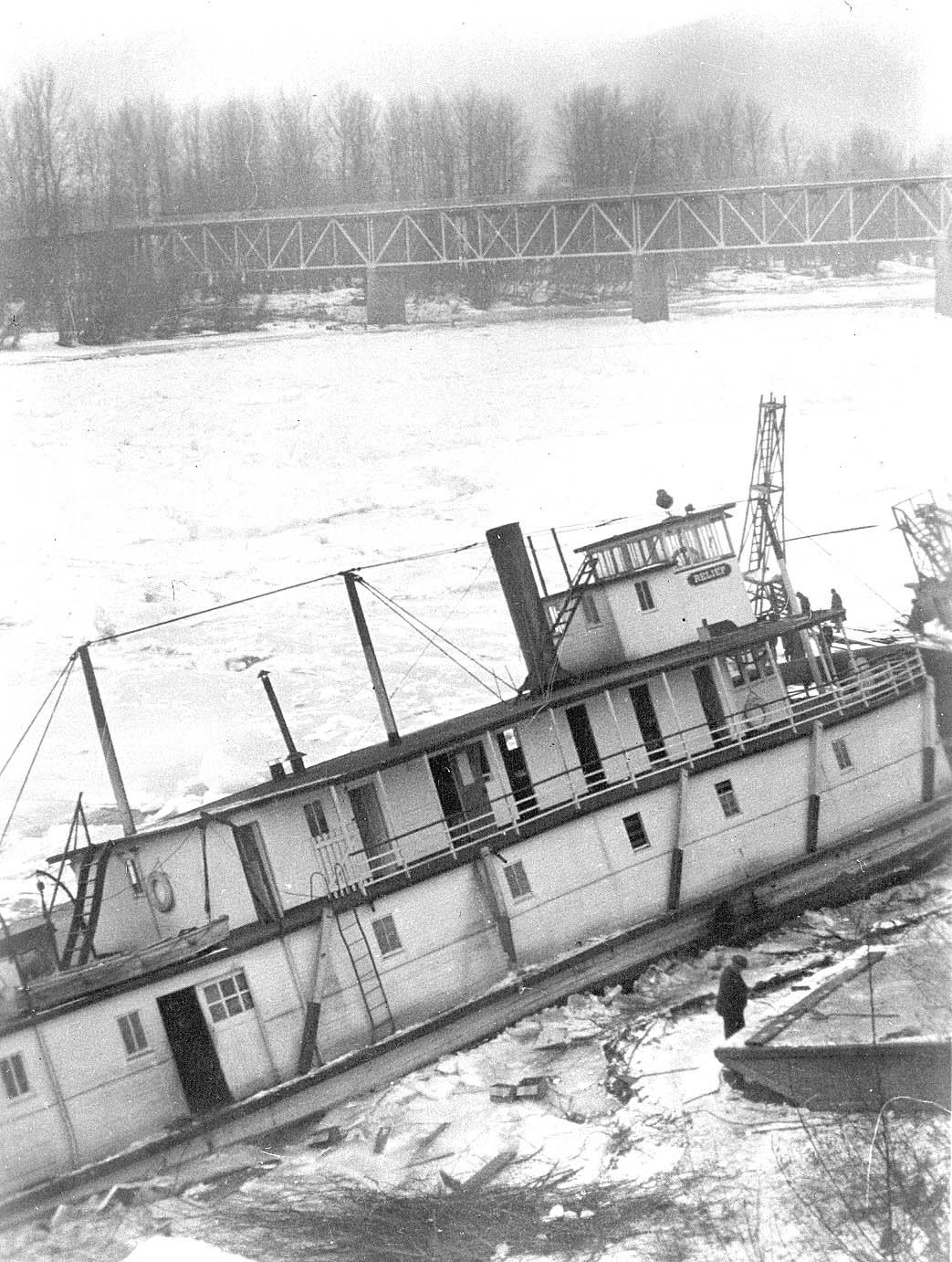
Sternwheeler Relief, crushed in ice at Salem, Oregon.

On December 24, 1924, the Willamette River, for the first time in many years, froze bank to bank at Salem. Relief had loaded nearly 100 tons of cargo, mostly paper, at the Chemeketa street dock at about 10:00 a.m. when a sudden change in current brought ice to the vessel, crossing it against the river bank, listing over badly, and near to capsizing. Efforts to take off the cargo began early in the afternoon, and were successful. Relief was valued at $12,000 and was insured. The boat was being operated at the time by the Inland Waters Transportation company.

On December 29, 1924, the pressure of the ice on the steamer caused the line holding the boat to the riverbank to break, resulting in Relief sinking in about 20 feet of water. About one-half of the vessel was under water.

By January 24, 1925, Relief had been raised. The hole in the hull was about a foot above the water line when the steamer was not loaded, and it had been patched with canvas. Relief was expected to be able to proceed to Portland under its own power for repairs.

By late February 1925, Relief was tied up, out of service, on Willamette Slough, a backwater near Salem. Charles F. Schuab owned Relief when the boat was sunk at Salem. Relief was insured by the Globe & Rutgers Fire Insurance company. Schuab became involved in a dispute with the insurance company, with Schuab insisting that the insurer pay $3,259.26, which it was claimed was the cost of raising the boat. The insurance company claimed that the boat had been allowed to sink.

The insurance company obtained a judgment of $3,500 against Relief, and then purchased the boat for $2,100 at a public auction held to satisfy the judgment. In early July 1925 the insurance company, backed by Lloyd's of London was looking for a buyer for Relief, then still in Salem despite long-standing plans to send it to Portland for repairs.

On August 20, 1926, a newspaper reported Relief had been repaired and placed in service on a regular run between Portland and the Yamhill River.

== Disposition ==
Relief was abandoned in 1931.
