= Surprise (sternwheeler) =

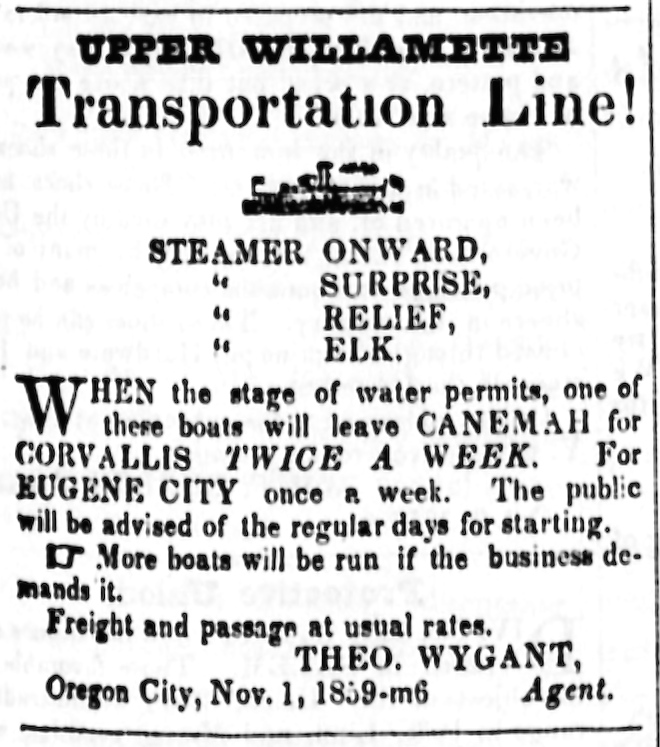
- Advertisement for Surprise and other steamers of the Upper Willamette Transportation Line, published December 3, 1859.

History
- Name: Surprise
- Route: Willamette River
- Builder: Cochrane, Cassidy & Gibson
- In service: 1857
- Fate: Dismantled
- Notes: Engines went to the steamer Senator.

General characteristics
- Type: inland steamship
- Tonnage: 120 gross tons
- Length: 130 ft (40 m), and after reconstruction, 191 ft (58 m)
- Beam: 22 ft (6.7 m)
- Depth: 4.6 ft (1.4 m) depth of hold
- Decks: three (freight, passenger, boat)
- Installed power: twin steam engines, horizontally mounted, each with bore of 14 in (36 cm) and stroke of 60 in (1.5 m).
- Propulsion: stern-wheel

Surprise was a steamboat which operated on the upper Willamette River from 1857 to 1864.

== Construction ==
Surprise was built in 1857 at Canemah, Oregon by Cochrane, Cassidy & Gibson, who had built the James Clinton the year before. Surprise, reportedly a well-built boat, was 130 ft (40 m), feet long, probably exclusive of the extension of the main deck over the stern, called the fantail, on which the stern-wheel was mounted. The beam was 22 ft (6.7 m) feet and the depth of hold was 4.6 ft (1.4 m) feet. The steamer's registered size was 120 tons, a measure of size, not weight.

== Engineering ==
Surprise was a sternwheeler, and the wheel was turned by twin steam engines, horizontally mounted, each with bore of 14 in (36 cm) and stroke of 60 in (1.5 m).

== Operations ==
Surprise was operated on the upper Willamette River by Captain Theodore T. Wygant. Other partners in the boat were Absalom F. Hedges, Oregon City merchant, William. C. Dement & Co., Charles C. Felton, J. Harding, and Robert Patton. In April 1858, Surprise transported the native American leader Tecumtum, also known as Old John, to Fort Vancouver where he was to be held in custody.

As of November 1, 1859, Surprise was running under the control of the Upper Willamette Transportation Line. Other boats controlled by the line were Onward, Elk, and Relief. In December 1859, the line advertised that one of its four boats would leave Canemeh for Corvallis, Oregon twice a week, and for Eugene City once a week, with freight and passage “at the usual rates.” Theodore Wygant (b.1831) was the Oregon City agent for the line.

== Disposition ==
Surprise operated on the upper Willamette until 1864 when it was dismantled and the engines installed in a new steamer, Senator.
