= Moose (sternwheeler) =

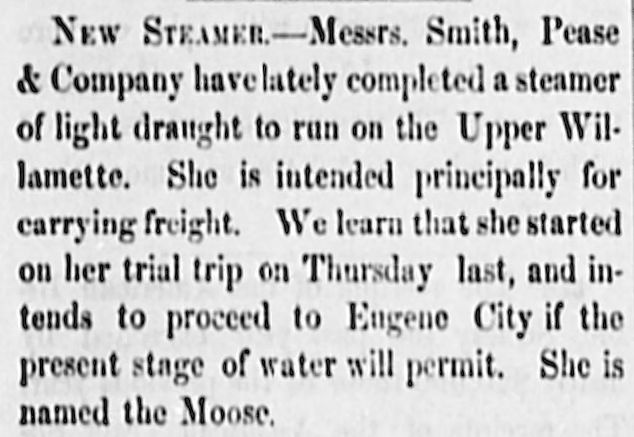
- News item, completion of Moose, Oct. 8, 1859

History
- Name: Moose
- Route: Upper Willamette River
- In service: Oct 4, 1859
- Out of service: 1861
- Fate: Wrecked at Peoria, Oregon

General characteristics
- Type: inland steamship
- Length: 75 ft (22.9 m), exclusive of fantail
- Beam: 16 ft (4.9 m)
- Depth: 4 ft (1 m) depth of hold
- Installed power: twin steam engines, horizontally mounted, each with bore of 12 in (304.8 mm) and stroke of 4 ft (1.22 m)
- Propulsion: stern-wheel

Moose was a steamboat that operated on the Willamette River from late 1859 to 1861.

== Construction ==
Moose was completed by Smith, Pease & Company by October 8, 1859. Another source states that Moose was built at Canemah in 1859 for Smith, Moore, Marshall & Co.

Moose was a light-draft boat built for service on the upper Willamette River. Moose was 75 feet long, probably exclusive of the extension of the main deck over the stern, called the fantail, on which the stern-wheel was mounted. Moose had a beam (width) of 16 feet and a depth of hold of 4 feet.

Moose was driven by twin single-cylinder steam engines each with a cylinder bore of 12 inches and a piston stroke of 48 inches. The engines generated 9.6 nominal horsepower.

== Operations ==
Moose made its trial trip on October 4, 1859. The owners planned to take Moose to Eugene City if the water level permitted.

== Disposition ==
Moose was wrecked in 1861 at Peoria, Oregon.
