= Canemah (sidewheeler) =

American steamboat

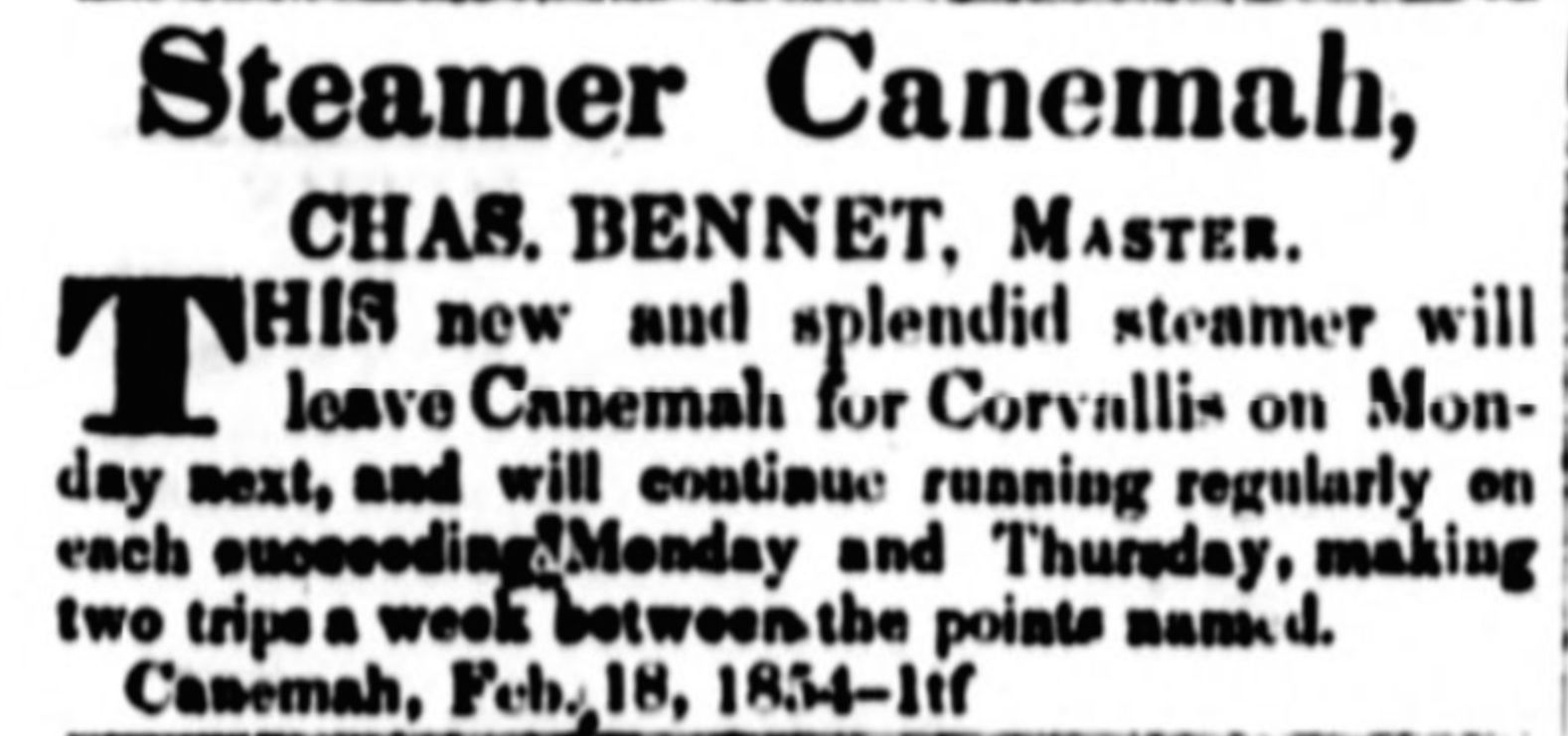
- Advertisement for steamer Canemah, placed May 5, 1854

History
- Name: Canemah
- Owner: Hedges, Bennett, and others
- Route: upper Willamette River
- Builder: Canemah, Oregon Terr.
- In service: 1851
- Out of service: 1857
- Fate: Dismantled 1858, at Canemah or 1857
- Notes: Exploded 1853, one passenger killed, ship repaired

General characteristics
- Type: shallow draft inland passenger/freight, wooden construction
- Tonnage: 88 gross
- Length: 135 ft (41 m)
- Beam: 19 ft (6 m)
- Depth: 4.0 ft (1 m) depth of hold
- Installed power: steam engines, high pressure, horizontally mounted, 10" bore by 48" stroke, 6 horsepower nominal
- Propulsion: sidewheels

Canemah was one of the first steamboats to run on the Willamette River above Willamette Falls. Canemah was the first steamboat to load grain at Corvallis, the first to carry the mail on the Willamette River, and the first steamboat in Oregon to suffer a fatal boiler explosion.

== Design and construction ==
Canemah was designed and built by Absalom F. Hedges (1817–1890), who settled at Canemah, Oregon, in 1844. Hedges saw that the volume of commerce passing down the Willamette was growing too great to be hauled by the canoes and flat boats that were being used in the late 1840s. Hedges and his partners had accumulated several thousand dollars and in late 1849 Hedges went east to arrange for the purchase of machinery for the steamboat he planned to build. In New Orleans Hedges bought two steam engines and arranged to have them shipped to Oregon around Cape Horn.

Hedges returned to Oregon in late 1850, and he and his partners began construction of Canemah. By the end of September 1851, Canemah was launched. The Willamette River had many shallow sections at that time, called "bars". Canemah was designed to pass over all but the shallowest of bars, drawing only 17 inches when fully loaded.

== Operations on the Willamette River ==
The upper Willamette River is much longer than the lower Willamette. The division between the two stretches of the river occurs at Willamette Falls, which was impassable to waterborne traffic. All cargoes bound further south than Oregon City had to be unloaded, portaged around the falls, and loaded again on vessels above the falls. For commercial purposes, the upper Willamette ran from above the falls to the head of navigation, and included important tributary rivers such as the Tualatin and the Yamhill. In the early 1850s the head of navigation was considered to be Corvallis, then known as Marysville.

Until 1851 no steam-powered vessel had ever run on the Upper Willamette. In 1851 several steamers arrived at just about the same time as Canemah. Most of the early vessels were smaller and did not run on regular schedules. Canemah was large for the time, and was the first steamer to enter regularly scheduled service. Canemah's first commanders were captains Bennett and McClosky. Typical freight of freight rates for Canemah was the charge of 20 cents per bushel for wheat shipped to Canemah from the Avery Brothers warehouse at Corvallis, which handled most of the grain then produced in Benton County.

The owners of Canemah were able to obtain the mail contract for the upper river, and the vessel became a floating post office for Nathaniel Coe, who was appointed the postal agent for the Oregon Territory in 1852. He sorted all the letters and packages as the vessel moved along the river, picking up and dropping off the mail at each landing. Canemah made the mail route twice a week between Canemah and Salem. Mail delivery was informal in those days, and it sometimes occurred that residents could wave a letter at a landing to flag the steamer down. Canemah also operated on the Yamhill River up to the town of Lafayette.

Steamers in those days in Oregon were fueled by wood, and they could burn four cords in an hour. What a steamer needed for regular operation were regular wood depots, which were called "wood yards." In the early 1850s woodyards were scarce along the Willamette River, and Canemah was forced to pay farmers five dollars a cord for wood. Few farmers were willing to cut wood and sell, so if Canemah could not embark sufficient fuel at a journey's outset, her trip might be cut short.

In 1851, the Oregon territorial legislature voted to move the capital from Oregon City to Salem. In 1852 Canemah transported all the legislators and all the records of the territorial government upriver to Salem. On other occasions, Canemah carried territorial governor Joseph Lane and other officials. In 1854 the Hedges partners sold Canemah to the Citizens Accommodation Line, a concern organized by Captain George E. Cole and E.M. White. Cole and White also bought the Franklin (ex Shoalwater ex Fenix) and operated both vessels out of Canemah. The company had a carriage which hauled passengers up from Oregon City along the one or two-mile road to Canemah, where twice a week Canemah or Franklin departed for Corvallis.

== Disposition ==
Canemah was dismantled at Canemah in 1858.
