= Lining (steamboat) =

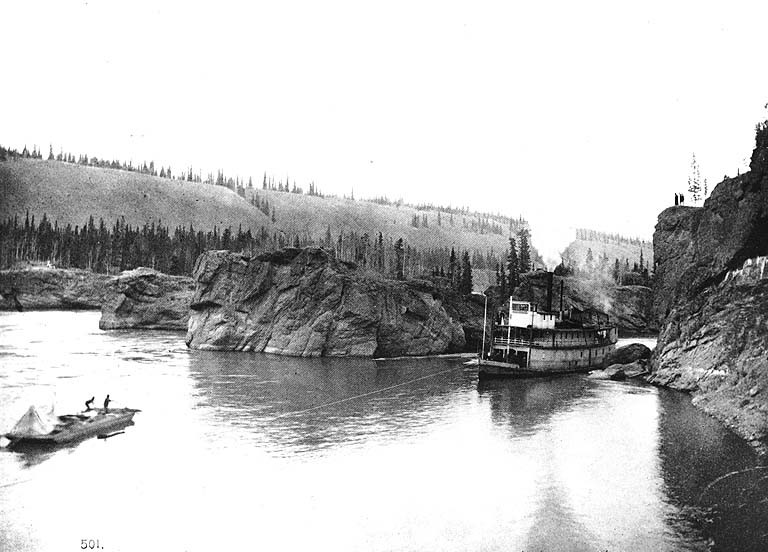
A steamer lining upstream through Five Finger Rapids, on the Yukon River, circa 1899

Lining was a method used by steamboats to move up river through rapids. Lining could also be used to lower steamboats through otherwise impassible falls.

== Technique ==
Lining involved running a rope, called a line or a steel cable to a secure point on shore, typically a large tree or a bolt specially set in a rock, and then wrapping the cable around a steam-powered winch on the boat. The winch would then crank in the cable, if the vessel was going upstream, or gradually let out the cable, if the vessel was headed downstream.

== Use on the Willamette River ==
Along the Willamette River, in the first decades of the 1900s, the most dangerous obstacles to navigation were Willamette Falls and the Clackamas Rapids. Since 1873 locks at Oregon allowed navigation around Willamette Falls, but as late as 1907, lining was still required to pass the Clackamas Rapids, which were located north of Oregon City, near the mouth of the Clackamas River.

== Hazards ==
Lining was dangerous, as it was only the single cable that prevented the vessel from being washed downstream and likely wrecked. Any use of a cable on board a vessel was also hazardous to the crew. On October 15, 1907, at 8:30 am, while Oregona was lining through Clackamas Rapids, the lining cable became tangled in the sternwheel of a nearby steamer, the Ruth. A deckhand on Oregona, Virgil K. Pollard, was caught in a loop of the cable, which tightened around his legs, severing both legs six inches (15 cm) above the ankles. The injured deckhand brought a legal action against the Ruth.

When the case was presented to U.S. District Court Judge Robert S. Bean, he ruled that accident was held to be the fault of the Ruth, for ignoring the warning signals of the Oregona to stand away while the deckhand was engaged in coiling the cable which was still paid out from the Oregona following an unsuccessful lining attempt. Judge Bean awarded the deckhand, who was 19 years of age at the time of the accident, $12,000 in damages.
