= Onward (1858 sternwheeler) =

Steamboat

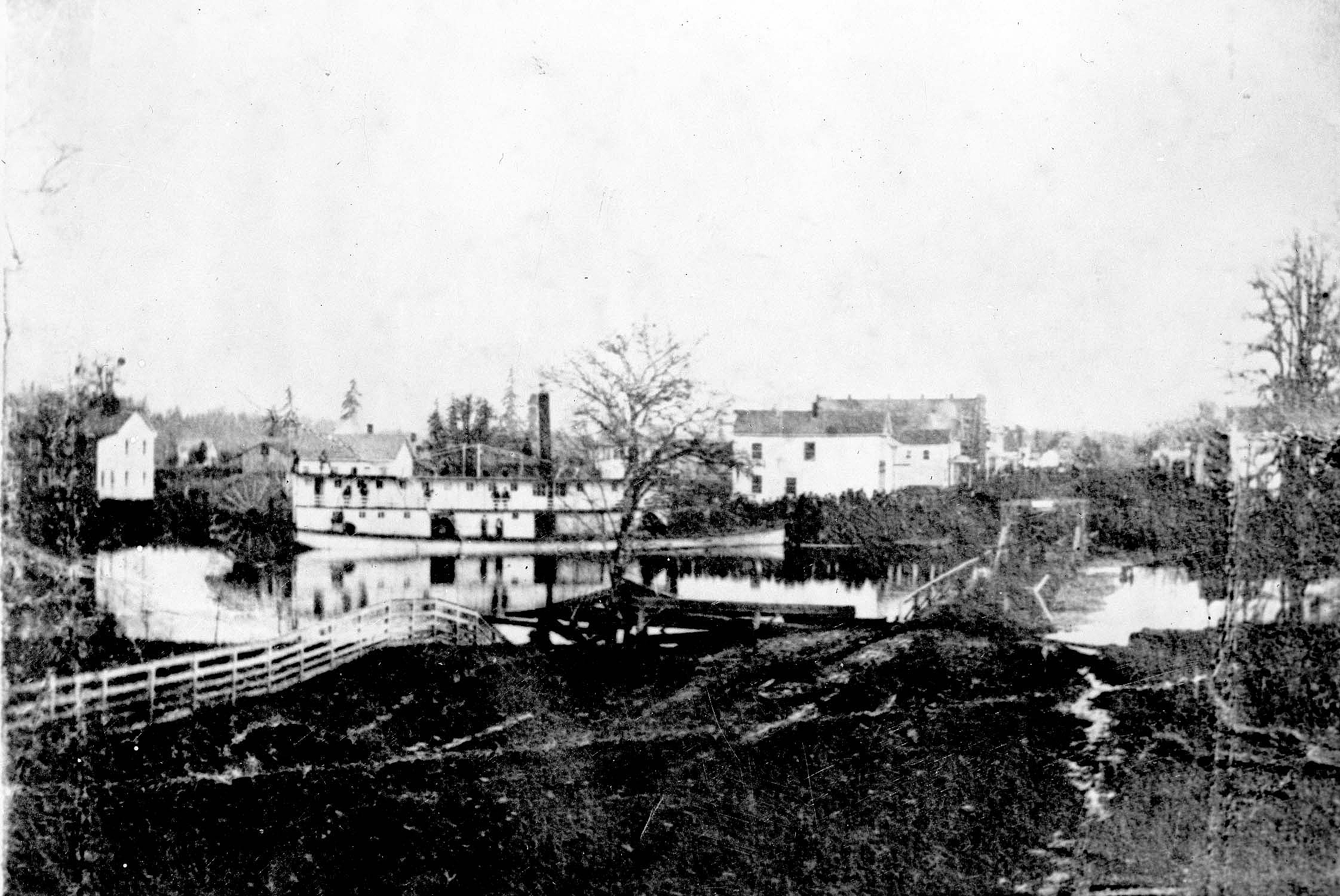
- Onward assisting at Salem, Oregon during Willamette River floods of late 1861

History
- Name: Onward
- Owner: Oregon Steam Navigation Company
- Route: upper Willamette River
- In service: 1858
- Out of service: 1865 or 1880
- Identification: US 19154
- Fate: Dismantled at Canemah

General characteristics
- Type: shallow draft inland passenger-freighter
- Tonnage: 120 gross
- Length: 120 ft (37 m)
- Beam: 26 ft (8 m)
- Depth: 4.0 ft (1 m) depth of hold
- Installed power: steam, twin high pressure horizontally mounted, single-cylinder engines, 16" bore by 60" stroke, 17 horsepower nominal
- Propulsion: sternwheel

Onward was an early steamboat on the Willamette River built at Canemah, Oregon in 1858. This vessel should not be confused other steamboats named Onward, including in particular the Onward of 1867, a similar but somewhat smaller vessel built at Tualatin Landing, which operated on the Tualatin River under Capt. Joseph Kellogg.

== Design, construction and ownership ==
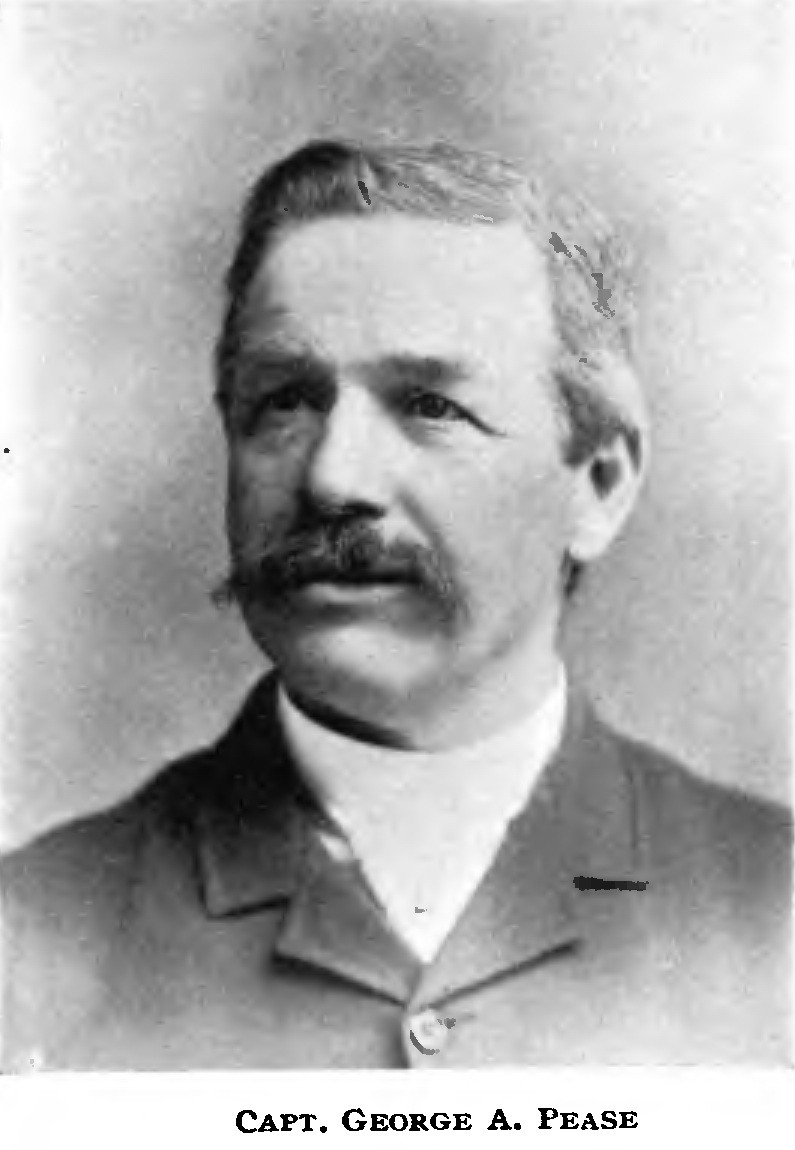
George A. Pease, an early captain of Onward

Onward was the successor of the Enterprise in Capt. Archibald Jamieson's line of steamers. She was built at Canemah with the proceeds from the sale of the Enterprise to Capt. Tom Wright, and was intended to compete with the Surprise, which had preceded her a few months. Jamieson ran her until 1860, when he sold her to Jacob Kamm, Josiah Myrick, James Strang, and George A. Pease. With Pease in command, Onward proved a money-maker from the start, paying $14,000 in dividends the first year. Kamm and Myrick were both shareholders in the Oregon Steam Navigation Company and it was at this time that the steamer came under the control of that powerful combination. Pease ran her until about 1863, when the boat was transferred to the People's Transportation Company and Capt. George Jerome took command. She was a serviceable boat and was considered to be very well powered, with large engines and a new style locomotive boiler.

== Rescue mission during 1861 floods ==
During the great flood of the Willamette River in November and December 1861, which among other things destroyed Champoeg and Linn City, the steamer was able to run through the streets of Salem to rescue people. For Onward this started out as a routine upriver journey from Canemah. The river was cluttered with debris from riverside houses and landings that had been washed downstream by the flood. By the time Onward reached Salem, her ordinary commercial operation turned into one of rescuing people from the flooded city.

== Transfer to People's Transportation Company ==
Onward was operated by the Oregon Steam Navigation Company, or "O.S.N.", which was on its way to achieving a monopoly on river transport on both the Columbia and Willamette rivers. In the 1860s there were in Oregon no railroads of any length and roads of any kind were crude and difficult. All modern transport proceeded on the rivers, and control over the rivers would have given O.S.N. effective commercial dominion over the entire Pacific Northwest region of the United States.

O.S.N beat back or bought out all challengers until the People's Transportation Company was organized and put up such hot competition for O.S.N. that a deal was reached whereby People's would stay off the Columbia river, O.S.N. would stay off the Willamette, People's would get a cash subsidy from O.S.N., and the two companies would swap boats, O.S.N. to receive People's boats on the Columbia, and People's to gain O.S.N.'s boats on the Willamette, which included Onward.
