= Canemah, Oregon =

- Canemah Historic District
- U.S. National Register of Historic Places
- U.S. Historic district
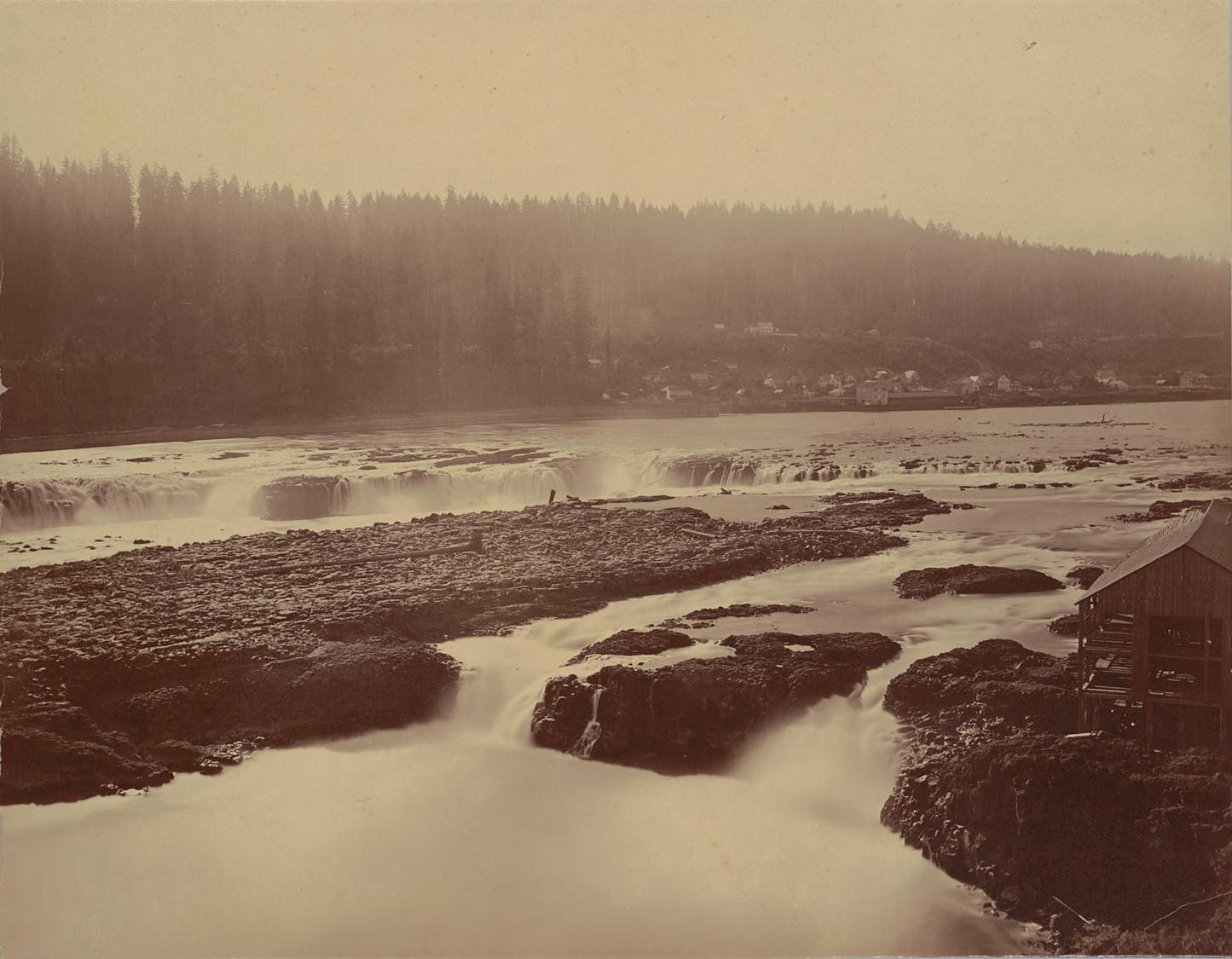
- Willamette Falls looking south, with Canemah, Oregon, in background on left, 1867

- Location within Oregon Location within the United States
- Location: Roughly bounded by Willamette River, 5th Ave., Marshall and Paquet Sts., Oregon City, Oregon
- Area: 63.7 acres (25.8 ha)
- Built: 1928
- Architectural style: Classical Revival, Bungalow/craftsman, Gothic Revival
- NRHP reference No.: 78002279
- Added to NRHP: October 11, 1978

Canemah was an early settlement in the U.S. state of Oregon located near the Willamette River. Canemah was annexed to Oregon City in 1928.

== Location ==
The district of Canemah is located on the east side of the Willamette River. At that time, Oregon City was a separate settlement, and was located below the Willamette Falls above which Canemah sits. The two towns were connected by a path, later upgraded to an ox track.

== Early history ==
Oregon was first inhabited by Native Americans, and was considered by the Calapooya tribe to be part of their territory. Native Americans traveled up and down the waterfall by canoes. Canemah is significant to this because it was the southern point of where Native Americans needed to go through to cross the waterfall. The name "Canemah" itself means "the canoe place". There was said to have been a dispute among the Native Americans as to which of their nations would control this area. The reason is that whoever controlled Canemah and its northern areas could toll anyone who crossed that area to cross the waterfall in their canoe. Many people were killed, apparently also called "Canemahs" who had occupied Canemah and claimed the right to charge tolls for use of the area.

== Pioneer settlement ==
The first white settler at Canemah was Absalom F. Hedges (1817–1890). He arrived in Oregon City in 1844, and found all the good lots already taken. He then went south to Canemah, and staked out a Donation Land Claim close to the canoe landing place. Water travel above the falls was still mainly conducted by the Native Americans using canoes at this point, although they also paddled the flat boats, sometimes known as bateaux, that were starting to appear on the river. A few settlers had already established themselves in the Willamette Valley, and the boats and canoes brought their farm products to Canemah. At Canemah, they were loaded on ox-carts and carried around the falls to Oregon City. New emigrants to the Willamette Valley, and all of their goods, were then hauled back to Canemah up the track from Oregon City by the same ox-carts.

== Beginning of steamboat business ==
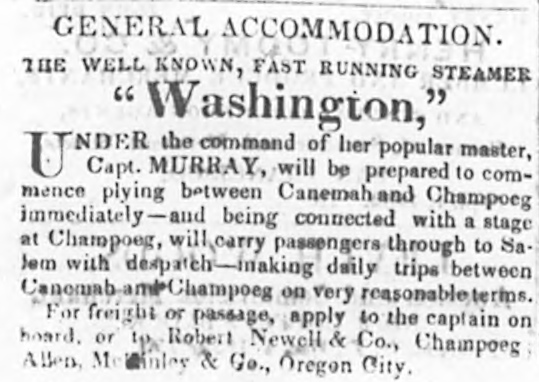
1852 advertisement for the "splendid steamer Washington" running between Canemah and Champoeg Oregon Territory

By 1849, Hedges had opened up a tannery and laid out a townsite at Canemah, which he called "Falls City." With his brother-in-law William Barrow, Hedges set up a sawmill and opened a store. The name "Falls City" never caught on and the place continued to be called "Canemah." As river traffic increased, Hedges and some partners decided to put a steamboat on the Willamette above the falls. Hedges gathered up several thousand dollars in gold, and made a trip back east to buy the machinery for the vessel. He bought two engines which were shipped around Cape Horn to Oregon. Hedges and his partners returned overland.

== Steamboats in the Willamette ==
By the time Hedges and his party returned to Oregon, there were already three steamboats operating on the upper Willamette, Hoosier, Washington, and Multnomah. In June 1851, the small Hoosier was making three trips a week from Canemah up the Yamhill River, a tributary of the Willamette, to Dayton. The much larger Multnomah was assembled at Canemah in the spring of 1851 from parts premanufactured in the east, and made her first trial run in August 1851.

Facing this competition, Hedges and company began construction on the new steamboat, named Canemah, which was launched near the end of September 1851 and entered service in late 1851. About this time, a new ox road was blasted along the river in the basalt cliffs that separated Canemah from Oregon City. Wagon traffic ran all day and night; night traffic was lit by torches burning along the road.

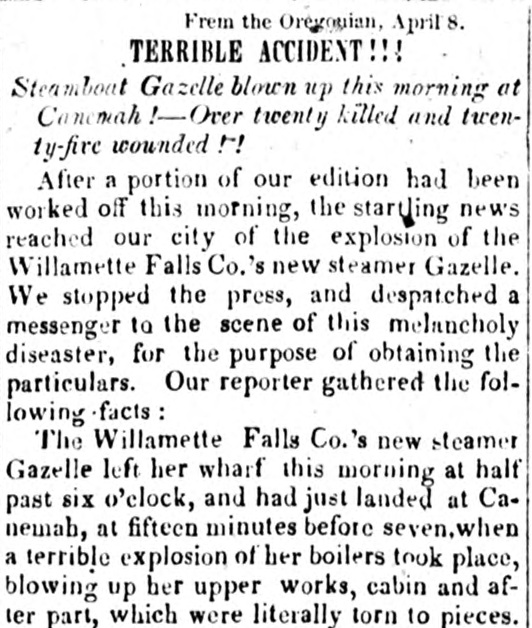
Newspaper story on explosion of Gazelle

Canemah was an important place in the 1850s, and many more stores and residences were built, as well as nine or ten steamboats in addition to Multnomah and Canemah. During this period, on April 8, 1854, the spectacular and tragic explosion of the new steamboat Gazelle occurred. Other steamboats built at Canemah in the 1850s included Yamhill (1851), Shoalwater (1852) (later known by other names), Wallamet (1853), Enterprise (1855), James Clinton (1856), Elk, Surprise (1857), Onward and Moose.

== Reconstruction after flood of 1861 ==
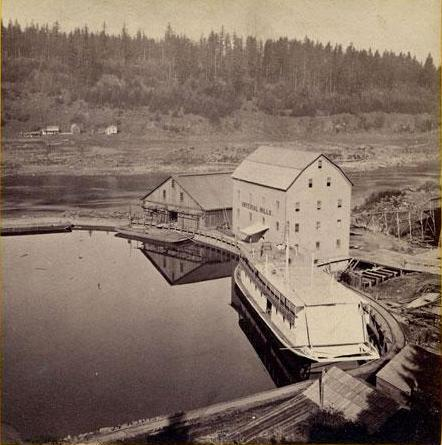
Boat basin above Willamette Falls, 1867, with sternwheeler under construction

Canemah, built almost at the river's level, was wiped out by the flood of December 1861. Afterwards, the wharves and some buildings were reconstructed, and prosperity seemed certain. More steamboats were built and a portage railway was built along the east back to replace the lumbering ox carts. The People's Transportation Company was organized, and the company built an improved boat basin above the falls. A canal was cleared below the falls which lessened the portage distance. New steamboats were built above the falls to serve customers upriver. These included a second Yamhill (1860), Unio/Union (1861), a second Enterprise (1863), Reliance (1865), Active (1865), Fannie Patton (1865), Echo (1865), Albany (1868), Success, and Dayton (1868).

== Decline of importance ==
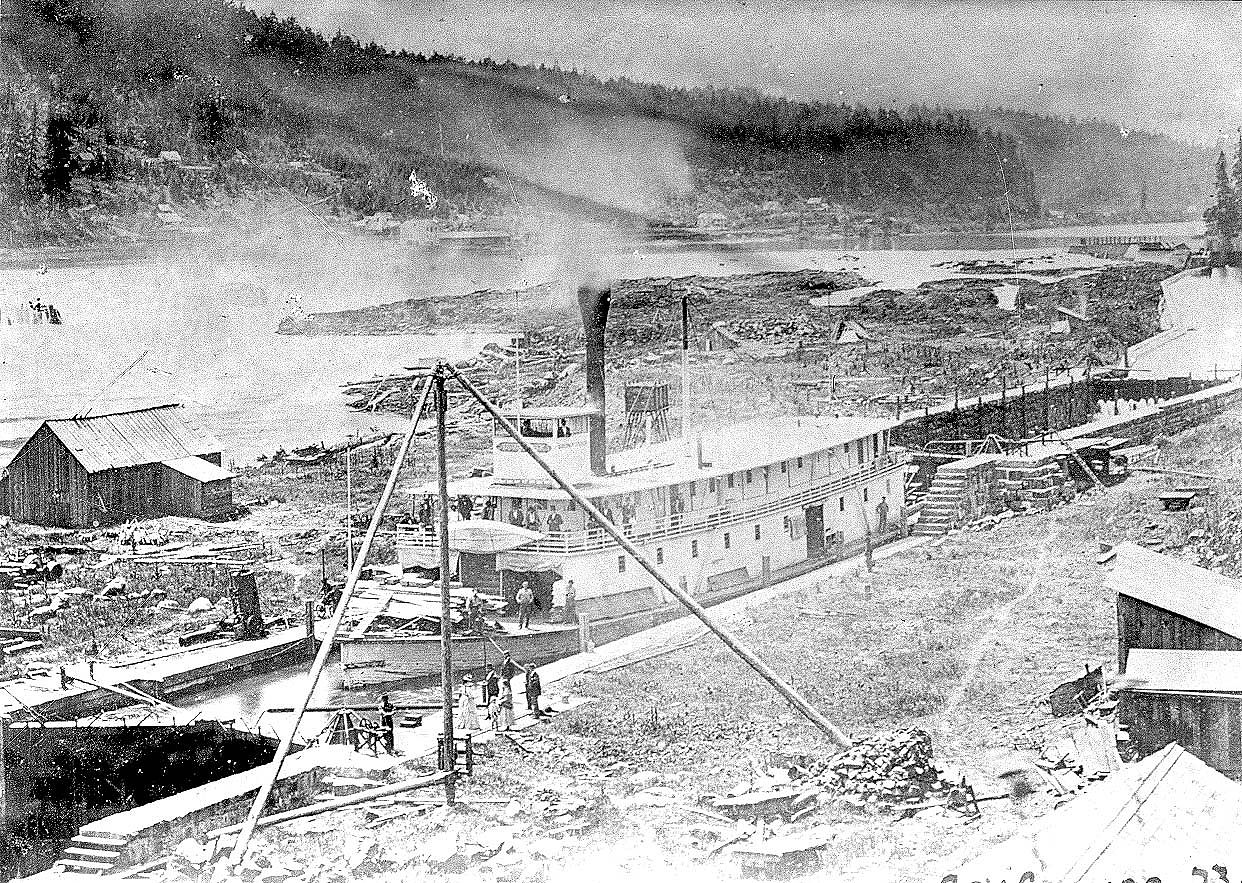
The opening of the Willamette Locks in 1873 marked the beginning of the decline of Canemah's importance as a separate city. This is the Governor Grover, the first steamboat to pass through the locks on March 21, 1873.

In 1870, the Oregon State Legislature allocated funds for the construction of locks on the west side of the falls. By 1873 the locks were complete. Steamers could now move directly from Portland all the way to the Corvallis, with no portage. Towns based on the portage, like Canemah, started to fade in importance. During the 1870s, three or four more steamboats were built at Canemah, and these were the last to be built above the falls: the Shoo-Fly (Another steamboat on the Columbia River built three years later was named Don't Bother Me), Alice, and McMinnville (1877), and the smaller Carrie Norton (1878). By 1892, the name Canemah had been almost forgotten and the area came to be known as simply another part of Oregon City. Canemah is now listed on the National Register of Historic Places as a historic district.
