= Albany (1868 sternwheeler) =

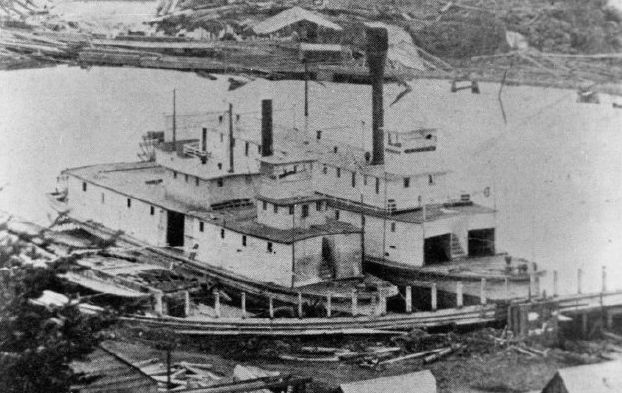
- Steamers Shoo Fly (left) and Albany (right) at boat basin in Oregon City, circa 1873.

History
- Name: Albany
- Owner: People's Transportation Company; Ben Holladay
- Route: Willamette River
- In service: 1868
- Out of service: 1875
- Identification: U.S. # 1738
- Fate: Wrecked near mouth of Long Tom River, Jan. 6, 1875

General characteristics
- Class & type: riverine all-purpose
- Tonnage: 328 gross tons
- Length: 127 ft (38.7 m) over hull (exclusive of fantail)
- Beam: 27 ft (8.2 m) over hull (exclusive of guards)
- Depth: 3 ft 6 in (1.07 m)
- Installed power: twin steam engines, horizontally mounted, each with bore of 16.5 in (42 cm) and stroke of 50 in (130 cm).
- Propulsion: stern-wheel

Albany was a stern-wheel driven steamboat that operated on the Willamette River from 1868 to 1875. This vessel should not be confused with the later sternwheeler Albany (ex N.S. Bentley), which ran, also on the Willamette River, from 1896 to 1906, when it was rebuilt and renamed Georgie Burton.

== Construction ==
Albany was built in 1868 at Canemah, Oregon for the People's Transportation Company. Shipbuilder G.M. Stickler (b.1836) assisted in the construction of the Albany, as he had with other steamers, Dayton, Success, McMinnville, and Senator. Albany was built at the same time as the Success. Albany was reported to be a "very light draft steamer."

== Design ==
Albany was 127 ft (38.7 m) long exclusive of the extension over the main deck, called the "fantail", on which the stern-wheel was mounted. The steamer had a beam (width) of 27 ft (8.2 m), exclusive of the long protective timbers installed on the sides of the boat at the top of the hull, called the guards. The depth of hold was 3 ft 6 in (1.07 m). The official merchant vessel registry number was 1738.

== Engineering ==
Albany was driven by a stern-wheel, turned by twin steam engines, horizontally mounted, each with bore of 16.5 in (42 cm) and stroke of 50 in (130 cm). The overall size of the vessel was 328 gross tons, which was a measure of volume, and not weight.

== Operations ==
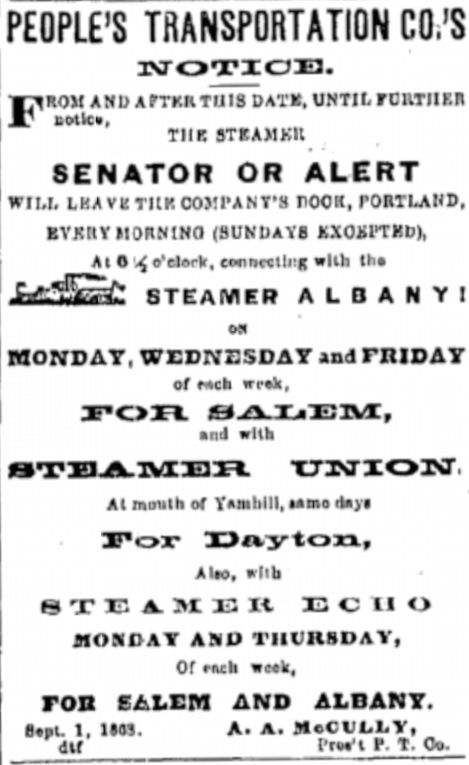
Advertisement dated Sept. 1, 1868, for steamers of the People's Transportation Company, including the then new Albany.

=== Officers ===
After completion, Albany was piloted by Capt. Aaron Vickers (d.1875) and, for a short time, by Capt. James D. Miller. George A. Pease is also reported to have been one of the steamer's first captains. Most of the time Albany was operated by captains Aaron Vickers and George Jerome.

=== Initial routes ===
Albany was in operation by August 1868, running from Oregon City to Salem, Oregon. During one trip in August, the low water period on the Willamette, a reporter on board wrote later that the steamer "actually navigated some parts like wet gravel. We have specimen stones thrown out of the bed of the river by her wheel, in our office."

On September 1, 1868, the People's Transportation Company placed Albany on a schedule of running from Oregon City to Salem Oregon three times a week on Mondays, Wednesdays, and Fridays. A connection was made at Oregon City with either of the sternwheelers Senator or Alert running daily (Sunday excepted) from Portland.

=== Low water impedes navigation ===
Just after Albany was placed in service, in early September 1868, very low water in the Willamette River made it difficult for it and two other two boats then operating on the upper river, Success and Echo to make a connection between Canemah and Salem, Oregon.

The Morning Oregonian said at the time: "The boats are all that could be desired, and the boatmen skillful and very energetic, but they can't run on dry land."

On Monday, June 27, 1870, Albany called at Eugene, Oregon with a load of freight. This was considered very late in the season for a steamer to reach Eugene.

=== Heavy load of wool ===
On the Monday before June 23, 1871, Albany came downriver to the city of Albany, Oregon "loaded to the guards with wool." According to the Eugene Guard, on Albany's last call at Eugene prior to June 30, 1871, the steamer loaded 361 bales of wool, weighing a total of 59,311 pounds, or approximately 30 tons.

=== Sale to Ben Holladay ===
On September 6, 1871, by vote of its shareholders, the People's Transportation Company was dissolved and all of its assets, including the steamer Albany, were sold to a company organized by the prominent businessman Ben Holladay.

=== Later operations ===
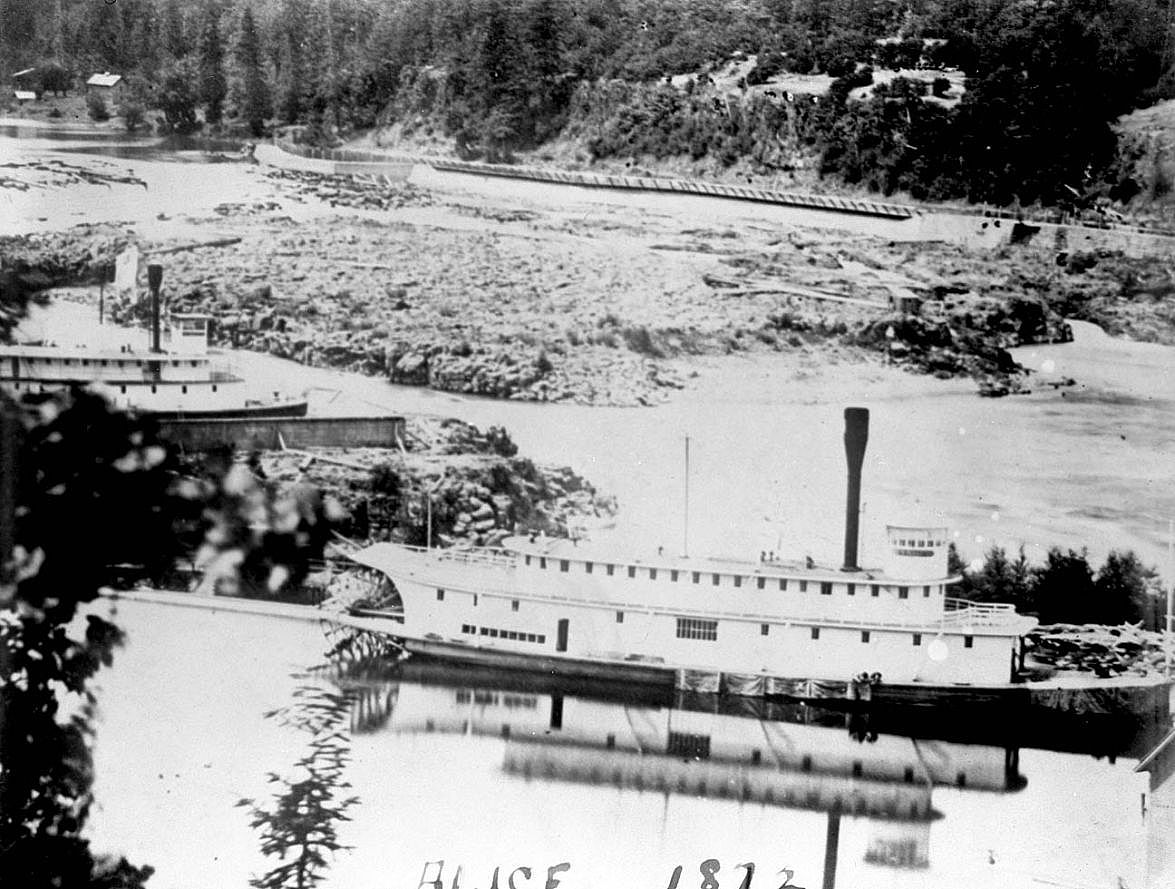
Steamers Albany (left) and Alice (right), at boat basin in Oregon City, Oregon, circa 1874.

At the end of July 1871, steamboat business had fallen off. The sternwheeler Fannie Patton, which had been running from Oregon City to Salem, was taken out of service, with the Albany taking its place. Shoo Fly would take Albany's place on the run from Salem to Corvallis, Oregon.

The small amount of downriver freight was said to have been caused by the high prices for wheat and wool in the spring of the year, which brought those commodities into the market, leaving not much left in the countryside to ship. Upriver freight however was reported to have been good for season.

In mid-February 1874, Albany hit a snag near Harrisburg, Oregon, and sustained three small holes in the hull. Most of the cargo was taken off by Success, and Albany proceeded downriver. The damage was thought to have been light.

In March 1874, Albany departed once a week from Oregon City for Harrisburg, Eugene, and all intermediate points. Albany was then owned by the Oregon Steamship Company, which also ran other steamers on the upper Willamette from Oregon City: Alice to Corvallis twice a week, Dayton, to the cities of Dayton, Lafayette, and McMinnville, all on the Yamhill River, and Fannie Patton, to Albany, twice a week.

All these steamers made a connection at the boat basin in Oregon City with the steamer E.N. Cooke, which made daily runs on the upper Willamette, below Willamette Falls, departing Oregon City for Portland daily (except Sundays) at 7:30 a.m., and leaving Portland at 2:00 p.m. on the return trip to Oregon City. John D. Biles was the agent for all of them.

== Sunk near Long Tom River ==
Albany was wrecked on January 6, 1875, at the mouth of the Long Tom River, and abandoned as a total loss. The steamer had been proceeding up the Willamette River, with no cargo on board, and had just passed the confluence of the Long Tom, when it hit a snag.

The initial report was that the captain managed to beach the steamer before it filled with water, the damage was small, and readily reparable. When news of the incident reached, Oregon City, the sternwheeler Success was dispatched to go to the assistance of the Albany. However the initial reports were incorrect, and it was not feasible to repair Albany.

In mid-January 1875, the boilers and machinery of Albany were salvaged and brought downriver to Portland by Success. The Oregon Steamship Company intended to install the machinery into one of two new shallow-draft freight steamers it was planning on building, in the middle of March, 1875, for the upper Willamette trade. The machinery from Alert would go into the other planned new sternwheeler.

Captain Aaron Vickers, who was in charge of Albany at the time of the wreck, died at Oregon City on February 13, 1875, reportedly from the effects of exposure at the time of the sinking.
