= Dayton (sternwheeler) =

1868 steamboat

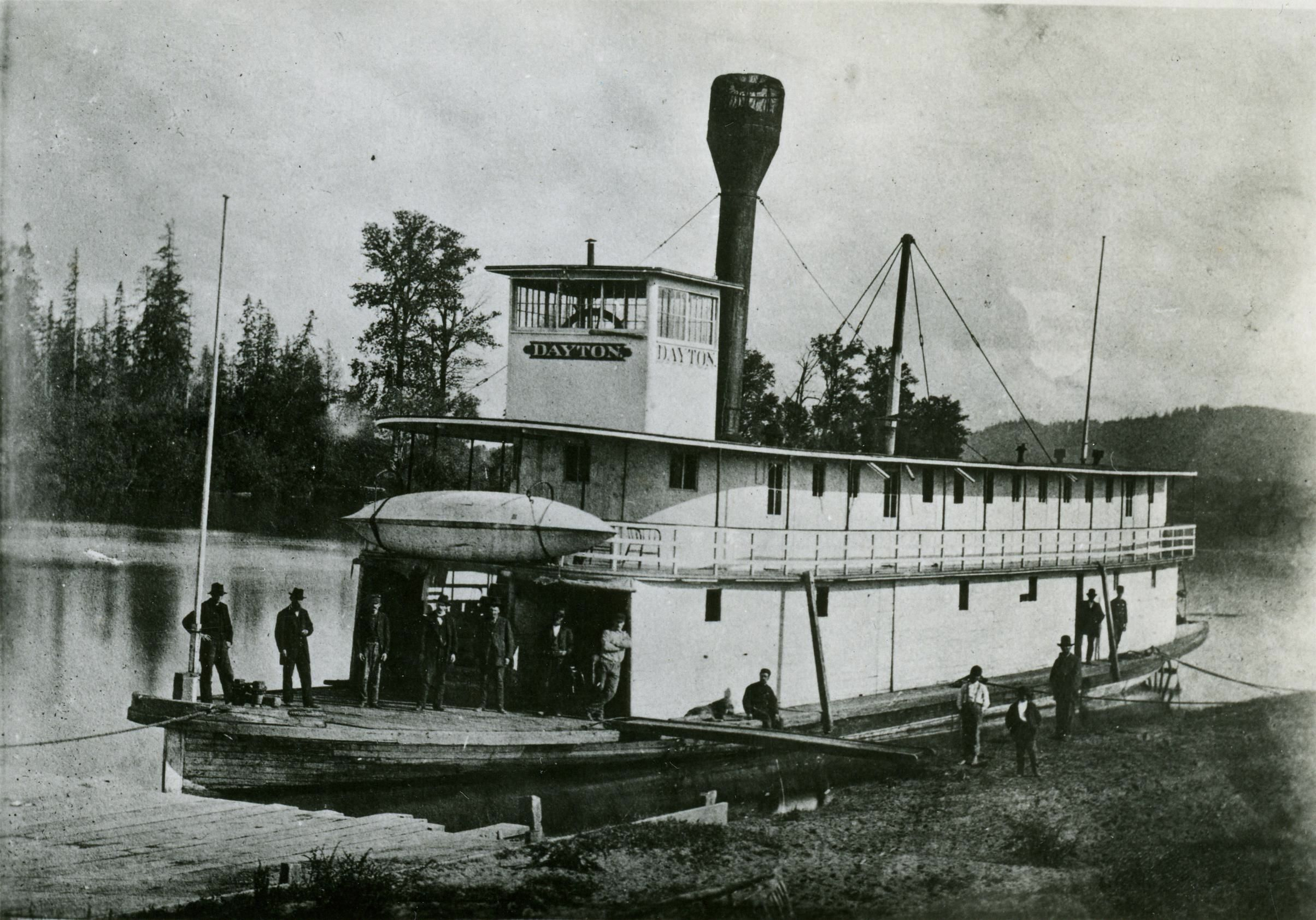
- Steamer Dayton 1881 or before.

History
- Name: Dayton
- Owner: People's Transportation Co.; Ben Holladay; Joseph Kellogg
- Route: Willamette. Yamhill River, Columbia, and Cowlitz rivers
- Completed: 1868
- Identification: U.S. # 6618
- Fate: Dismantled 1881

General characteristics
- Class & type: riverine all-purpose
- Tonnage: 202.04 gross tons (1879).
- Length: 117 ft (35.7 m) over hull (exclusive of fantail)
- Beam: 20 ft (6.1 m) over hull (exclusive of guards
- Depth: 4 ft 6 in (1.37 m)
- Decks: two (main and passenger)
- Installed power: twin steam engines, horizontally mounted, each with bore of 12 in (300 mm) and stroke of 4 ft (1.2 m), 9.6 nominal horsepower
- Propulsion: stern-wheel

Dayton was a steamboat which operated on the Willamette and Columbia rivers from 1868 to 1881. Dayton operated on the Willamette from 1868 to 1876, mostly upriver from Willamette Falls, including a route on the Yamhill River to Dayton, Oregon, after which the steamer was named. From 1876 to 1881, Dayton was employed on a run from Portland to Monticello, W.T., which was located on the site of what is now Longview, Washington.

== Construction ==
Dayton was built for the People's Transportation Company. Dayton was constructed along the Willamette River at Canemah, Oregon, above Willamette Falls, in 1868, by the Paquet brothers.

Dayton was launched on Saturday, August 8, 1868. Machinery still had to be installed into the vessel, and it was hoped to have it ready for the fall shipping season.

== Engineering ==
Dayton was driven by a stern-wheel, turned by twin steam engines, horizontally mounted, single cylinder, bore 12 in (300 mm), stroke 4 ft (1.2 m) generating 9.6 nominal horsepower.

== Dimensions ==
Dayton was 117 ft (35.7 m) long, exclusive of the extension of the main detail over the stern, called the "fantail" on which the stern-wheel was mounted.

The beam (width) of the vessel was 20 ft (6.1 m) exclusive of the protective wooden timbers running along the top of the hull called the guards. The depth of hold was 4 ft 6 in (1.37 m).

In 1879, Dayton was 202.04 gross tons, which was a measure of size, not weight. The official merchant vessel registry number was 6618.

== Service on the upper Willamette River ==
Dayton was operated on the upper Willamette River (from Willamette Falls upstream to the head of navigation at Eugene City), and the Yamhill River until 1875. After that the steamer was transferred to the lower Willamette and Columbia rivers, where it served until about 1881.

The first commander of Dayton was John T. Apperson, who was followed by George Jerome, L.E. Pratt, and Joseph Kellogg. In July 1869, Edward Fellows, of Canemah, was the engineer of the Dayton.

In November 1870, Dayton was reported to have spent a long time running solely on the Yamhill River, making connections at the mouth of the Yamhill with boats on the Willamette River.

On April 26, 1871, Dayton carried about 150 persons on an excursion from Oregon City to Dayton, Oregon.

In early September 1871, Yamhill County, Oregon was producing large amounts of wheat. Dayton picked up wheat cargoes three times a week, but could not keep the warehouse clear.

=== Sale to Ben Holladay ===
On September 6, 1871, by vote of its shareholders, the People's Transportation Company was dissolved and all of its assets, including the steamer Dayton, were sold to a company organized by the prominent businessman Ben Holladay.

=== Schedule change ===
In May 1873, there was a schedule change for Dayton. Dayton would now make only two trips a week from Canemah to the Yamhill River, leaving on Tuesdays and Thursdays. Dayton made connections at Oregon City with the steamer E.N. Cooke, which operated on the lower Willamette River. Cooke departed Oregon City for Portland daily (except Sunday) at 8:30 a.m., except for Wednesdays and Fridays, when it left at 10:30 a.m.

By September 1873, the Oregon and California Railroad had completed a rail line from Portland to Oregon City. Travellers from Portland bound for Lafayette, Oregon and other points on the Yamhill River would take the railway south to Canemah, and board Dayton, which now departed Canemeh twice a week, on Tuesdays and Fridays, for the Yamhill.

Dayton and the connecting boat, E.N. Cooke, where then under the ownership of the Oregon Steamship Company, agent J.B. Biles. Oregon Steamship Co. was associated with the Oregon and California Railroad,

These arrangements continued with occasional variations until July 1876.

=== Race with City of Salem ===
In the second half of January 1876, Dayton raced the sternwheeler City of Salem from Rock Island to the mouth of the Yamhill River, with Dayton besting Salem.

=== Idled for lack of business ===
On March 31, 1876, the steamers Dayton, Bonanza, and Success were out of service and tied up in the boat basin in Oregon City. This was because there was insufficient shipping business to justify operating the vessels. Nearly all of the stored wheat at the various landings had been brought downriver, and there appeared to be little prospect of sufficient cargo that season to justify putting the steamers into operation. A newspaper report stated that Dayton and Success would "probably not be in use again, as they are getting old and are of such small capacity as not to be worth repairing."

=== Sunk by Occident ===
On Saturday, May 13, 1876, Dayton was moored at Oregon City, when another sternwheeler, the Occident, owned by the Willamette River Transportation and Locks Company came into the boat basin at full steam to unload a cargo of wheat for the Oregon City Mills.

While passing the boat yard, where Dayton was moored, Occident threw up a wake which pushed the Dayton over on to a snag, knocking a hole in the hull, and sinking Dayton almost immediately. The following Monday, May 15, three pumps were placed into Dayton and worked from the sternwheeler Bonanza. After a full day of pumping, they were able to raise the Dayton.

== Transfer to the Monticello run ==
On August 31, 1876 Dayton was placed on the route from Portland, to Monticello, W.T., in place of the sternwheeler Onward which was being withdrawn from service at the time.

=== Run to St. Helens in icy conditions ===
In January 1879, parts of the Columbia River became choked with ice, reported to be piled 12 feet high in some places east of Swan Island. The ice was not uniform however. On January 10, 1879, using Willamette Slough Dayton, under Captain Kellogg, ran from Portland to St. Helens, Oregon and returned, carrying the mail. Kellogg encountered no ice in Willamette Slough, as far as Kellogg could observe, there was no ice in the Columbia.

=== Strange entertainment on the Fourth of July ===
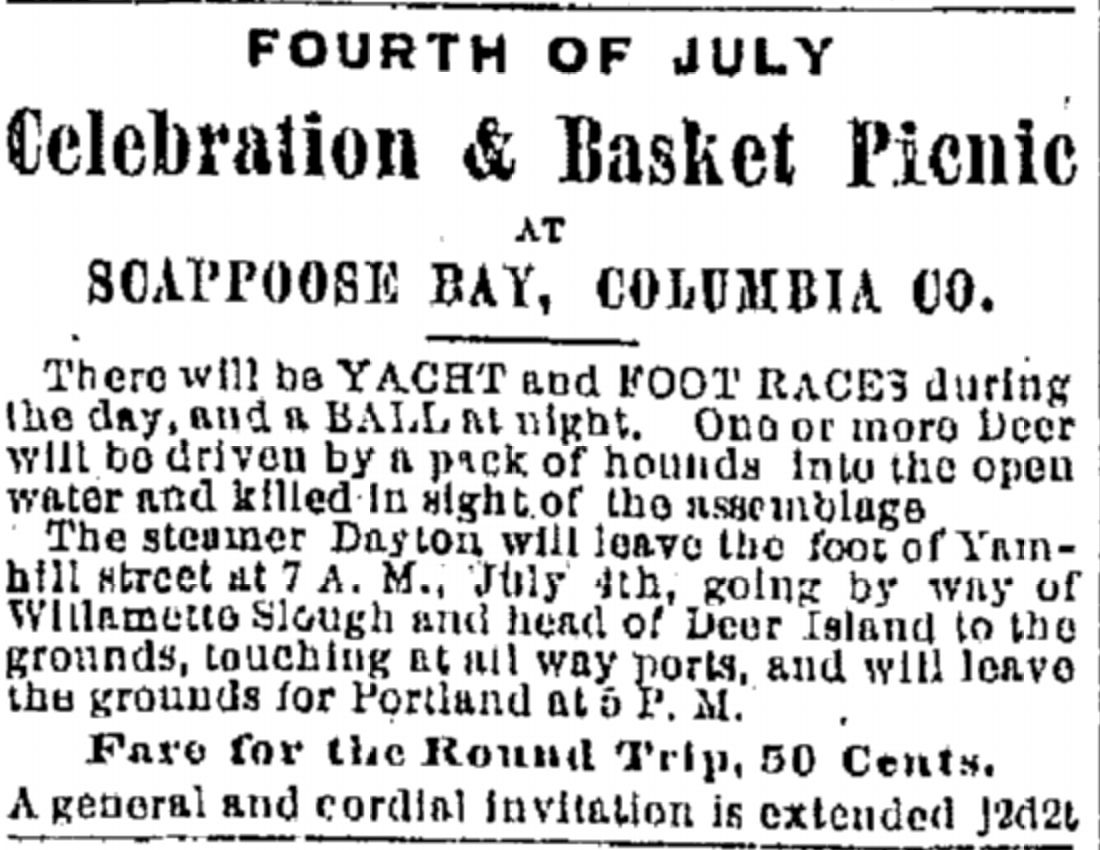
Advertisement for Fourth of July excursion on Dayton, 1879.

On July 3, 1879, Dayton was advertised to be going on an Independence Day excursion to Scappoose Bay, in Columbia County, Oregon. The advertisement promised yacht and foot races during the day and a ball at night. Additionally, it was stated:

One or more deer will be driven by a pack of hounds into the open water and killed in sight of the assemblage.

Dayton would leave on this excursion from the Yamhill street dock on Portland at 7:00 a.m., going to Scappoose Bay via Willamette Slough and the head of Deer Island, stopping on all way ports. Although the ball at night was advertised, Dayton was to depart for Portland at 5:00 p.m. Fare for the round trip was 50 cents.

== Disposition ==
Dayton was dismantled in 1881 or before. According to one newspaper report, dated August 11, 1881, "the steamer Dayton which for several year, has been running on the Cowlitz river route, has been laid on the shelf."

The engines from Dayton went to a new steamer, the Joseph Kellogg, built in 1881.

In March 1882, Dayton and Joseph Kellogg where both mentioned as running for J. Kellogg & Co., was advertised as being on a route that left Portland from a dock at the foot of Yamhill Street, to Freeport, Washington.

However, because the engines of Dayton were removed to power the Joseph Kellogg, the mention of Dayton in the 1882 advertisement appears to have been a printer's error.
