= Rival (sternwheeler) =

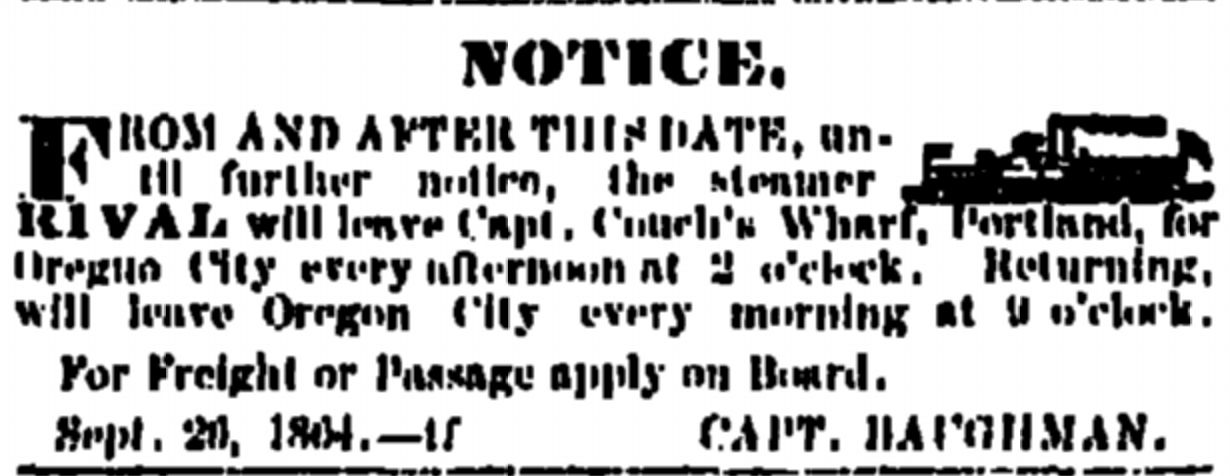
- Advertisement for steamer Rival, February 22, 1865
- Name: Rival (sternwheel steamboat)
- Owner: Dement Bros. and George A. Pease
- In service: 1860
- Identification: U.S. Registry # 21602
- Fate: Dismantled at Portland, Oregon 1868
- Type: shallow draft inland passenger/freighter, all-wood construction
- Tonnage: 211 gross tons
- Length: 110.9 ft (33.8 m)
- Beam: 23.7 ft (7.2 m)
- Depth: 4.7 ft (1.4 m) depth of hold
- Installed power: twin steam engines, horizontally mounted, 12 in (30 cm) bore x 48 in (120 cm) stroke 9.6 net horsepower. nominal
- Propulsion: sternwheel

Rival was a sternwheel steamboat that ran on the Willamette River between Oregon City and Portland, Oregon from 1860 to 1868. Rival was intended to be a boat which would promise low fares in an effort to beat a steamboat monopoly which was then in formation.

== Construction and initial ownership ==
Rival was built at Oregon City, Oregon by William and John Dement, two brothers who were merchants in Oregon City, and Capt. George A. Pease, who became her first captain. There had been a tendency towards steamboat monopolies on the Oregon Rivers in the later 1850s, and the Dement brothers intended Rival as her name suggested, was built to challenge the powerful People's Navigation Company which dominated Willamette River traffic. When launched, Rival was first put on the run from Oregon City to Portland, Oregon. Her announced fares were $2 per ton for freight and 50 cents per head for passengers between terminal points. They were also willing to negotiate long-term contracts.

== Operations ==
Typical freight hauled by a Willamette River steamer in early 1861:
515 boxes of apples, 27 packages produce, 29 boxes eggs and butter, 3 sacks and 66 cases of bacon, 6 packages furs, 1 case fruit trees, 2 bales merchandise, 10 coops chickens.

—Cargo manifest, steamer Rival, February 4, 1861.

Rival's first trip was on July 4, 1860, carrying on the 110.9 ft (33.8 m) the "unbelievable" number of 700 passengers from Oregon City to Vancouver, WA, a distance of 31 miles (50 km) by river, which kept Captain Pease "breathing hard from the time he started until he saw them safely ashore". There was a major flood of the Willamette River in late November and early December 1861. On November 30, the Rival tried to make her regular run from Oregon City to Portland, but was forced to abandon it after going only a few miles. Above Willamette Falls on the same day the steamer Onward started down the river towards Salem, under George Pease, who had sold his interest in Rival to Capt. John T. Apperson, two months after Rival's completion, was now in command of Onward, and what started as a commercial venture that day for Onward turned into one of rescue, as the flood had carried away houses which were floating in the river with their occupants on the roofs.

== Ownership changes ==
Capt. J. T. Apperson having purchased the shares of George Pease in Rival, in turn sold his interest to the People's Transportation Company. The Dements, having failed to break the monopoly, also sold out to Peoples in 1862. Professor Mills as well as the major 19th century work on the topic, both state that Rival was part of the Oregon Steam Navigation Company by 1862, and in that year was turned over to Peoples' in 1862 as part of an anticompetitive agreement between People's and OSN, whereby OSN would stay off the Willamette River, and pay a subsidy to Peoples if People's stayed off the Columbia. While in the service of the People's Transportation Company, Rival was in command of Capt. Ephraim W. Baughman most of the time, and during her last days was used as a spare boat, to take the place of the Senator on the Oregon City route.

== Disposition ==
Rival was dismantled in 1868 at Portland.
