= Onward (1867 sternwheeler) =

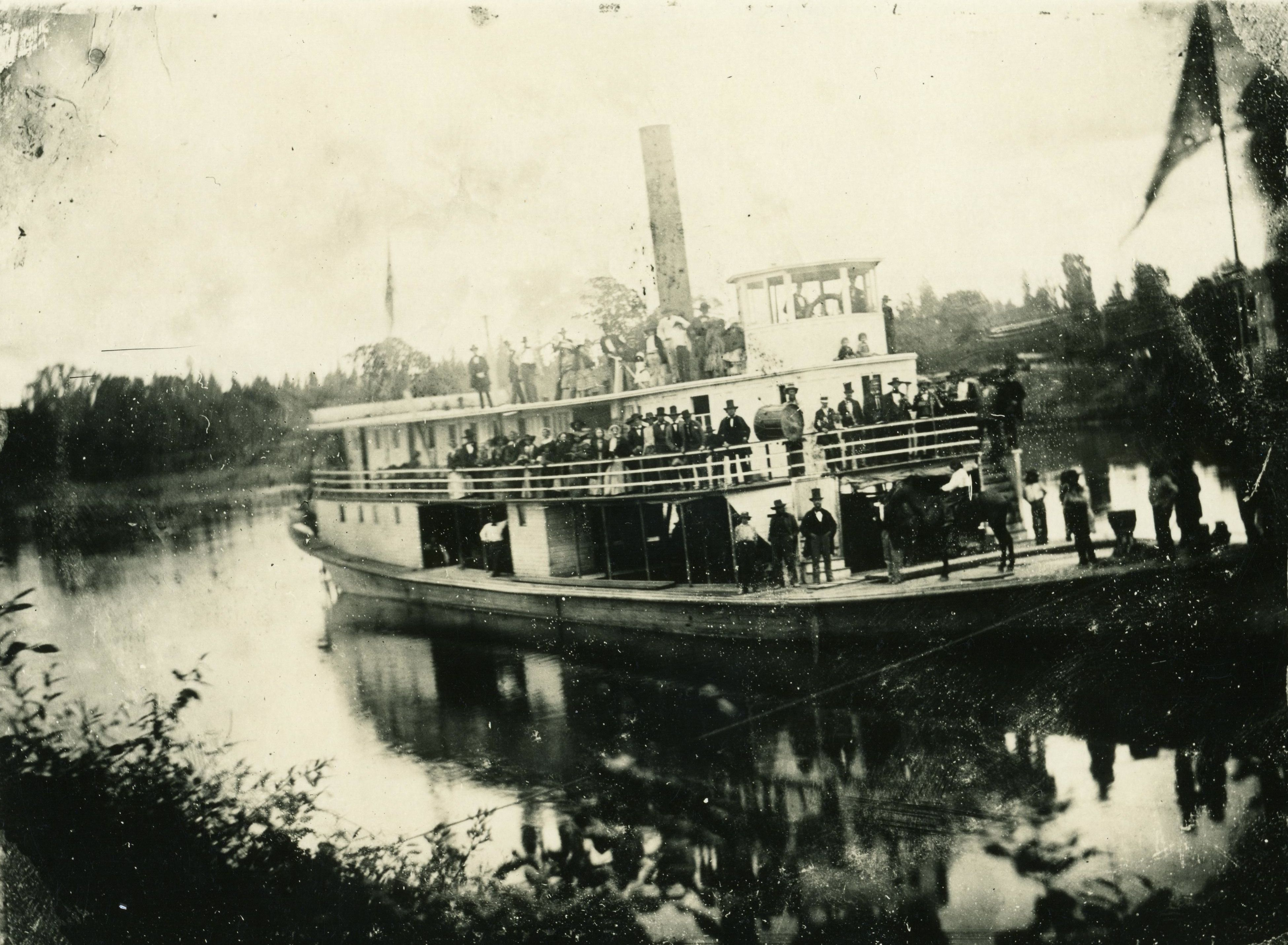
- Steamer Onward

History
- Owner: People's Transportation Company
- Route: Tualatin River, Sucker (Oswego) Lake, Columbia and Lewis rivers
- In service: 1867
- Out of service: 1879
- Identification: U.S. #19274
- Fate: Dismantled

General characteristics
- Class & type: riverine all-purpose
- Tonnage: 155 gross tons; 81 registered tons
- Length: 98 ft (30 m) over hull (exclusive of fantail)
- Beam: 18 ft 4 in (5.59 m) over hull (exclusive of guards)
- Depth: 4 ft 6 in (1.37 m)
- Installed power: twin steam engines, horizontally mounted, each with bore of 10.25 in (260 mm) and stroke of 4 ft (1.2 m).
- Propulsion: stern-wheel

Onward was a stern-wheel driven steamboat that operated on the Tualatin River from 1867 to 1873, on Sucker Lake, now known as Oswego Lake, from 1873 to 1874, on the Cowlitz and Lewis rivers. This vessel should not be confused with the similar sternwheeler Onward built in 1858 at Canemah, Oregon and dismantled in 1865.

== Construction ==
In June 1867, the People's Transportation Company was preparing to build a new steamer at Colfax, on the Tualatin River at about river mile 6, to run to Forest Grove.

The planned steamer would have a keel length of 95 feet, 18 feet beam, and 4 foot, 4 inch depth of hold. The new steamer was reported to be based on the design of the existing steamer Senator.

This appears to have been the steamer Onward reported in another source to have been built in 1867 at a place called Tualatin Landing by C.F. Kent and John Colman for Joseph Kellogg.

== Dimensions ==
Onward was 98 ft (30 m) long, exclusive of the extension of the main deck over the stern, called the “fantail” on which the sternwheel was mounted. The beam (width) of the vessel was 18 ft 4 in (5.59 m). The depth of hold was 4.5 ft (1.4 m). The gross tonnage (a measure of volume and not weight) of the steamer was 155 gross tons and 81 registered tons. The official United States merchant vessel registry number was 19274.

== Engineering ==
Onward was driven by a stern-wheel, turned by twin steam engines, horizontally mounted, each with bore of 10.25 in (260 mm) and stroke of 4 ft (1.2 m).

== Operations ==
Abigail Scott Duniway travelled on the Onward in August 1874, and described the operation of the vessel in her newspaper The New Northwest:

The little steamer is one of those which Dr. Haskell calls a “kick up behind,” being long and narrow, and consequently well suited to the navigation of the far-famed Slough of the Willamette and Columbia, and more especially to the narrow channels of the Lewis and Cowlitz rivers, where the captain draws a ‘bead’ on the current, and makes a hair trigger of the helm, and its, by dint of long practices, enabled to graze and barely pass the peeping and sunken snags which lie in wait to deceive the unwary on all our western water courses.

=== Tualatin River route ===
The Tualatin River flows into the Willamette River a few miles south of Oregon City. In its natural state, from the mouth of the Tualatin upstream for distance, there was a stretch of rapids with a fall of about 50 feet. From the head of the rapids however shallow draft boats could run up the river to a point about 12 miles upriver from Hillsboro, Oregon. The river was slow moving with many bends.

Near the Tualatin at its lower end was Sucker Lake, as Oswego Lake was then known. Sucker Lake at its nearest was about one mile distant from the Tualatin River. A tramway had been built between Sucker Lake and the Tualatin River, which carried heavier freight between the two bodies of water.

In February 1869, there were the following landings on the Tualatin River: Farmington Landing, Harris’s Landing, Hillsboro, Centerville, and Forest Grove.

=== Sucker Lake and Tualatin River service ===
As of May 2, 1868, Onward was running regular trips on the Tualatin between Hillboro and Colfax. Onward operated with a crew entirely from the Kellogg family: Charles Kellogg, master; Elijah Kellogg, engineer; Orrin Kellogg, purser. According to other reports, Captain Ed. Kellogg was in charge of Onward, while Elisha Kellogg was the engineer and Orrin Kellogg (b.1845) was general superintendent and purser.

At Colfax, a connection was made with the tramway belonging to the milling company, which ran to the eastern side of Sucker Lake, where another connection was made with a steamer owned by the same company running on the lake. This steamer then ran across the lake to Oswego, located on a portage between the lake and the Willamette River.

The cargo was then unloaded from the steamer, then hauled by team down the portage to the Willamette River, where the cargo would be picked up by a steamer of the People’s Transportation Company.

Although the trip required cargo to be handled 10 times, it was still considered superior, in 1868, to hauling over the hilly divide between Portland and the Tualatin plains.

== Forest Grove run ==
In the week before December 19, 1868, the steamer Onward was able to proceed from Colfax up the Tualatin River to Forest Grove and back. Although the water was very low, and navigation was difficult, it was expected to become easier soon, and another run was planned for Saturday, December 26, 1868. Reportedly a large amount of grain had been accumulated at points along the river, waiting for higher water so it could be shipped.

In January 1869, the people of Centreville, Oregon were raising money by subscription for the purpose of clearing out Dairy Creek, near Hillsboro, Oregon, to make it navigable for the Onward.

In December 1872, Onward was reported to be “slowly working her way up the Tualatin river.” A large amount of wheat had been harvested, and was being stored at Hillsboro, waiting for the rains to come to raise the river’s water level to allow steamer navigation.

In 1873, after a canal was completed between the Tualatin river and the eastern end of Sucker Lake, Onward operated on both bodies of water until 1874, when the steamer was brought overland to the Willamette through the portage at Oswego.

=== Sale of Onward ===
On March 18, 1874, James D. Miller and C.P. Church purchased Onward, which was then lying in the Tualatin river about 4 miles upriver from the diversion dam built for Moore’s Mill. Miller intended to use Onward on the run on the Columbia to the Cascades, but the steamer turned out not to have enough power.

The steamer had also been sold at about the same time for $2,000, which was reported to be “not the value of her machinery.”

=== Transfer to Willamette ===
On April 10, 1874, it was reported that the week before, three young men who had been hired by Capt. Sebastian “Bas” Miller to help bring the Onward out of the Tualatin, had nearly drowned when their skiff encountered a line stretched across the Tualatin, which caught their boat and capsized it. The men managed to reach a log, which they held onto until 9:00 a.m. the next day, when they were rescued by Captain Milled.

On April 18, 1874, the Onward was reported to have been transferred from the Tualatin River to the Willamette River. The steamer was also said to have been “transported” from the Tualatin to the Willamette. According to later testimony of James D. Miller, the new owner, he had brought Onward down to the Willamette through the unnavigable rapids at the mouth of the Tualatin through the use of a coffer dam.

=== Lewis River operations ===
In August 1874, Onward was running a route between Portland and the Lewis River. The steamer is also reported to have been running from Portland, to Cathlamet, W.T.

Onward is reported to have passed into the control of the Oregon Steam Navigation Company in 1875, with the O.S.N. having subsequently worn the steamer out. While there is a report that Onward was transferred to the Umpqua River in 1875, this appears to be an error.

On the Sunday before December 14, 1877, while Onward, laden with groceries, hay and other cargo, was returning from the Cowlitz River, the steamer struck a snag at the month of Blind Slough, and sank in 12 feet of water.

== Disposition ==
On January 26, 1879, it was reported that the engines from the steamer Onward had been sold to be installed into a new steamer to be built for traffic between The Dalles and the head of the Cascades Rapids, on the Columbia River.
