= People's Transportation Company =

Defunct steamboat company that operated in Oregon, United States

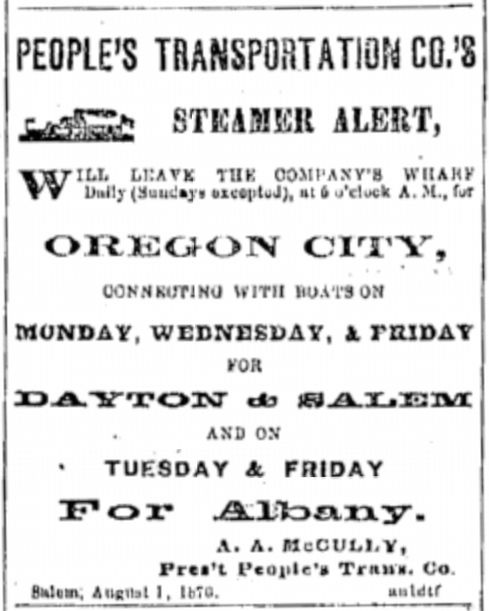
- Founded: 1861
- Defunct: 1871
- Fate: sold to Ben Holladay
- Successor: Ben Holladay
- Headquarters: Portland, Oregon

The People's Transportation Company operated steamboats on the Willamette River and its tributaries, the Yamhill and Tualatin rivers, in the State of Oregon from 1862 to 1871. For a brief time this company operated steamers on the Columbia River, and for about two months in 1864, the company operated a small steamer on the Clackamas River.

== Formation of the company ==
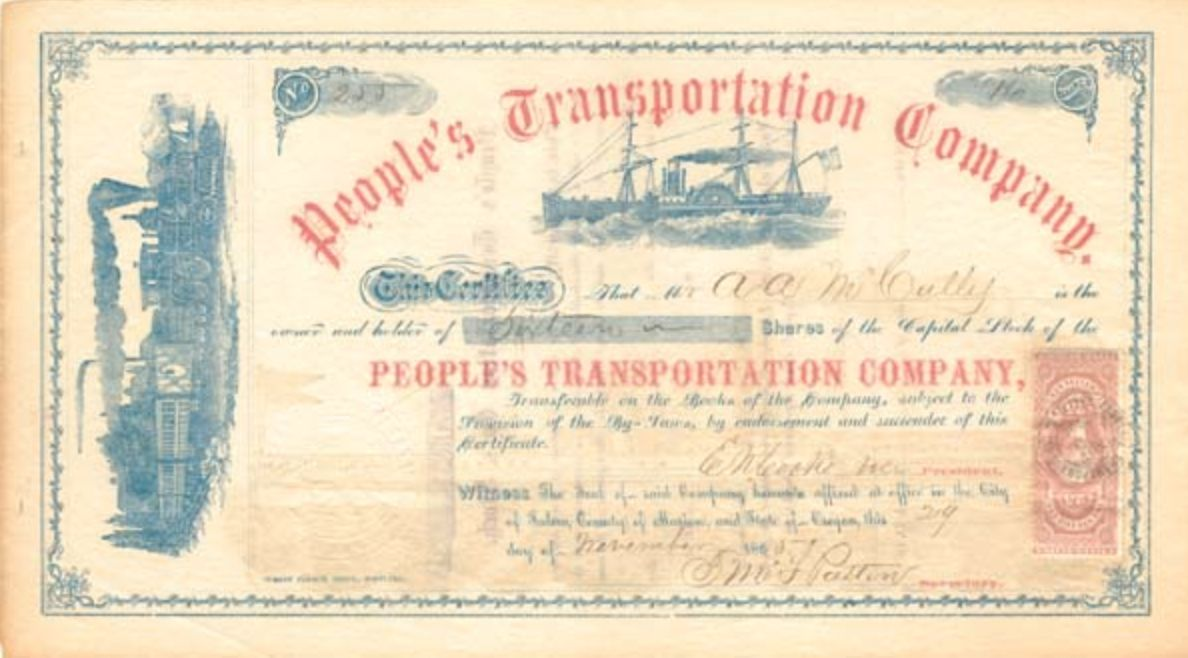
Stock certificate of the People's Transportation Company, issued to Asa A. McCully.

The People's Transportation Company, often called the P.T. Company, was organized in 1862 to compete with the Oregon Steam Navigation Company, commonly known as the O.S.N. Almost every steamboat man not associated with O.S.N. were either founders of the P.T. Company, or were afterwards associated with it.

The principals in the founding of the P.T. company were two brothers, both businessmen and farmers: Asa Alfred McCully (1818–1886) and David McCully (b.1814). Other officers were Stephen T. Church (1829–1871); Edwin N. Cook (or Cooke) (1810–1879), businessman and Oregon State Treasurer from 1862 to 1870; steamboat captain Ephraim W. Baughman; businessman and politician Stephen Coffin; and master shipbuilder John D. Biles. There were about 65 stockholders. Stephen Coffin was the first president, and Edwin Cook and the McCully brothers were directors. The McCullys, who were heavy shippers in the Willamette Valley, had invested $3,000 into a steamer, the James Clinton to assure access to river shipping free of monopoly control.

== Success on the Willamette River ==
In the spring of 1863, development of mines east of the Cascades Mountains created a demand for shipping on the Columbia River. The P.T. Company, wishing to take advantage of this, built the sidewheeler Iris at The Dalles, Oregon, to run in competition with the O.S.N. sidewheeler Idaho on the short stretch of the Columbia River between the Cascades and Celilo Rapids.

For service above the falls, the P.T. Company made arrangements with the owners of two steamers built the previous year, Spray and Kiyus, to carry passengers and freight further up the Columbia and then the Snake rivers, to Lewiston, Idaho, which was the jump-off point for the mines. O.S.N. had a portage railway to carry freight around Celilo Falls, which they refused to allow P.T. Co. to use, forcing P.T. Co. to haul freight on wagons around the falls, a much less effective means.

The P.T. company then began a rate war with the O.S.N.

Achieving some success, the new company began expanding operations to the Columbia River. The P.T. Company put the E.D. Baker on the lower Columbia, the Iris on the middle, and the Kiyus on the upper Columbia.

== Competition on the Columbia ==
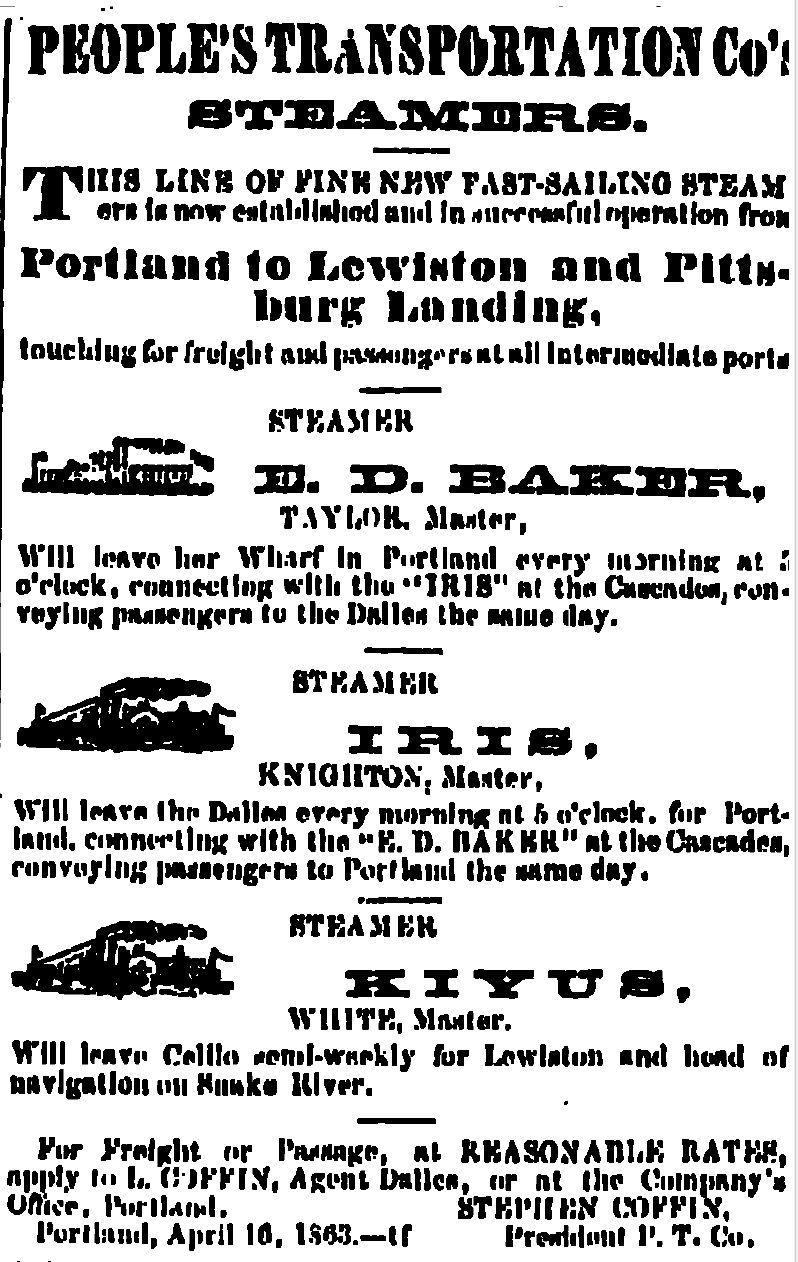
P. T. Company advertisement placed May 7, 1863, during competition with Oregon Steam Navigation Company on the Columbia and Snake rivers.

In March 1863, the P.T. Company's new steamers, the Colonel Baker, also known as the E.D. Baker, and the Cayuse, also known as the Kiyus, were nearing completion, and expected to be finished by April 1. The Baker, being built at Vancouver, W.T. would run under Captain Hakes, the Iris under H.M. Knighton, and Cayuse / Kiyus under Leonard White. At the same time, the steamer Reliance was said to be in a position to begin running on the Willamette River upstream from the falls.

The P.T. boats posed serious competition to the O.S.N. on the Columbia, which placed the Wilson G. Hunt on the Portland-Cascades route to run against them. The E.D. Baker was considered the crack boat of the P.T. line, and one of the fastest yet placed on the Columbia, was often able to outrun Wilson G. Hunt, an older sidewheeler which had been brought around Cape Horn from the east coast.

Many years later, the experienced steamboat man William Polk Gray (1845–1929) recalled that the public favored the underdog, as he characterized the People's Transportation Company:

But the sympathy of the people is always with the under dog in the fight. One trip two steamers were in Lewiston ready to start down the river. The Oregon Steam Navigation Company steamer Tenino offered to take passengers down from Lewiston to Portland free; the People's Transportation Company charged $5; 125 passengers went on the Kiyus and ten deadheads on the Tenino.

In May 1863, as a result of the opposition of the P.T. Company, fares from Portland to The Dalles were reduced to $1.00. From Celilo, Oregon to Lewiston, Idaho the fare was $5.00, running on the Kiyus, then under the command of Capt. Leonard White, with two brothers Alonzo “Lon” Vickers (d.1893) and E. Vickers (b.1844) on board as engineers.

== The steamer Enterprise acquired ==
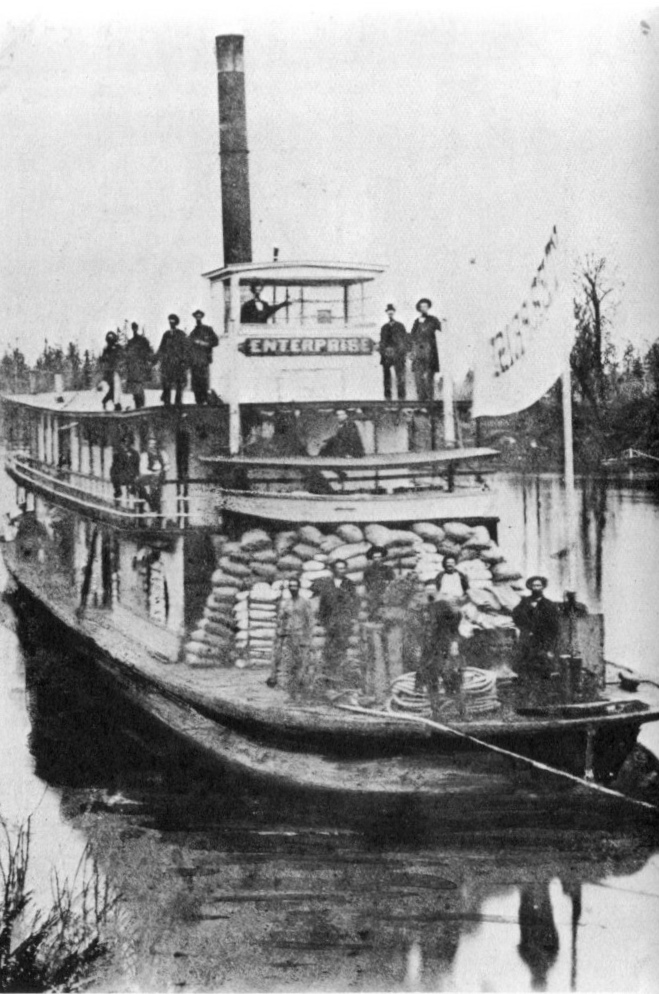
The steamer Enterprise, built 1863.

In 1863, a new independent steamer, the Enterprise, was built at Canemah by Capt. George A. Pease, backed by a company formed by Capt. Charles. W. Pope (1831–1871), Capt. Nat H. Lane Sr. (1823–1878), C. Friendly, Judge Riley E. Stratton, C. Crawford, James Wilson, C.W. Rea, and S. Ellsworth. Enterprise, the second steamer of this name to operate on the Willamette, was launched in November 1863, and ran independently for a short time under George Pease. Soon an accommodation was reached with the P.T. Company, after which Pease remained in command for over two years. In 1866, the P.T. purchased Enterprise outright from its original owners.

Enterprise was highly successful financially, earning a 33.3% profit in its first year of operations, and 66.6% in the second year, with a dividend of $50 a share, When Enterprise was purchased by P.T. Co., the original owners received $280 in P.T. stock for every $100 of Enterprise stock.

== Reorganization and settlement with O.S.N. ==
O.S.N retaliated against the P.T. Co. by placing its own boats, Rival and Onward on the Willamette.

The competition had caused the P.T. Company to lose all its surplus and sustain debts of $65,000. The company reorganized as a result, with the following officers: David McCully, president and director; L.S. Parrish, vice president; Thomas McF. (McFadden) Patton (1829–1892), a lawyer, secretary and director; J.S. Parrish, John D. Biles, Edwin N. Cooke, and S.T. Church, additional directors.

In about 1864 as the P.T. Company was seeking to raise funds to resolve the debt issue, O.S.N., through its banker, William S. Ladd, initiated negotiations which led to O.S.N. paying the P.T. Company $10,000 a year to confine its operations to the Willamette River. The strong performance of the P.T. Company's E.D. Baker probably induced O.S.N. to negotiate.

The Oregon Steam Navigation Company also picked up People's Transportation's boats Iris and Kiyus, in exchange for three OSN boats on the Willamette River, Onward, Rival, and Surprise. With the settlement reached, passenger and freight rates on the Columbia, under complete O.S.N. domination, soon more than tripled. It took three years for the P.T. Company to be able to declare, in 1865, a dividend on their stock.

In December 1863, the E.D. Baker was dismantled, with the machinery and upper works being sent to Canemah, to be used on a new hull being built there by the P.T. Company. This new vessel was the Reliance. The hull of the Baker, once repaired from the sinking at Oswego, would be converted into a wharfboat or a barge.

== Challenge from Willamette Steam Navigation Company ==
Occasionally rivals on the Willamette River would arise in competition to the P.T. Company. One of the more serious challenges arose in October 1865, when the Willamette Steam Navigation Company was incorporated, with D.W. Burnside as president, Asa L. Lovejoy, vice-president, and John T. Apperson, secretary.

Willamette Steam built the steamer Alert at Oswego and placed it on the run from Portland to Oregon City. The new company also built, at Canemah, the steamer Active, and gained control of the upper Willamette steamer Echo, which John Gates (1827–1888) and Captain Alexander P. Ankeny (1813–1891) had built at Canemah, running both on the upper Willamette against the P.T. Company.

Fares dropped fast, so that a passenger could go from Portland to Oregon City for free, then on to Salem fifty cents, with meals and berth free, and then on to Albany for one dollar and to Corvallis for $1.50. Freight rates dropped to fifty cents per ton for shipments from Portland to Oregon City. The steamboats of the rival companies tested their speed against each other on a daily basis. On one occasion, the Active and the Reliance, a P.T. Company boat, raced all the way from Canemah to Salem. The speed contests between Reliance and Active were remembered many years later by one old steamboat man as the “most exciting boat racing I have ever seen.”

By March 1866, the competition had grown too much for both companies, and they decided to merge. The officers of the merged company were Asa A. McCully, president; S.T. Church, secretary; Joseph Kellogg, Capt. Lucien E. Pratt (1824–1899), George Anson Pease (1830–1918), and E.N. Cooke, directors. John D. Biles was the company's agent.

== Construction of the boat basin at Oregon City ==
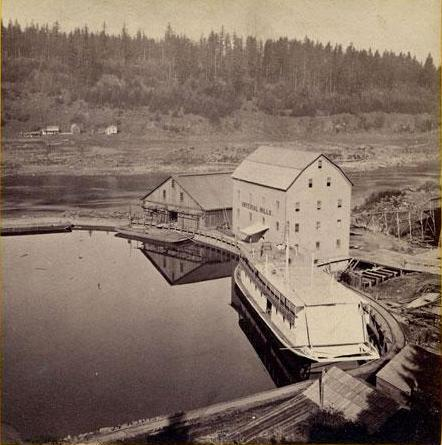
The newly constructed boat basin at Oregon City in 1867. Note the steamer under construction. A portion of the mule-drawn tramway to permit expeditious transfer of freight between the upper and lower Willamette can be seen running along the side the boat basin.

On August 15, 1865, the P.T. Company began construction of a boat basin at Oregon City. Once complete, the basin would bring the boats of the company, above and below the falls, to within 50 feet of each other.

The dam along the falls was built of 14 inch timber frames, each six feet long, and secured into the rock of the falls by iron bolts through the frame sills. The frames were covered with three inch planks, with the overall structure about 1000 feet long, and about 12 feet high, creating a basin with a water depth of from six to eight feet in a space of about 500 feet long by 300 feet wide.

The construction work was supervised for the P.T. Company by Capt. Joseph Kellogg. The work was completed on November 15, 1866, and as many as four of the company's steamers could use the basin at one time. The company was reported to have spent $100,000 building the basin and the weir.

The company had also constructed a weir along the top of the falls, which had the effect of raising the water level on the river a few feet during low water, which allowed steamboat navigation to proceed.

By November 1865, work had nearly been completed on a warehouse for the company at the boat basin, which would have an inclined railway allowing ready transfer of freight to and from boats on the lower and the upper river.

On February 3, 1866, it was reported that a few days earlier, an employee of the P.T. Company, G.B. Daley, a Wisconsin native who had served under Sherman in the Civil War was drowned in the boat basin, on account of the swamping of a small boat that he had been in.

== Monopoly on the Willamette ==
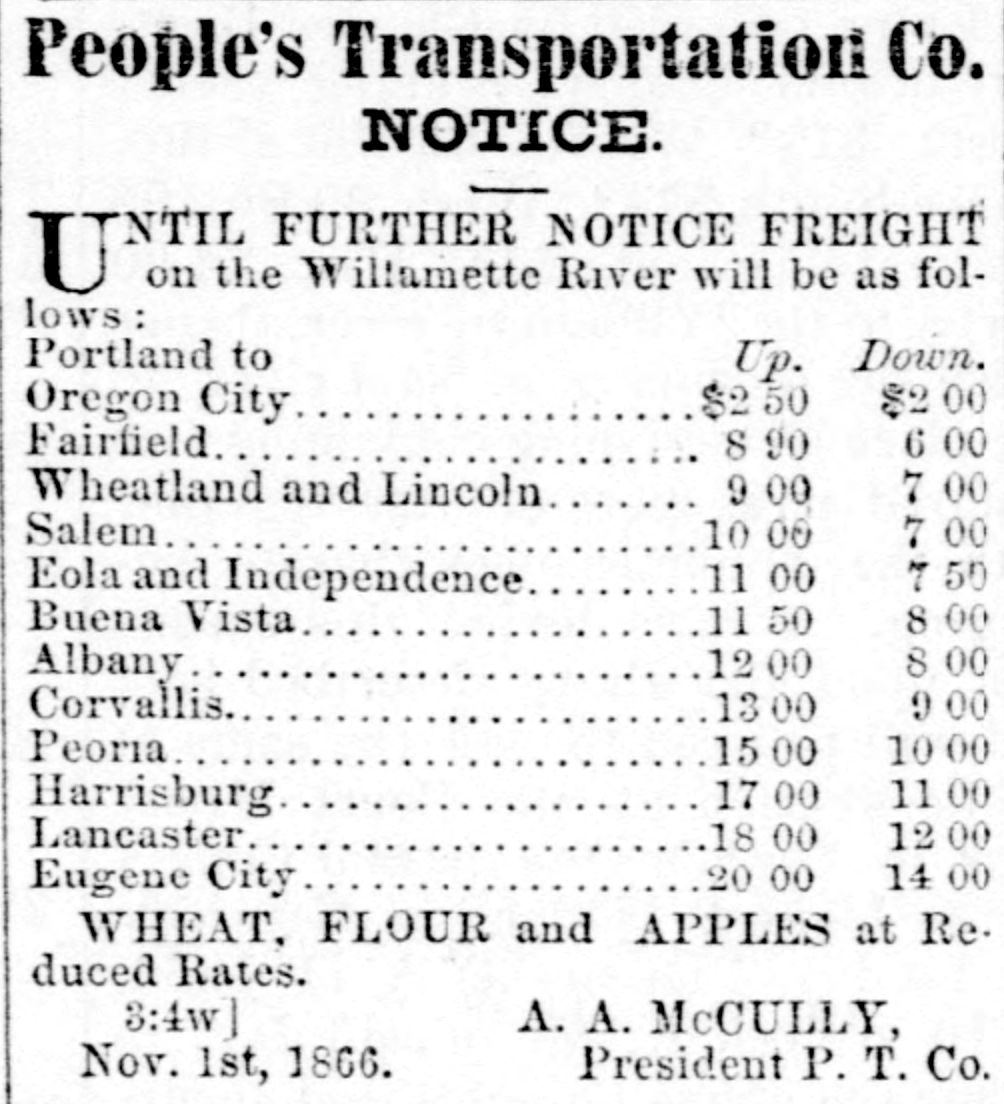
Notice of freight rates, effective Nov. 1, 1866, for the People's Transportation Company.

For ten years, O.S.N. and the P.T. Company abided by their agreement.

In 1864, Capt. Joseph Kellogg merged his operations into the company, bringing in the steamer Senator which ran between Portland and Oregon City.

In November 1866, the P.T. Company was running Senator out of Portland, departing daily except Sundays at 6:00 a.m. for Oregon City, where connections were made with Enterprise, Echo, and Active, which ran on Mondays and Thursdays for Salem, Albany, and Corvallis. Senator departed Oregon City at 1:00 p.m. on the return trip to Portland. From Oregon City, the Union departed up river on Mondays, Wednesdays, and Fridays for Dayton on the Yamhill River and waypoints.

Upriver from Oregon City, in November 1866, the company promised service to the following landings: Fairfield, Wheatland, Lincoln, Salem, Eola, Independence, Buena Vista, Albany, Corvallis, Peoria, Harrisburg, Lancaster and Eugene City.

In November 1866, the P.T. Company's lowest upriver freight rate (rates were slightly lower going downriver) was $2.50 per ton for freight shipped from Portland to Oregon City. Once transshipment occurred at Oregon City, freight rates increased rapidly, starting with Fairfield, at $8.90 per ton, and going up to $12 per ton for freight shipped to Albany, and $20 per ton for freight to Eugene. The company's actual transshipment costs were reported to be 11 cents a ton in early 1869. The company did promise reduced rates for wheat, flour, and apples.

In December 1866, Asa Alfred McCully (1818–1886) was president of the company. Other officers, elected at the December 6, 1866 stockholders meeting in Salem, were Edwin N. Cooke, vice-president, Joseph Kelly, George A. Pease, and L.E. Pratt, directors, S.T. Church, secretary, and George Marshall, Chief Engineer. The company was reported, in December 1866, to have earned revenue of $19,000, even after paying expenses.

In December 1866, under the winter shipping arrangements of the company, the steamer Alert departed Portland daily at 7:00 a.m., for Oregon City, where it connected with steamers running to points on the upper Willamette River, upstream from Willamette Falls. The Reliance ran on Mondays and Thursdays to Corvallis, Oregon; the Fannie Patton ran to the same city on Tuesdays and Fridays; the Active ran every Wednesday for Harrisburg, Lancaster, and Eugene; and Union ran on Mondays, Wednesdays and Fridays for Dayton and Lafayette on the Yamhill River.

== Criticism by Albany newspaper ==
By late December 1866, The People's Transportation Company achieved a monopoly over transport on the Willamette River, for which it was criticized in the State Rights Democrat, of Albany, Oregon, as a “heartless, soulless, monied monopoly, and true to the ancestral fame of all monopolies, they pluck the public goose while they can, because just now they have the power.”

A week later, Martin H. Abbott, editor of the State Rights Democrat wrote that the freight and passenger rates ought to be reduced by at least one-half. According to the State Rights Democrat, one-way passage from Albany to Portland cost $5.50, with meals and lodging included.

In another December 1866 editorial, Abbott claimed that the previous year, Capt. Alexander P. Ankeny, running a boat in opposition to the P.T. Company had charged only $4.00 per ton for freight shipped from Portland to Albany, and repeated a report that Ankeny had still run at a profit.

Abbott stated that Linn County, Oregon paid annually, for freight, to the P.T. Company, $100,000 to $150,000, which, in Abbott's opinion was $75,000 to $100,000 too much, given the rates charged by Captain Ankeny the year before, According to Abbott it was “nor any wonder that men who, a few years ago, were as poor as diluted skim-milk, are now among millionaires.”

== Navigation of the Tualatin River and Oswego Lake ==
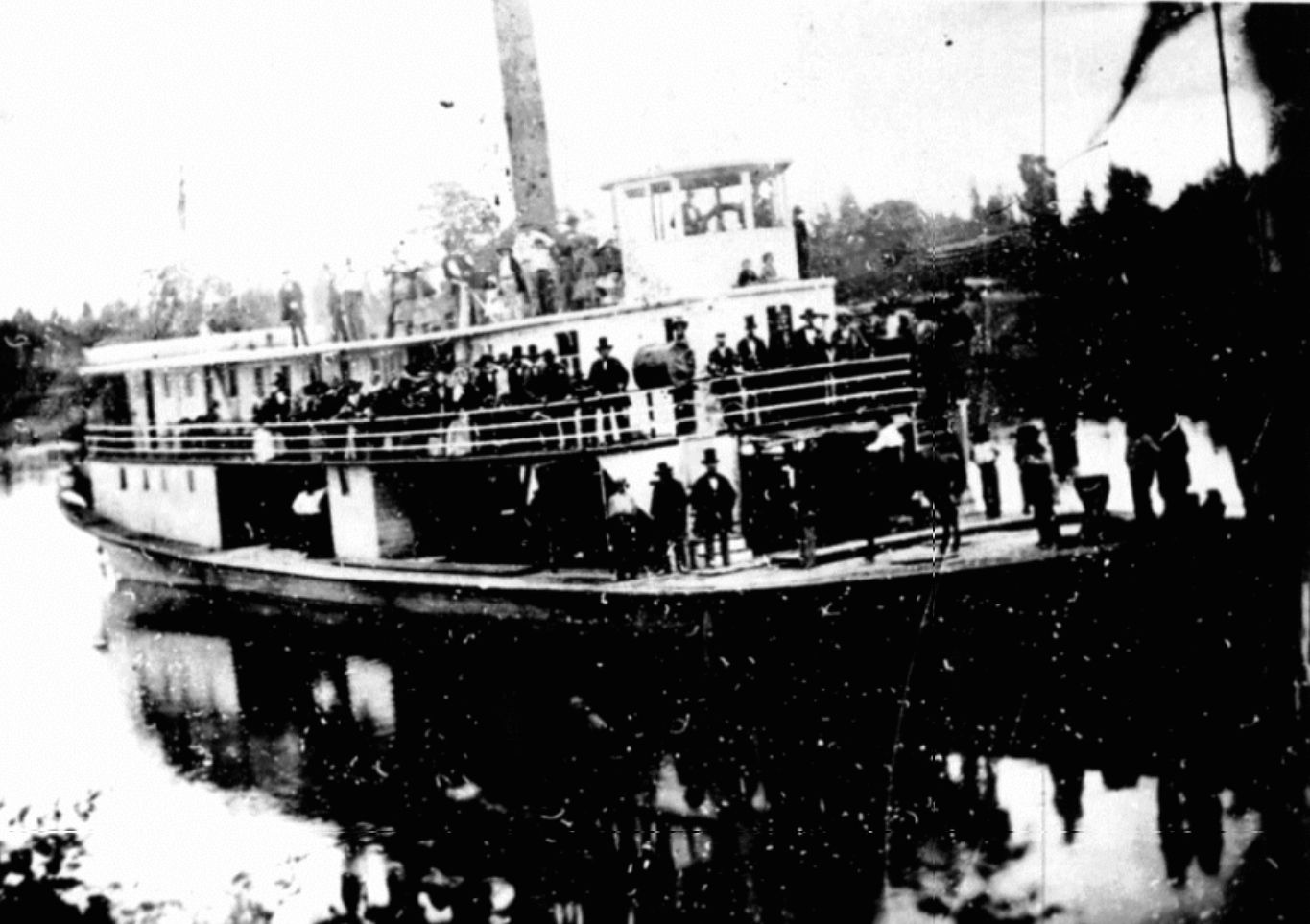
The steamer Onward, built to navigate the Tualatin River.

From approximately 1866 to 1872, the P.T. Company, or its close affiliates, the Kellogg brothers (Joseph and Edward), operated steamboats, including the Yamhill and Onward on the Tualatin River, running to Hillsboro and even further, to a landing about 2.5 miles from Forest Grove.

In 1869, the Kelloggs, with W.S. Failing, W.D. Hare, J.M. Moore, and Capt. J.D. Merryman, organized the Tualatin River Navigation and Manufacturing Company, which, in 1869, built the small sternwheeler Henrietta at Colfax for the trade on Oswego or Sucker Lake, as it was then called. Henrietta, whose hull was just 54 feet long, acted as feeder for Onward on the Tualatin. Onward in turn acted as feeder for the P.T. Company's boats on the Willamette River.

In late June, 1867, the P.T. Company was building new steamers at Canemah. The dimensions of the hull of the new steamer were to be: length 126 feet 10 inches; beam 28 feet; depth of hold 3.5 feet. The builders were William Mullan and Joseph Paquet. The new vessel was intended to be a light draught boat, and was to have an appearance similar to that of the Reliance. By June 29, 1867, the hull frames had been set up and planking was about to begin.

At the same time, the company was preparing to build a new steamer at Colfax, on the Tualatin River at about river mile 6, to run to Forest Grove. The planned steamer would have a keel length of 95 feet, 18 feet beam, and 4 foot, 4 inch depth of hold. The new steamer was reported to be based on the design of the existing steamer Senator. This appears to have been the steamer Onward, reported in another source to have been built in 1867 at a place called Tualatin Landing by C.F. Kent and John Colman for Joseph Kellogg. Onward operated with a crew entirely from the Kellogg family: Charles Kellogg, master; Elijah Kellogg, engineer; Orrin Kellogg, purser.

In the week before December 19, 1868, the steamer Onward was able to proceed from Colfax up the Tualatin River to Forest Grove and back. Although the water was very low, and navigation was difficult, it was expected to become easier soon, and another run was planned for Saturday, December 26, 1868. Reportedly a large amount of grain had been accumulated at points along the river, waiting for higher water so it could be shipped.

== Later operations ==
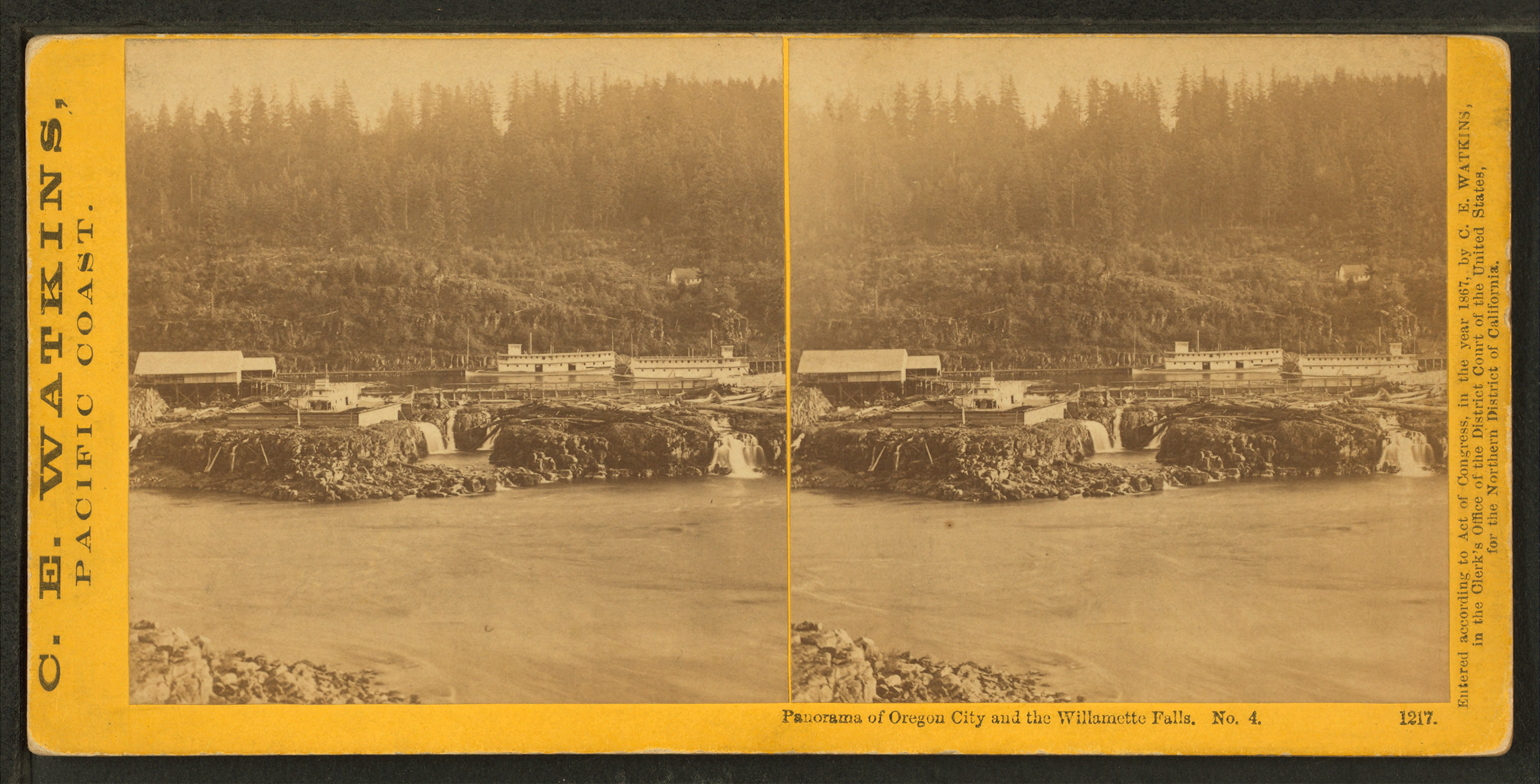
Stereocard photograph of Carleton Watkins, showing steamers in 1867 at the P.T. Company boat basin. One steamer on left is in the drydock. Probably all vessels shown belonged to the People's Transportation Company.

On June 30, 1867, the company was reported to have recently completed a drydock at Oregon City. The steamer Active was floated out, and the Echo floated in, and thirty-five minutes later, Echo was resting out of the water dry on the shipways.

In July 1867, the P.T. Company began a project of building barges, called “lighters” to be lashed alongside its steamers on the shallow upper Willamette during the summer period of low water on the river. The plan was that by dividing the freight between the steamer and the barges, less water would be needed to float the steamer.

In 1867, the People's Transportation Company advertised freight service to McMinnville at a rate of $7.00 per ton. Also in September 1867, the steamers Enterprise and Echo were reported to be able to make regular trips to Albany because navigation obstacles in the river had been removed. The P.T. Company was building a new shallow-draft steamer at Canemah in September 1867. Echo was reported to have beaten the stage coach a good part of the way to Salem.

In January, 1868 the P.T. Company let a building contract to Joseph Paquet to build, at Canemah, a new steamer to run between Oregon City and McMinnville, Oregon on the Yamhill River, to be completed in time for the fall trade when the rivers would rise sufficiently to allow navigation. On Saturday, August 8, 1868, the new steamer was launched, and given the name Dayton.

The steamer Albany was also constructed in 1868, at a reported cost of $30,000, and was ready to take on the summer trade. It was said that Albany, with a “fair load” of cargo, drew only 20 inches of water.

A new challenge arose to the line when the steamer Success was built at Canemah for the Canemah Transportation Company, launched on July 15, and entering operations the next month, on August 11, 1868. Despite its name, the steamer was not a success financially, and February 1869, it was transferred to the P.T. Company, ending competition at that time, or “opposition” as it was then called, on the Willamette river.

An annual meeting of the shareholders of the People's Transportation Company was scheduled to be held at 10:00 a.m. on December 3, 1868, at the company's office in Salem, Oregon, at which time directors for the next year were to be chosen and a reduction in the company's capital stock was to be considered. The notice for the meeting was given by the company's secretary, S.T. Church.

== Projected construction of canal ==
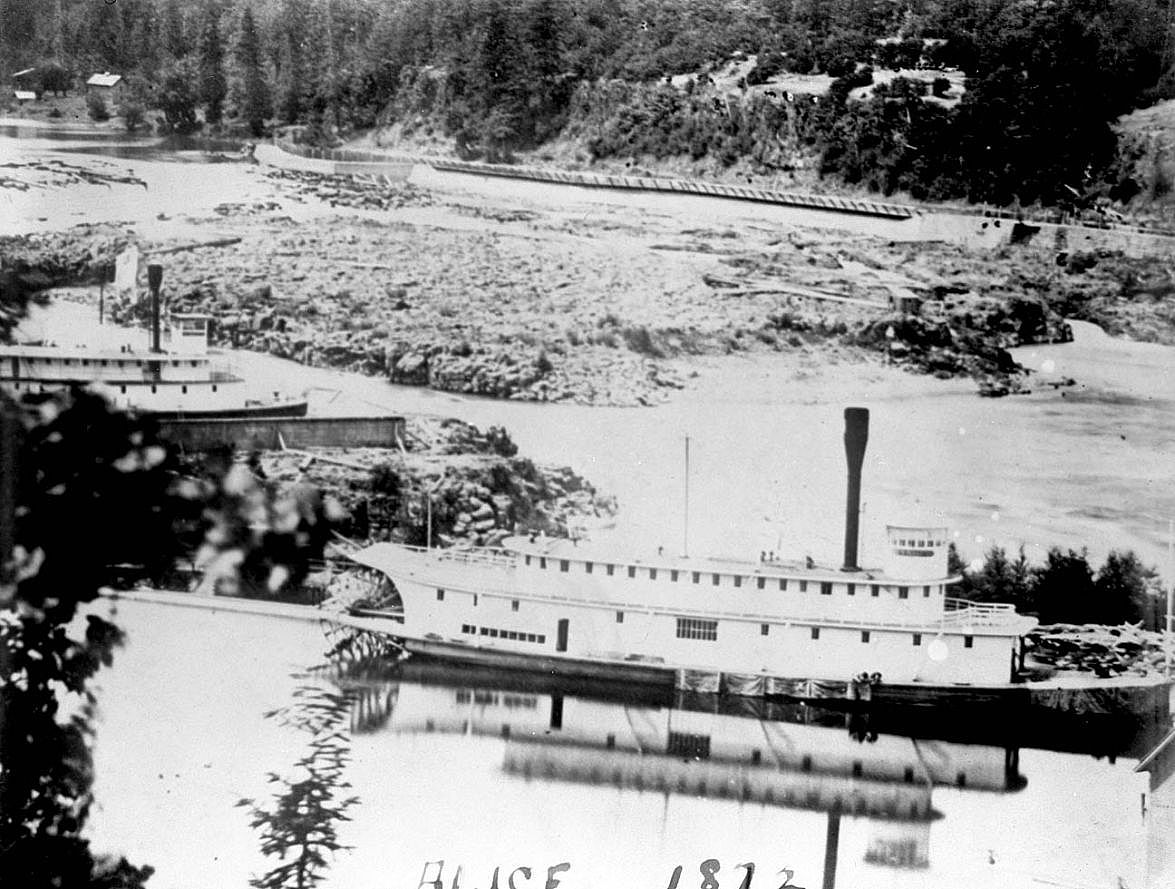
Steamers Alice, center, and Albany at left, in drydock, circa 1874. Across the falls can be seen the new ship canal, built by the P.T. Company's competitor, the Willamette Falls Canal and Locks Company.

For some time, the People's Transportation Company had considered whether to build a shipping canal and lock at Oregon City. The plan, however, was to build the works on the east side of Willamette Falls, rather than the west side, as eventually proved to be the case.

In November 1865, the P.T. Company's engineer, Colonel Belden, was reported to have drawn up plans and prepared cost estimates for a canal and locks to run on the east side of the falls, connecting the company's newly completed boat basin with the lower river. The locks designed by Colonel Belden would have allowed the transit of boats 170 feet long, and were to be 40 feet wide and have at least 6 feet of water over the foundation component under the lock entrance, called the “miter sill.” There would be 8 feet of lift to each lock. The P.T. Company did not plan to build the locks immediately, and was waiting for a time when business demand would be sufficient to support the project.

In January, 1869, further details were reported on the P.T. Company's proposed locks. According to the news report, the P.T. company intended to commence work during the coming construction season, that is, of 1869. The company contemplated building a total of five locks, four of which would be 200 feet long, and the fifth one would be a guard lock, placed at the top of the works by the boat basin, to protect against high water, floating logs and trees, and other things that could damage the lifting locks. Several contractors were then corresponding with the company about taking on the work.

In March 1869, the P.T. Company was reported to be petitioning the Oregon City council for a right of way through part of the city for the canal to be built by the company.

On August 17, 1869, the company was reported to have over 50 men engaged in blasting work on the canal, which was reportedly to be finished that year.

According to George A. Pease, a director and major shareholder of the P.T. Company, the Willamette Falls Canal and Locks Company was organized to build locks and a canal around Willamette Falls, in opposition to the P.T. Company, which controlled the portage. The P.T. Company offered to build the locks on the Oregon City side of the falls for a $125,000 subsidy from the State of Oregon, but the offer was made too late for it to be approved by the legislature.

== Sale to Ben Holladay ==
In January 1871, the P.T. Company's steamers carried down to Oregon City, from upriver points, 5000 tons of freight. By this time, the P.T. Company was facing new competition on the Willamette River, from the Willamette Locks & Transportation Company, which engaged in serious efforts to construct a shipping canal around the Willamette Falls, but was also running, or preparing to run, steamers against the P.T. Company.

In September, 1871 the empire-building stage coach businessman Ben Holladay incorporated a company with the objective of acquiring the People's Transportation Company. The officers of the new company were Ben Holladay, president; Ben Holladay Jr., vice-president; John D. Biles, secretary and treasurer, and George Pease, superintendent. Holladay wanted to acquire the P.T. Company to prevent its steamboats from completing with a railroad he was building south through the Willamette Valley, with the objective of reaching California.

On September 6, 1871, the People's Transportation Company, apprehensive that the pending completion of the locks at Oregon City would bring a new challenge to its near-ten year monopoly, voted to dissolve the corporation and sell all its assets to Hollday's company, the Oregon and California Railroad, for $200,000. These included the following steamers: Albany, Alert, Alice, Dayton, Fanny Patton, Reliance, Senator, Shoo Fly, and Success.

Of these vessels, Dayton, Albany, and Success, operated upriver from Willamette Falls. The upriver vessels connected at Oregon City with the Alert and Senator, both running to Portland.

During its existence, the People's Transportation Company had spent over one million dollars for steamboats, docks, and improvement.

== Steamers owned by the line ==
All boats were wooden sternwheelers, except Iris and Yamhill, which were sidewheelers. This list includes boats operated by the Tualatin River Navigation and Manufacturing Company.

- Active, built 1865 at Canemah by John T. Apperson for the Willamette Steam Navigation Company. Transferred to the Oregon Steamship Co. (Ben Holladay) in 1871, dismantled 1872 at Canemah.
- Albany, built 1868 at Canemah for the P.T. Company, transferred 1871 to the Oregon Steamship Company, wrecked 1875 at the Long Tom bar.
- Alert, built 1865 at Oswego by Louis Paquet for the Willamette Steam Navigation Company, Remembered as “the trimmest and fastest of the P.T. fleet.”, transferred 1871 to Oregon Steamship Co., may have been later rebuilt as E.N. Cooke.
- Alice, built 1871, but not completed before P.T. Company sold to Ben Holladay. Dismantled in 1888 at Portland.
- Dayton, built 1868 at Canemah by Joseph Paquet for the P.T. Company, engines from Rival. Dismantled 1881, engines to Joseph Kellogg.
- Echo, built 1865 at Canemah by John Gates and Capt. Ankeny.
- E.D. Baker. Sternwheeler built 1862 at Vancouver, W.T. for the P.T. Company. Named after U.S. Senator from Oregon Edward D. Baker, and sometimes referred to as the Colonel Baker. This boat was worn out running in competition with O.S.N's sidewheeler New World, and as a result of that, plus a sinking near Oswego, it was dismantled with the components going into the steamer Reliance.
- Enterprise, built 1863 by George A. Pease. Dismantled at Canemah in 1875.
- Fannie Patton, built 1865 at Canemah by John T. Thomas, with engines from Onward. Named after the daughter of Edwin N Cook, Frances Mary “Fannie” Cooke (1837–1886), who married Thomas McFadden Patton in 1854. The steamer was rebuilt in 1874, and in 1880 converted to a barge.
- Henrietta, built 1869 by Orin Kellogg, worked in the Sucker Lake (as Oswego Lake was then known) trade for the Kelloggs, dismantled 1879 at Portland.
- Iris. Sidewheeler, built 1863 for the P.T. Company at The Dalles, Oregon by John D. Biles, ran against O.S.N. sidewheeler Idaho until the rate war was settled, when it was transferred to the O.S.N. Dismantled 1870 at The Dalles.
- James Clinton. First boat of the line, built 1856, first steamer, on March 12, 1857, to reach Eugene City, destroyed at Linn City, Oregon on night of April 23/24,1861, by fire on wharf that spread to the steamer.
- Kiyus, built 1863 at Celilo. This vessel, sometimes called “Cayuse” was captained by Leonard White, who believed in phonetic spelling; one of his earlier commands had been Fenix, his spelling of Phoenix. Kiyus was wrecked at Lyle, W.T., in 1866.
- Onward, built 1858 at Canemah for A. Jamieson, later came under control of O.S.N. Transferred to P.T. Company as part of 1864 settlement, dismantled 1865 at Canemah. Engines to Fannie Patton. (Not to be confused with later Onward built 1867.)
- Onward, built 1867 at Tualatin Landing, possibly the same place as Colfax, about river mile 6.0 on the Tualatin. Probably the same vessel described as being planned, in June 1867, to be built at Colfax for the Forest Grove trade.
- Reliance, built 1865 at Canemah by Allison Lambert for the P.T. Company. Remember as the “most palatial” of any steamer then on the Willamette. Dismantled 1871 at Canemah.
- Relief, built 1858 at Oregon City for Cassidy & Co. Dismantled 1865 at Canemah.
- Rival. Sternwheeler built 1860 at Portland for Pease and Dement, transferred from O.S.N. to P.T. Company as part of 1864 settlement, dismantled 1868 at Portland, engines to steamer Dayton.
- Senator, built 1864 at Milwaukie, Oregon by John T. Thomas for the P.T. Company, using engines from the steamer Surprise, destroyed by boiler explosion in 1875 while docked at Portland.
- Shoo Fly, built 1870 at Canemah by Joseph Paquet for the P.T. Company, dismantled 1878.
- Skedaddle. Sternwheel barge built 1862. by George A. Pease. A small vessel (60 feet long), used from October to November 1864, during low water, to run between Oregon City and Clackamas, Oregon. Dismantled 1869 at Portland.
- Success, built 1868 at Canemah by John T. Thomas for Capt. E.W. Baughman, of the Canemah Transportation Company, an independent line, transferred to P.T. Company by February 1869, dismantled, 1877, at Oregon City.
- Unio / Union, built 1861 at Canemah as "Unio", by John T. Apperson, later sold to James D. Miller, renamed "Union", then to Willamette Steam Navigation Company, transferred to P.T. Company ownership with merger of W.S.N. and P.T. Co., dismantled 1869, engines to Umpqua River steamer Swan.
- Yamhill. Sidewheeler. As of February 1867, this steamer made regular trips on the Tualatin River as far as Hillsboro, Oregon under Capt. Edward Kellogg, brother of Joseph Kellogg. Yamhill had a hinged smokestack to allow it to be folded down on the deck to pass under bridges along the way.

== Historical records ==
Shipping bills and cargo manifests of the People's Transportation Company are held at the archives of the University of Oregon.
