= Alice (sternwheeler) =

1872 steamboat in United States

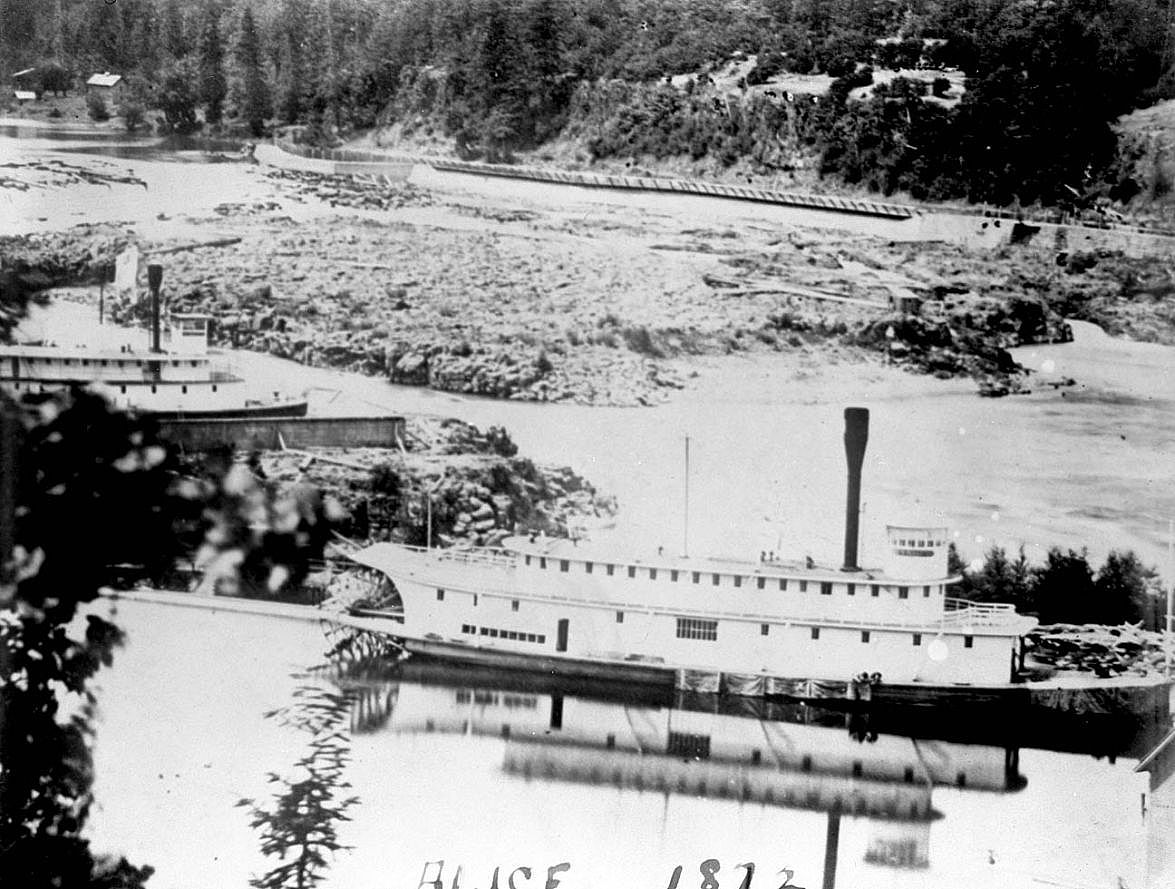
- Steamers Alice, center, and Albany at left circa 1874, at Oregon City. Across the falls can be seen the then new ship canal and locks.

History
- Name: Alice
- Owner: People's Transportation Co.; Oregon Steamship Co.; Willamette Trans. & Locks Co.; Oregon Railway & Nav. Co.
- Route: Willamette and Columbia rivers
- Completed: 1872; 154 years ago
- Identification: U.S. #105098
- Fate: Dismantled 1888

General characteristics
- Class & type: riverine all-purpose
- Tonnage: 457.16 gross tons (1874-1886); 334.22 registered tons (1886).
- Length: 150.5 ft (45.9 m) over hull (exclusive of fantail)
- Beam: 25.5 ft 9 in (8.0 m) over hull (exclusive of guards)
- Depth: 6 ft 0 in (1.83 m)
- Decks: two (main and passenger)
- Installed power: twin steam engines, horizontally mounted, each with bore of 16 in (41 cm) and stroke of 6 ft (1.83 m).
- Propulsion: stern-wheel

Alice was a stern-wheel driven steamboat that operated on the Willamette and Columbia rivers in the 1870s and 1880s. Alice was the largest vessel built above Willamette Falls and was considered in its day to be the "Queen of the River". This steamer was rebuilt after near-destruction in a fire at Oregon City, Oregon in May 1873. In 1876, it was withdrawn from the upper Willamette River and transferred to the Columbia River, where it was worked as a towboat moving ocean-going ships to and from Portland and Astoria, Oregon, near the mouth of the Columbia River.

== Construction ==
Alice was built at Canemah, Oregon in 1871 Reports that Alice was built in 1873 are incorrect. Alice was rebuilt in 1873 following a fire in early May of that year, which may provide the origin of this error.

Canemah, Oregon was a settlement established in the 1850s on the east side of the river above Willamette Falls, not far from present day Oregon City. Many steamboats were built and Canemah before the Alice, but as the town declined in the 1870s, only three were constructed there, Alice, Shoo Fly, and McMinnvillle. No steamers were built after the 1870s.

The official merchant vessel registry number for Alice was 105098. The gross tonnage (a measure of size, not weight) for the vessel was 457.16 in 1874.

In 1886, Alice's registered dimensions were 150.5 long, 25.5 beam (width) and 6-foot depth of hold; gross tonnage 457.16, registered tonnage 334.22.

When built, Alice was considered a prestige vessel, and as described as the Queen of the River. In 1889, a nostalgic steamboat captain was reported to have described Alice as follows:

... the Alice was an elegant craft, whose fantail ran back over her wheel, as if to obtain a better view of the golden spread eagle soaring on the pilot house. Tasteful window-shutters secluded games of draw poker, revenue contests, and other diversions, and kept within doors the grateful warmth of the cabin fires.

== Engines ==
The original engines in Alice had been installed first in the steamer E.D. Baker, and when that vessel was dismantled, in the sternwheeler Reliance. These were twin steam engines, horizontally mounted, each with bore of 16 in (41 cm) and stroke of 6 ft (1.8 m).

== Sale to Ben Holladay ==
On September 1, 1871, it was reported that Alice would make its trial trip the next day. However, on September 6, 1871, by vote of its shareholders, the People's Transportation Company was dissolved and all of its assets, including the not yet complete steamer Alice, were sold to a company organized by the prominent businessman Ben Holladay.

It was not until February 2, 1872, that Alice was reported to be complete and ready for service. Alice was reported to be the largest boat on the upper Willamette River, and of the same size and model as the E.N. Cooke. The cabin was described as "small, yet plenty large enough for the demands of travel." Alice was finished with staterooms instead of the older style berths. The trial trip of the new steamer, upriver from Rock Island, was reported to have been made in the last week of January 1872.

On February 9, 1872, Alice was reported to be ready to make its first commercial run up the Willamette River on the following Monday, February 12, 1872. Alice was expected to be the fastest steamer ever to run on the upper Willamette. On Tuesday, February 13, 1872, Alice reached Albany, Oregon.

On Sunday, February 9, 1873, Alice arrived at the boat basin at Oregon City with 203 tons of wheat on board, which was said to have been the largest load ever brought to the basin by a single boat. Almost a year later, on the Wednesday before January 30, 1874, Alice arrived at the boat basin with 245 tons of wheat on board.

== Rivalry with Gov. Grover ==
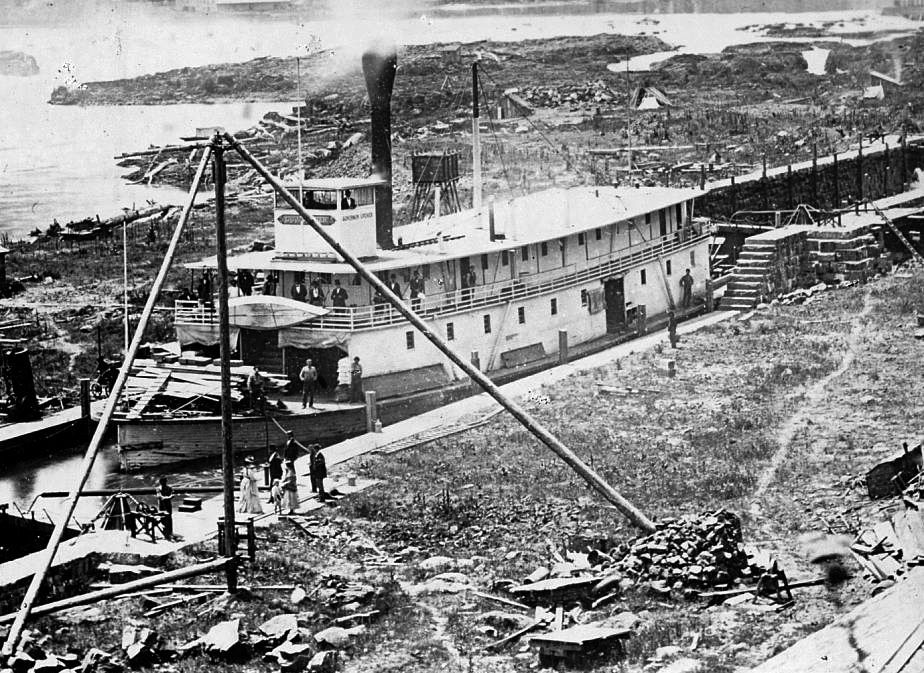
Gov. Grover, rival sternwheeler to Alice, shown in the then newly completed Willamette Locks, March 1873.

One of the rival vessels of Alice on the upper Willamette in early 1873 was the sternwheeler Gov. Grover, owned by the Willamette River Transportation Company, of which Bernard Goldsmith was president. On Thursday, March 27, 1873, there were rumors that there would be a race between the two boats. There was not an actually test of which steamer was capable of the faster speed.

The Grover left the newly completed Willamette Locks at 8:30 a.m., stopped at all the landings along the way, and arrived at Salem at 5:00 p.m. with 33 passengers. After a short stop in Salem, Grover went on to Corvallis.

Alice departed the Oregon City boat basin at 9:56 a.m. the same day, and arrived at Salem a few minutes after Grover, with 15 passengers and ten tons of through freight. Alice loaded 8 tons of freight, and departed for Corvallis about one and a half minutes after the Grover. According to a newspaper report from Salem, "they were both making the water fly when they passed out of sight."

== Near destruction by fire ==
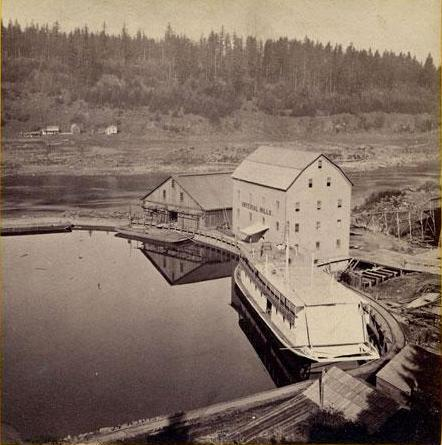
The boat basin at Oregon City in 1867. The steamers Alice and Shoo Fly were moored near here in 1873 when both vessels were nearly destroyed by fire.

On the night of Friday, May 2, 1873, the steamers Alice and Shoo Fly were heavily damaged by fire at Oregon City. The loss, estimated at $20,000, was believed by some to have been the work of an arsonist.

The steamers were both moored within a few feet of the Larocque & Co. flour mills, which the Oregon City fire department saved from destruction.

The Morning Oregonian had a somewhat different report, according to which the fire started about 10:00 p.m. on the Saturday before May 5, 1873, on board the Shoo Fly, which, shortly after a light was observed coming from the boiler area, burst into flames. Within five minutes after the fire was first noticed, it had spread to the Alice. Both boats were nearly consumed within ten minutes. The steamers had been moored next to the Imperial Mill building, and it had been in danger catching fire as well, but was saved by a shift of wind and the work of the Oregon City fire department.

Both Alice and Shoo Fly were good running condition, although Shoo Fly was said to be rather old and had perhaps a year left of its useful life at the time of the fire. The boilers and engines on both boats were undamaged, but the connecting gear, pipes and similar items were either melted or made using by having been warped by the intense heat. The hull, parts of the deck and the stern-wheel of Alice were saved, and the steamer would probably be rebuilt. The estimated loss was between $18,000 and $20,000. There was no insurance.

Some people thought the fire had originated when someone dropped cigar ash or something similar into inflammable materials on board Shoo Fly, such as pulu dust, with the fire festering slowly for some time before it was noticed, by which time it was too late. The possibility of arson was discounted, because it was thought it would not have been perpetrated at so early in the evening.

On May 9, 1873, it was reported that the Alice was to be rebuilt. By July 25, 1873, the reconstruction had begun, and the work was expected to be complete by the fall shipping season.

The steamer was still not complete on September 26, 1873, but the lower cabin frame had been placed in position, and the boat was reportedly going to be ready for the winter shipping season.

On September 9, 1873, the Oregon Steamship Company, Ben Holladay, President, and L.T. Barin, Secretary of the Board, presented two gold mounted trumpets and a certificate of the company's appreciation to the Oregon City Fire Department for its services in preventing the steamers Alice and Shoo Fly from being completely destroyed on the night of the fire.

== Returned to service ==
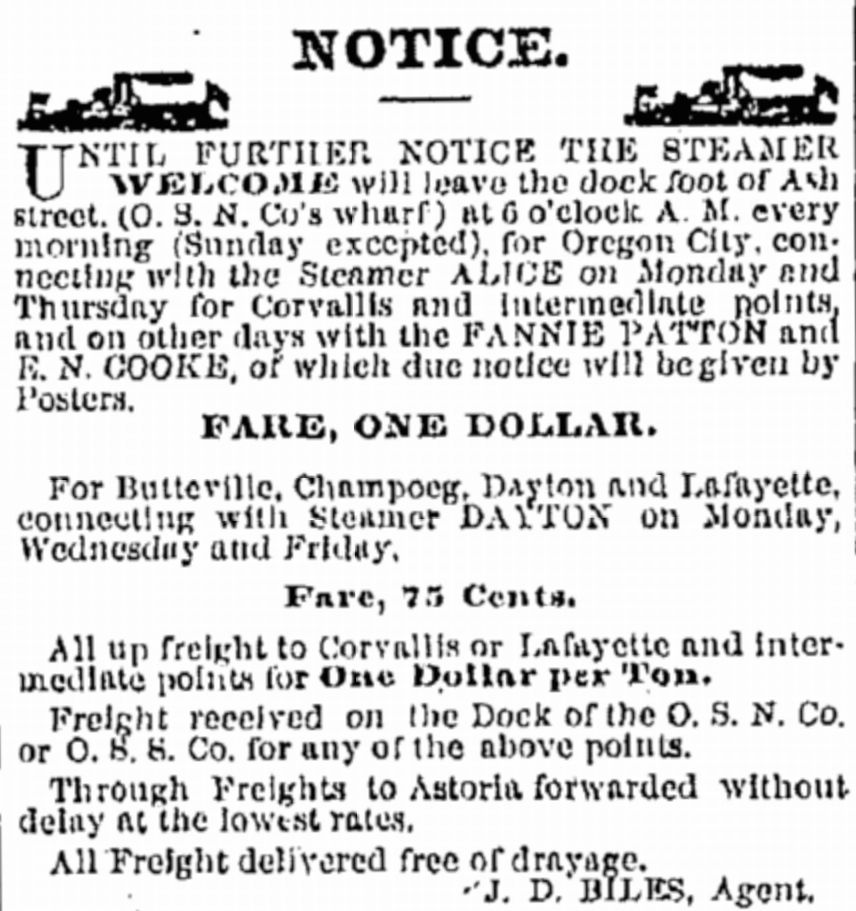
Advertisement for Willamette River steamers, including Alice, August 31, 1874.

By early November the reconstruction of both Alice and Shoo Fly was nearly complete. Alice was in the boat basin at Oregon City, and steam had been raised in the boiler on Tuesday, November 4, 1873. Shoo Fly, also nearly complete, was being rebuilt at the sawmill downriver from Oregon City.

On Saturday, November 15, 1873, Alice was taken on its trial trip following reconstruction, running from Oregon City to Boone's Ferry, on the upper Willamette. The boat ran well, but full steam was not carried, so the top speed of the vessel could not be evaluated on the trial run. Captain Milo Bell was in charge on the trial trip, and the mechanical department was headed by Reuben Smith, the company's chief engineer.

The reconstructed Alice was a significant improvement over the original steamer. The cabin structure, called the "house" was completely new. Additional space was left on the foredeck, so that there was more room for the crew to move on the deck, and also to stack additional freight.

The upper deck was divided into a smoking room, staterooms, and a cabin for ladies and another cabin for gentlemen. The upper deck had been extended over the wheel, to prevent it from splashing water onto the cabin deck. This had been the idea of Mr. Biles.

The upholstery and the painting was still being done at the time of the November trial trip, and there was still some cabin work being done.

=== Complaint from riverside property owner ===
In January 1874, an Albany, Oregon newspaper, the State Rights Democrat, published a complaint by Mr. Preston Bowman, of Spring Hill (a little down river from Independence), that he had kept tame geese, and the crew of the Alice had recently been amusing themselves by shooting the geese as the steamer passed by his place up and down the river.

=== Wheat transport ===
In February 1874, three steamers, Alice, Fannie Patton, and Albany, were all engaged in transporting wheat from Eugene City and other points downriver to Salem Flour Mills, owned by Robert Crouch Kinney (1813–1875) and company. Most of the wheat had already been sold, and was intended to be shipped to Europe. The farmers in the upper Willamette Valley were hoping to get prices of $1 a bushel for their wheat.

=== Transfer to lower Willamette River ===
On Thursday, July 23, 1874, Alice, which then belonged to the Oregon Steamship Company, was taken through the newly completed Willamette Falls Locks to the lower Willamette River. In July 1874, it was reported that Alice was to be used as a private boat of the prominent businessman Ben Holladay. According to an 1889 report, this had in fact occurred.

=== Return to upper river service ===
By August 31, 1874, Alice had been returned to the upper Willamette, running from Oregon City to Corvallis and way landings on Mondays and Thursdays, making connections at Oregon City with the steamer Welcome to Portland. Fare to Corvallis was $1.00. Freight to Corvallis and all intermediate points was $1.00 per ton, exclusive of drayage, that is, local transport charges. Alice continued to be advertised as being on this route until February 24, 1875.

=== Numerous landings on route ===
There were many landings along the Willamette river in the 1870s. In 1875, Alice made a trip from Oregon City to Albany and stopped at 33 landings along the way. This was a distance of 92 miles.

== Snagged ==
On Tuesday, February 2, 1875, Alice hit a snag near Wheatland, and sustained damage so severe that it was necessary to beach the steamer. Early reports were not able to give the extent of the damage.

Some details of the incident were reported to the States Rights Democrat, by their travelling agent, J.M. Marks, and they were that the Alice had been proceeding on the river at a good speed, when about a mile and a half downriver from Buena Vista, the steamer hit a snag, which shoved a good-sized hole into its hull just under the boiler. Buena Vista was 21 miles upriver from Salem.

The captain turned Alice around and ran it onto a bar in the river, otherwise it would have sunk, as there was already 23 inches of water in the boat just four minutes after the snagging. The passengers had to wait on board the stranded steamer for an hour until the Willamette Chief came upon the scene and took them on board. Other steamers came up on Wednesday to assist in the salvage.

Other details, some augmenting, and some conflicting with the State Rights Democrat, were reported in Salem's Willamette Farmer the next day. Captain Bell had been in command. The accident happened about one mile upriver from Buena Vista, and the snag had been newly lodged in the river. Captain Bell beached the steamer on a level bar about 200 yards from the snag strike, where the 150 tons of freight, taken on at Corvallis and Eugene, would be safe.

The afternoon of the wreck, the purser, Mr. J.W. McCully, went downriver to Salem, where he telegraphed to the company Oregon City to send up nails, lumber and carpenters to repair the Alice, and another steamer, either the Fannie Patton or the E.N. Cooke to come up and take off the cargo.

Alice was brought down to the company's boat basin on Monday February 8, 1875, where the damage turned out to be worse than it was first thought to have been. Alice was back in operation by February 26, 1875, when than morning it picked up 5,500 feet of maple lumber from Capital Mills, at Salem, part of a 40,000-foot lot being sawn for the Oregon Furniture Co. of Portland.

== New engines ==
In July 1875 two new engines were scheduled to be cast for Alice at the Willamette Iron Works, with each engine having a cylinder bore of 17 inches and a piston stroke of six feet. These engines, which were larger than the boat's original ones, were installed during the low water period in the fall of 1875, and the steamer was ready to resume operations in November of that year.

== 1876 schedule on upper river ==
In January 1876, the Oregon Steamship Company. W.H. McCully, agent, had placed Alice on a schedule of running from Salem to Corvallis and way landings on Mondays and Thursdays of each week. On the return from Corvallis, Alice departed for Portland in the mornings. Alice alternated on this schedule with the O.S.S. Co. steamer Bonanza, which ran for Corvallis on Tuesdays and Fridays. O.S.S. Co. advertised this schedule until April 1876.

== 1876 transfer to lower river ==
On May 6, 1876, the Salem Statesman reported that "'a number of citizens on the Upper Willamette, upon learning that the steamer Alice is to be laid up, declare that if Capt. Bell and Doc McCully are not furnished with a boat, they, the people will build one for them."

== Sale to Oregon Steam Navigation Company ==
In late May 1876, Alice, together with all the other steamers and property of the Oregon Steamship Company, was sold to the Willamette Transportation and Locks Company, a subsidiary of the Oregon Steam Navigation Company. With this purchase, the Oregon Steam Navigation Company now controlled all the steamboats on both the Columbia and the Willamette Rivers, except for two, City of Salem and Ohio. In August 1876, Alice, under the control of the Willamette River Transportation and Locks Company, was brought downriver to Portland, to take the place of the Gov. Grover, which was going to the boneyard for repairs.

== Towing work ==
In October 1876 Alice was engaged in towing vessels up and down the Columbia River, under Capt. Billy Smith. Among numerous reported tows: on the afternoon of September 12, 1877, Alice brought the ship Greta, a British vessel, alongside the wharf of the Wallamet River Canal and Locks Company, in Astoria, Oregon, where the Greta would load additional cargo before departing for Europe. On Sunday, January 9, 1881, the steamer Alice, with Captain Strang piloting towed the Orient to Knappton, W.T.

== Accidents ==
On Saturday afternoon, December 15, 1877, George W. Weldon, a Portland hotel runner, was drowned at Swan Island; while trying to board the steamer Alice from a skiff, the skiff overturned and Weldon was thrown into the river.

== Disposition ==
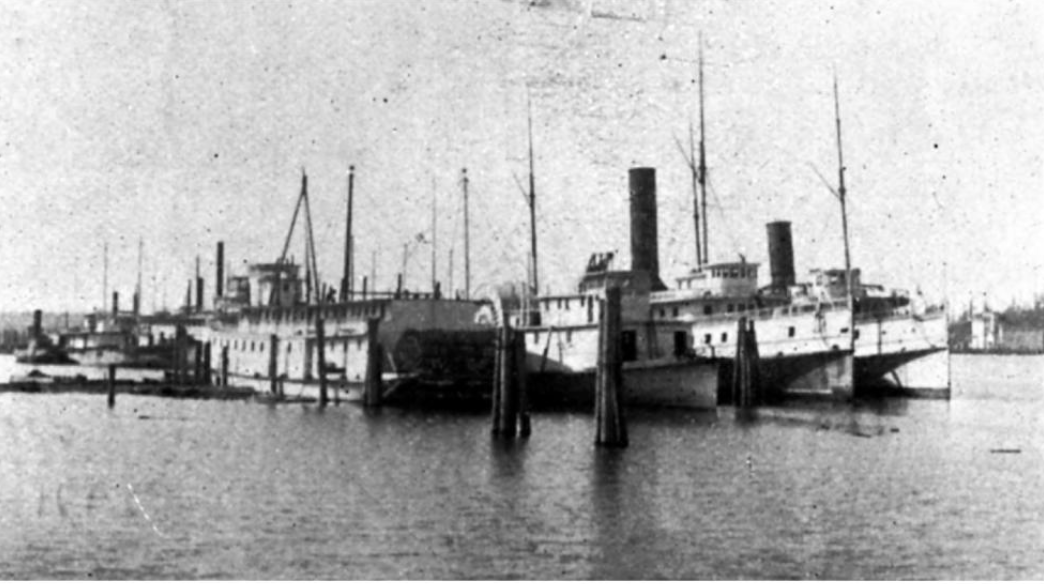
OSN steamboat boneyard, Portland, Oregon, in 1892.

By early June 1889, Alice had been at the boneyard for about three years, when the boat sank, with the water coming up a little over its decks. The "boneyard" was the name for a place alongside the Willamette River which had been established by the Oregon Steam Navigation Company for the storage and dismantling of steamers that were no longer in service. Steamboats were also built, repaired, and reconstructed at the boneyard.

Alice had been used to pump water out of barges and other hulls at the boneyard. The machinery was reported to be "still good and in fair order." Alice was scheduled to be raised on June 5, 1889, and possibly a new hull would be built under the boat.
