= Joseph Kellogg =

American businessman

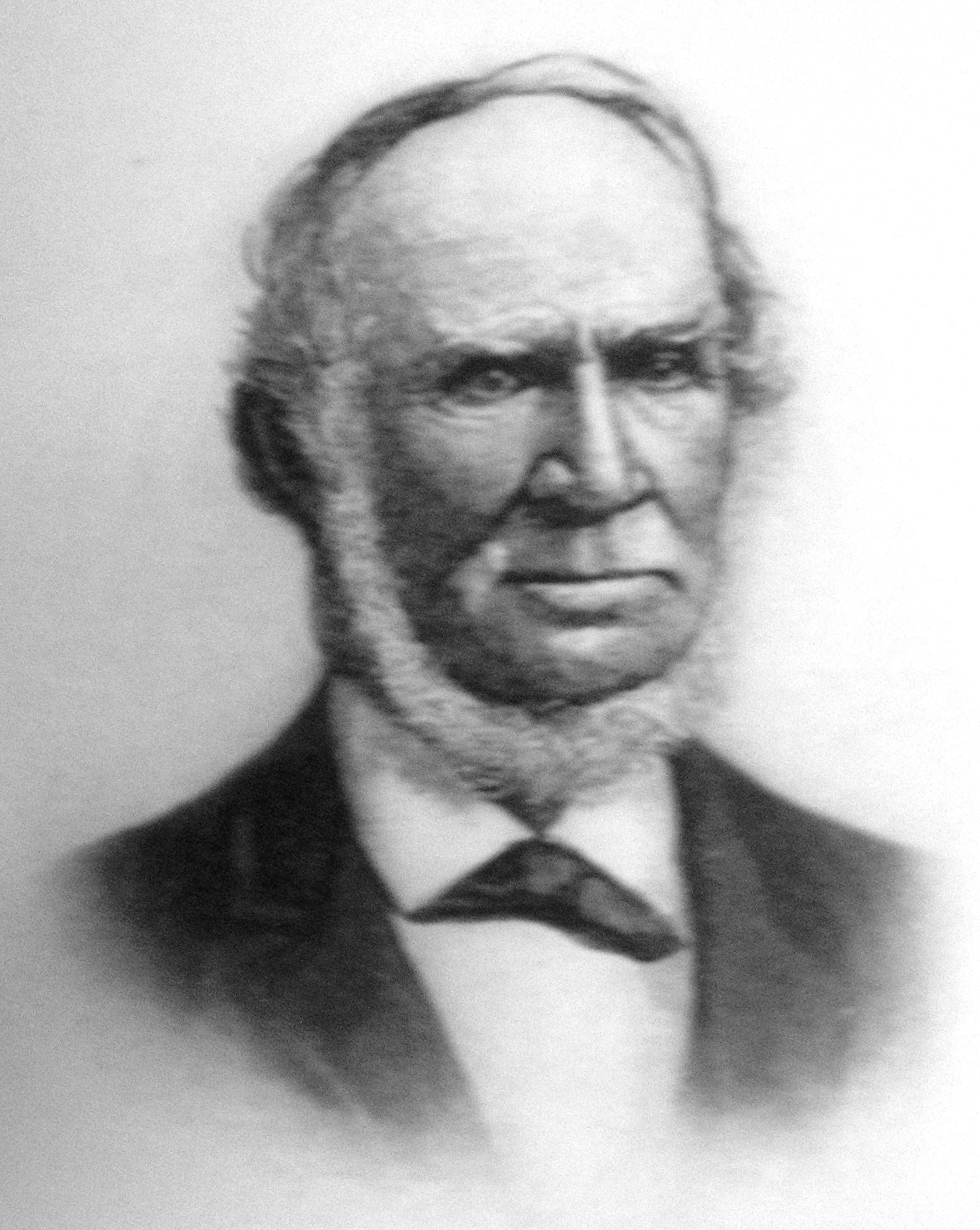
Joseph Kellogg

Joseph Kellogg was a well-known steamboat captain and businessman of Portland, Oregon.

== Early life ==
Joseph Kellogg was born in Canada on June 12, 1812. His father Orrin Kellogg (September 4, 1790 – February 14, 1872) was born in St. Albans, Vermont, and his mother Margaret Miller Kellogg was Canadian. After the War of 1812, his family moved first to New York and then to Ohio. Kellogg was trained as a millwright.

In 1847 the Kellogg family crossed the plains to Oregon. They left Wood county, Ohio, November 24, 1847, with horse-drawn wagons. At Cincinnati, Ohio they shipped by steamer to St. Louis, and from there drove to St. Joseph, Missouri where they wintered.

== Emigration to Oregon ==
In May a company of thirty wagons started on journey across the plains. They had covered wagons and were provided with tin stoves and all the arms and provisions needed for such a journey. The emigrant party later exchanged their horses for oxen. They were able to travel nearly twenty-five miles a day, and arrived at Milwaukie, Oregon on September 8, 1848.

On arrival in Oregon, the heads of the families took up adjoining donation land claims of 640 acres (2.6 km^{2}) each, on which they erected cabins. Kellogg built the first commercial flour mill in Oregon. He also built several of the first sawmills. Kellogg's land claim was next to that of Lot Whitcomb, at Milwaukie. Kellogg, Whitcomb and William Torrence laid out the town site of what they hoped would be the principal city in Oregon.

In Milwaukie, Kellogg built a sawmill and a schooner. Kellogg, Whitcomb and Torrence loaded the schooner with provisions from the adjoining farms, took it to California, and there sold both vessel and cargo, and with the proceeds they bought the brig Forest, which they used in the lumber trade between Oregon and California. Lumber in Sacramento was at that time worth $200 for 1,000 board feet. The firm soon made money enough to purchase the bark Louisiana, which was fitted with engines and boilers and the complete outfit of a steamship.

== Construction of the Lot Whitcomb ==
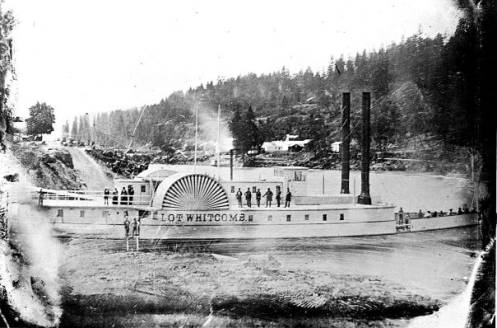
Lot Whitcomb, first steamboat built by Joseph Kellogg

In the spring of 1850, Kellogg, Whitcomb and Torrence began building the sidewheel steamer Lot Whitcomb, which was either the first or the second large steam craft ever built in Oregon. They launched this boat on December 25, 1850. Kellogg was one of the owners of the boat, as well as of the site of the new city of Milwaukie. Under the initial command of Capt. John C. Ainsworth, Lot Whitcomb ran between Milwaukie and Astoria for several years, after which they sold it in San Francisco. Later Kellogg withdrew from the firm, forming a partnership with Bradbury and Eddy, who together built the Standard Flour Mills, which for years were the most extensive in the state of Oregon.

== Association with the People's Transportation Company ==
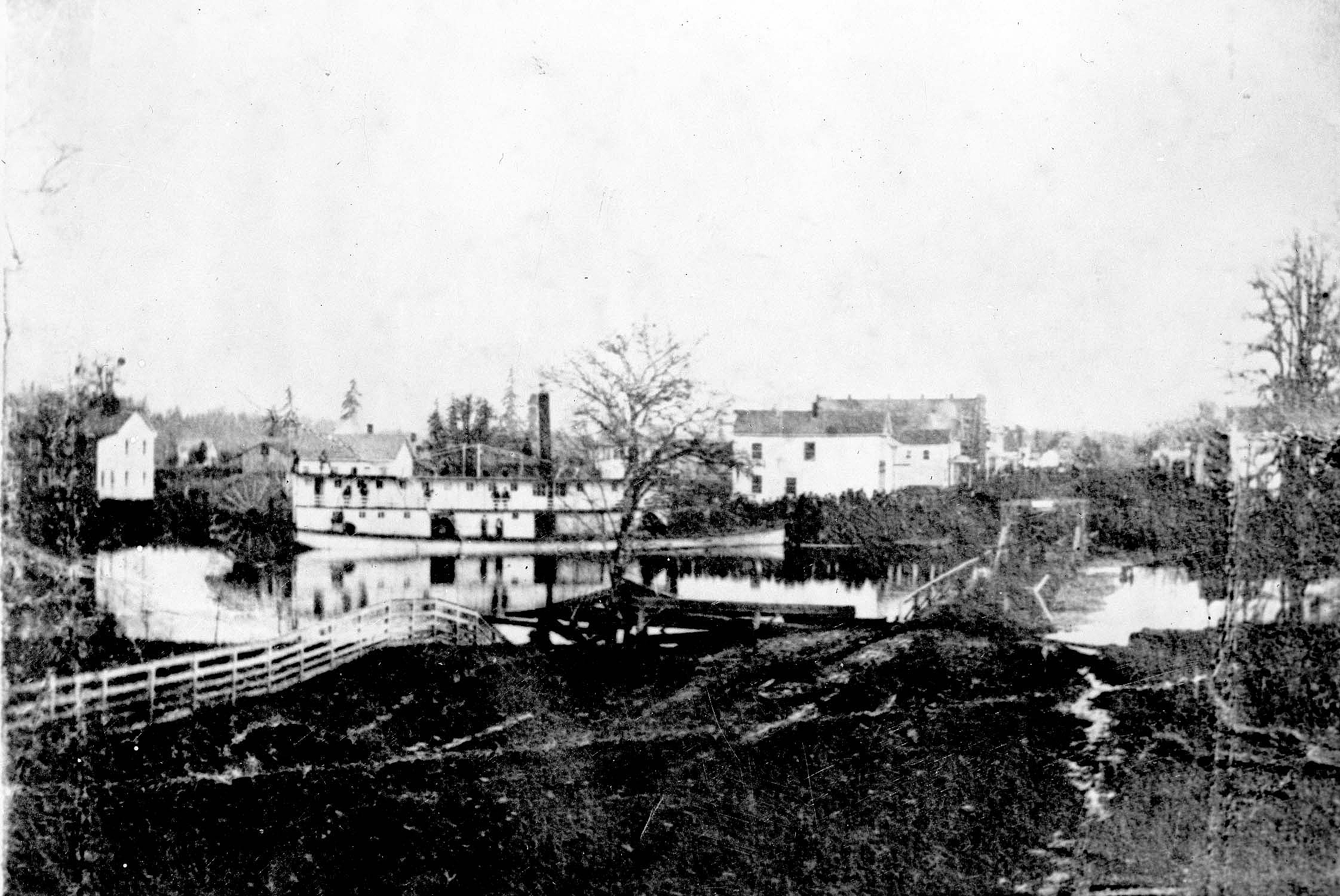
Onward, steamboat built by Joseph Kellogg, at Salem during flood of 1861

In 1863 Kellogg built the sternwheeler Senator, which he sold to the People's Transportation Company. Kellogg became an owner of the People's Transportation Company in 1864. In 1867, Kellogg superintended the building of a basin above Willamette Falls, in 1867, which made it much easier to traverse the portage between the portions of the Willamette River above and below Willamette Falls. Kellogg was also connected with Capt. George A. Pease in the first navigation of the Tualatin River with the steamboat Onward, and they also constructed the canal between that river and Sucker Lake, making it possible to bring freight from the Tualatin River to Oswego and thence to the Willamette river. Kellogg also laid out the town of Oswego.

== Sale of business to Ben Holladay ==
In 1870 the People's Transportation Company sold out to Ben Holladay, and soon afterward the Willamette Transportation Company was formed, of which Kellogg became vice-president and director. Under Kellogg's supervision, this company built the steamboats Governor Grover and Beaver.

== Operations on the Cowlitz River ==
Soon later Kellogg sold out his interest in the Willamette Transportation Company and its boats, and formed a new transportation company with his brother, Jason, and his two sons. Kellogg then built the steamboats Joseph Kellogg and Toledo and placed his boats on the Columbia River, on the line to Washougal, Washington and the Cowlitz River. His two sons, Captains Orrin and Charles H., were put in command of these boats. The firm was incorporated as the Joseph Kellogg Transportation Company, and it became one of the most successful steamboat lines on the Columbia river.

== Personal life ==
Kellogg's son Charles H. Kellogg became a successful steamboat captain, but died before his father on August 7, 1889. Kellogg's other son Orrin lived much longer, and was also a successful captain. Kellogg died November 30, 1903, and is buried at the Greenwood Hills Cemetery, Portland, Oregon along with his wife Estella. Kellogg had a child, Harvey, who died in infancy. Kellogg lived to the age of 91, and at his death was the senior river pilot. Kellogg was also a prominent Mason.

== See also ==
- Steamboats of the Columbia River
- Steamboats of the Willamette River
- Steamboats of the Cowlitz River
- History of Portland, Oregon
