= Enterprise (1863 sternwheeler) =

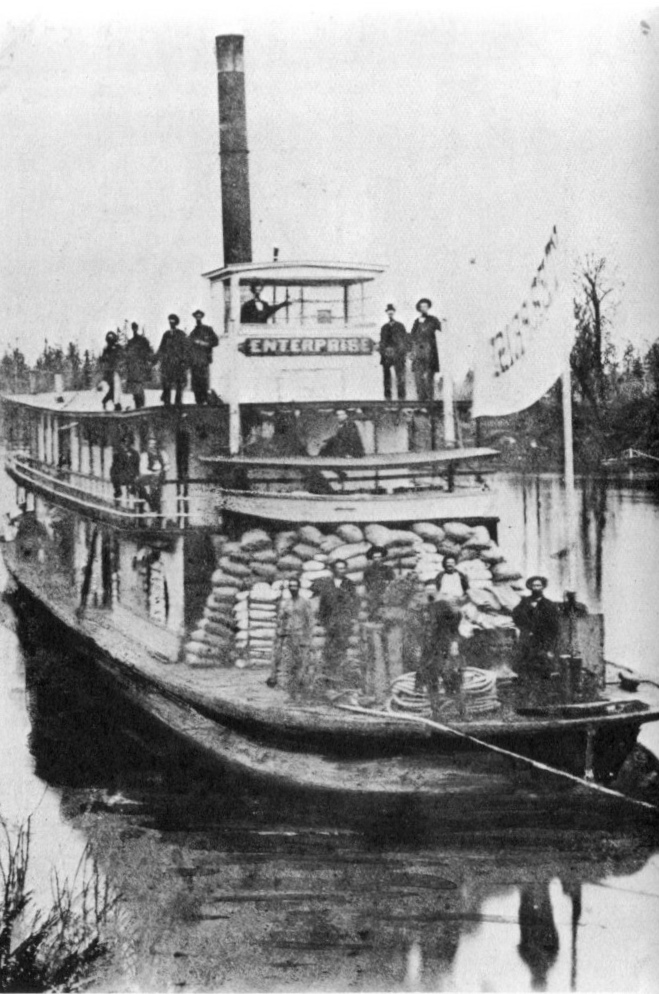

History
- Name: Enterprise
- Owner: People's Transportation Company
- Route: Willamette River
- Builder: George A. Pease
- In service: 1863
- Out of service: 1875
- Identification: US# 8141
- Fate: Dismantled

General characteristics
- Type: inland steamsboat
- Length: 120 ft (36.6 m) or 125 ft (38.1 m), exclusive of fantail
- Beam: 24 ft (7.3 m) or 26 ft (7.9 m)
- Depth: 4 ft (1 m) depth of hold
- Installed power: twin steam engines, single-cylinder, horizontally mounted, each with bore of 13 in (330.2 mm) and stroke of 4 ft (1.22 m), 13 nominal horsepower.
- Propulsion: stern-wheel

Enterprise was a sternwheel steamboat that operated on the Willamette River from 1863 to 1875. This vessel should not be confused with several other steamers named Enterprise which operated in the Pacific Northwest at about the some time.

== Construction ==
In 1863, a new independent steamer, the Enterprise, was built at Canemah, Oregon by Capt. George A. Pease, backed by a company formed by Capt. Charles. W. Pope (1831–1871), Capt. Nat H. Lane Sr. (1823–1878), C. Friendly, Judge Riley E. Stratton, C. Crawford, James Wilson, C.W. Rea, and S. Ellsworth. Enterprise, the second steamer of this name to operate on the Willamette, was launched in November 1863, and ran independently for a short time under George Pease.

== Dimensions ==
Enterprise was 120 or 125 feet long, exclusive of the extension of the main deck over the stern, called the fantail, on which the stern-wheel was mounted. The beam (width) was 24 feet, and the depth of hold was four feet. Gross tonnage was 194.

The official merchant vessel registry number was 8141.

== Engineering ==
Enterprise was equipped with twin steam engines, single-cylinder, horizontally mounted, each with bore of 13 in (330.2 mm) and stroke of 4 ft (1.22 m), 13 nominal horsepower.

== Operations ==
Soon after Enterprise was launched, an accommodation was reached with the dominant steamer line on the Willamette, the People's Transportation Company, after which Pease remained in command for over two years. In 1866, the P.T. Company purchased Enterprise outright from its original owners.

As of October 27, 1866, steamers of the People's Transportation Company, Enterprise, Echo, and Active departed Oregon City every Monday and Thursday for Salem, Albany, and Corvallis.

In March 1867, recent high water in the river had changed the channels leading to Eugene, and created a shallow bar about six miles south of Eugene, so that Enterprise, running under Capt. Sebastian Miller, was unable to reach either Eugene or Lancaster.

In September 1867, the steamers Enterprise and Echo were reported to be able to make regular trips to Albany because navigation obstacles in the river had been removed.

As of November 16, 1867, Enterprise was running on a winter schedule, from Oregon City to Harrisburg and Eugene every Wednesday.

On December 21, 1867, it was reported that Enterprise had run aground a few miles downriver from Eugene, and that as a result of the water's having receded with the boat still aground, it was doubted that the steamer could be refloated until the water would rise again. However, the vessel was freed, and returned to Oregon City on Friday, December 27, 1867, with no apparent damage.

In late January, 1868, ice coated the Willamette River. Enterprise came downriver on January 25, 1868, and had to break a channel in the ice from Rock Island to the boat basin at Oregon City.

== Financial success ==
Enterprise was highly successful financially, earning a 33.3% profit in its first year of operations, and 66.6% in the second year, with a dividend of $50 a share, When Enterprise was purchased by P.T. Co., the original owners received $280 in P.T. stock for every $100 of Enterprise stock.

== Disposition ==
Enterprise was dismantled in 1875 at Canemah.
