= Riley E. Stratton =

American judge

11th Justice of the Oregon Supreme Court
- In office 1859–1866
- Preceded by: New position
- Succeeded by: Alonzo A. Skinner

Personal details
- Born: 1823 Pennsylvania, U.S.
- Died: December 26, 1866 (aged 42–43) Eugene, Oregon, U.S.

Riley Evans Stratton (1823 – December 26, 1866) was an American attorney and judge in Oregon. He served as the 11th justice of the Oregon Supreme Court, serving from 1859 until 1866. He was one of the first group of justices elected to the court, along with Aaron E. Wait and Paine Page Prim; previous members of the court were appointed during Oregon's territorial period.

== Early life ==
Stratton was born in 1823 to C.P. Stratton in Pennsylvania. As a child his parents moved the family to Madison, Indiana. Stratton graduated from College Hill in the state of Ohio. He then prepared to serve in the ministry, but then switched to studying law and was admitted to the Indiana bar. After college he returned to Madison and engaged in the practice of law.

== Oregon ==
Stratton moved to what was then the Oregon Territory in 1852, traveling around Cape Horn and settling in Scottsburg. There he practiced law and was involved in various business enterprises, and served as a district attorney. In 1858, when the new state government was being formed, Stratton was elected to the Oregon Supreme Court and began his term in 1859. During that time, the Supreme Court justices also rode circuit, continuing this practice until 1878. Stratton won re-election to a second term on the bench in 1864, but died in office on December 26, 1866, at his home in Eugene, Oregon.

== Entry into the steamboat business ==
In 1863, Stratton became part-owner of a steamboat, the Enterprise, which was built by Capt. George A. Pease at Canemah, Oregon.
