= Senator (sternwheeler) =

Steamboat used in Oregon, United States

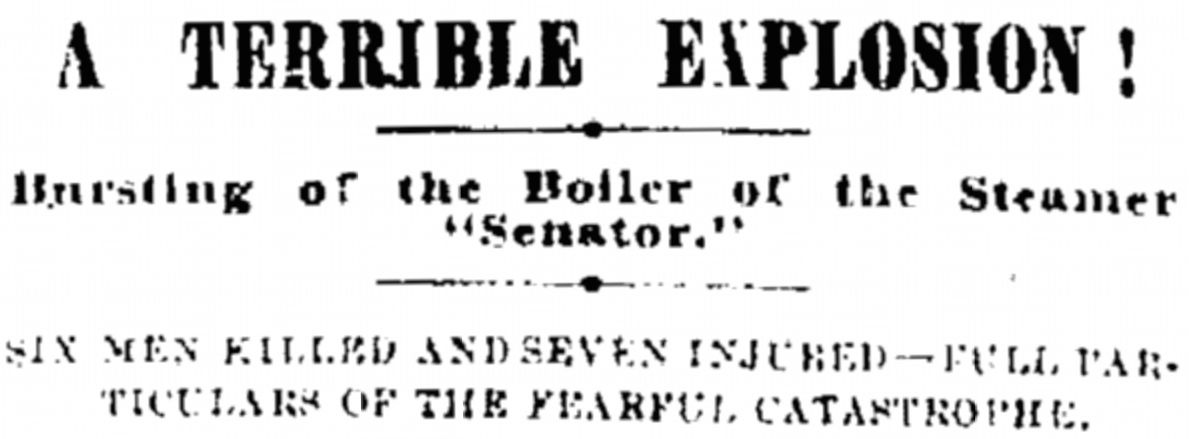
- News item, May 7, 1875

History
- Name: Senator
- Owner: People's Transportation Co.; Oregon Steamship Co.
- Route: Willamette River
- In service: 1863
- Out of service: 1875
- Identification: U.S. 23148
- Fate: Destroyed by boiler explosion

General characteristics
- Type: inland steamship
- Length: 123 ft (37.5 m) exclusive of fantail.
- Beam: 21 ft (6.4 m) exclusive of guards
- Depth: 5 ft (1.5 m) 3.5 ft (1.1 m) or depth of hold
- Installed power: twin high-pressure steam engines, horizontally mounted, single cylinder, bore 12.25 in (0.31 m), stroke 48 in (1.22 m).
- Propulsion: stern-wheel

Senator was a stern-wheel-driven steamboat which operated on the Willamette River in the state of Oregon from 1863 to 1875. Senator is chiefly remembered for its having been destroyed in a fatal boiler explosion in 1875 while making a landing at the Portland, Oregon waterfront in 1875.

== Construction ==
Senator was built in 1863 at Milwaukie, Oregon by shipbuilder John T. Thomas (1808–1890) for steamboat captain Joseph Kellogg. The steamer made its trial trip on January 22, 1864. The dimensions of the hull were length 123 feet; beam (width) 21 feet; depth of hold 5.0 feet; draft light (unloaded) 22 inches. Gross tonnage in 1874 for Senator was 297.99.

The official merchant vessel registry number for Senator was 23148.

== Engineering ==
The machinery for Senator came from the steamer Surprise, which had been built at Canemah, Oregon in 1857. The boat was powered by two single cylinder steam engines, each with a bore diameter of 12.25 inches and a stroke of 48 inches. The stern-wheel was 17 feet in diameter with planks, called “paddles” 14 inches across.

== Ownership ==
Soon after Senator was completed, Joseph Kellogg, the owner, sold it to People's Transportation Company in exchange for stock in the company.

== Operations ==
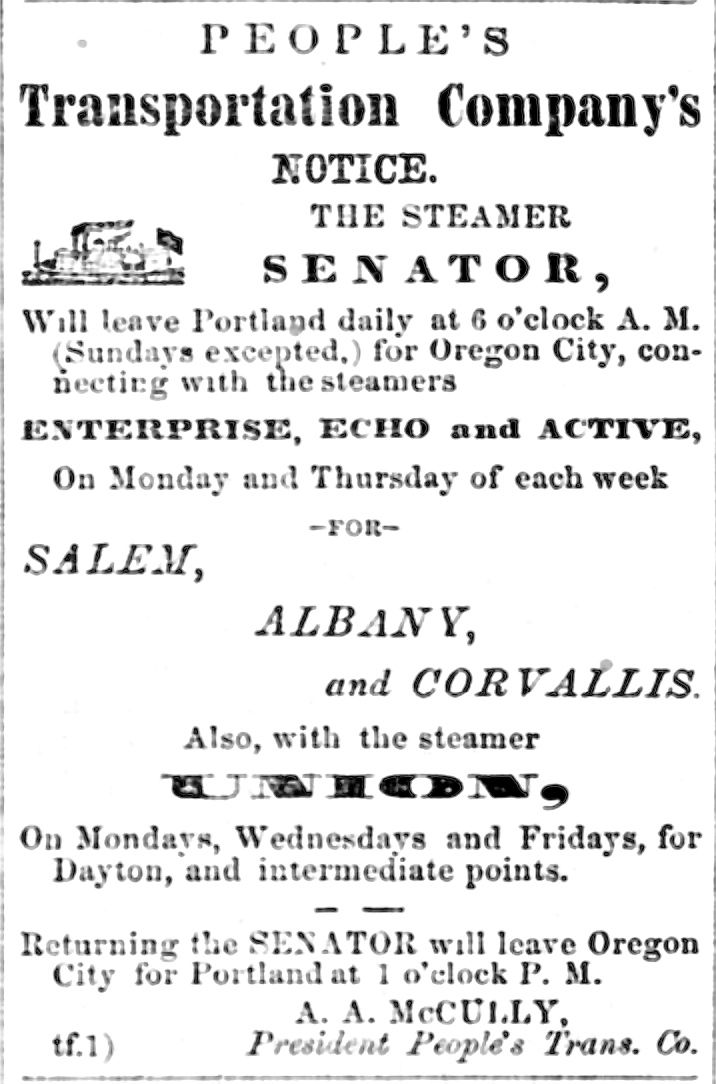
Advertisement for Senator and other steams, November 3, 1866.

Joseph Kellogg continued in command of Senator until 1867, when George A. Pease and E.W. Baughman became captains. Capt. Charles H. Kellogg (1846–1889) took command until the steamer was sold to Ben Hollday in 1871.

=== Connection with Sucker Lake - Tualatin river route ===
In October 1866, Senator was part of a transportation route to Washington County, Oregon which sought to avoid the navigation barrier then formed by Willamette Falls.

Senator would run to Oswego, on the Willamette River, where passengers would disembark, and cross over to Sucker Lake, as Oswego Lake was then known. The traveler would then stay overnight at Shade's Hotel in Oswego, and, the next morning, board a small sternwheeler, the Minnehaha.

The lake boat then paddled across the water to the lake's western end, where it was reported, they would be taken to Colfax, on the Tualatin River “by cars”. Once at Colfax, the steamer Yamhill, with Captain Kellogg in charge, would “be in readiness.” The Yamhill would then steam up the Tualatin River, with, it was projected, excursionists, as far as Taylor's Bridge.

=== Portland - Oregon City route ===
As of October 27, 1866, Senator, running for the People's Transportation Company, departed Portland daily (except Sunday) at 6:00 a.m. for Oregon City, where connections were made with Enterprise, Echo, and Active, running every Monday and Thursday for Salem, Albany and Corvallis. Connections were also made at Oregon City with the Union, which ran on Mondays, Wednesdays and Fridays for Dayton and intermediate points. Returning to Portland, Senator departed Oregon City daily at 1:00 p.m. Captain E.W. Baughman was in charge of Senator at this time.

In November 1867, Senator was under the command of Captain Thomas Berry.

=== 1870 overhaul ===
In July 1870, Senator was hauled out of the river at the lower end of Oregon City to undergo a major overhaul, including an increase in engine power, and apparently to have a new hull constructed under the vessel.

On October 21, 1870, it was reported that Senator should be receiving its machinery, and was expected to be returned to service on the route between Oregon City and Portland in the next week or two.

=== Return to service ===
In June 1871, Charles W. Pope was purser of the Senator.

As of November 1871, Senator was being operated by the Willamette Transportation Company, departing Portland at 2:00 p.m. daily for Oregon City, and departing Oregon City the following morning at 7:30 a.m. on the return trip to Portland.

On Wednesday, October 16, 1872, Senator transported several hundred barrels of cement to Oregon City to be used in the construction of the Willamette Falls Locks.

=== Sunk in Clackamas Rapids ===
On the morning of November 30, 1871, while on the way downriver from Oregon City to Portland, with a heavy load of cargo (203 tons), Senator became unmanageable in the swift currents of the Clackamas Rapids. As a result, the steamer sank in about seven feet of water. The cargo was taken off by another steamer E.N. Cooke.

Damage to the steamer was initially thought to be considerable but still “easily repaired.” Damage to the cargo could not be ascertained as of the first report of the incident. Reportedly no blame for the accident could rest upon the officers of the boat.

According to another report, Senator was thrown by an eddy against the rocks at Rynearson's Point, but sank not in seven feet of water but only two or three feet, but enough to cover the steamer's lower deck. The steamer was proceeding through the eastern chute of the rapids, considered the safer route at a good stage of water, some of which was considerably.

The cargo was reported to be 140 tons, mostly of flour. While the project of raising and repairing the Senator was underway, the E.N. Cooke would take its place on the route.

== Destruction at Portland waterfront ==
=== Boiler explodes ===
At 2:45 p.m. on May 6, 1875, the boiler on Senator exploded. The steamer had just left its mooring at the dock of the Oregon Steamship Company and steamed past the city front, to the foot of Alder Street, where its speed slackened in preparation for coming alongside the steamer Vancouver, moored at the Willamette River Transportation Company wharf, where Vancouver was to transfer cargo to Senator. The stern-wheel of the Senator had just ceased to revolve when the explosion occurred.

The entire cabin from the pilot house to the hog post was destroyed, with the pilot house lifted 75 feet in the air and falling in the river a considerable distance away. Other wreckage was scattered across the river, and several people were struggling in the water, trying to cling on to floating fragments. The detonation was reported to have shaken the foundation of every building in Portland. Within two minutes of the explosion three or four thousand people were hurrying towards the scene.

The Senator did not immediately sink as a result of the explosion, probably because of several water-tight compartments, but instead drifted downstream and beached opposite the Oregon Steamship Company dock, after which the stern sank until the stern-wheel was under water, but the bow remained above the surface.

=== Rescue efforts ===
The steamer Vancouver, with an experienced steamboat man in charge, Capt. William H. Troup (1828–1882) was immediately unmoored and went to the aid of the Senator. There were about 20 passengers on board Senator, most of whom had fortunately been at the rear part of the cabin, more distant from the boiler, and were relatively unhurt. People alongside the river launched small boats to rescue the people in the water. After all the people had been rescued, the men in the boats started picking up the floating articles of freight.

=== Casualties ===
It was not easily to determine how many people were killed or missing as a result of the explosion. Known casualties were Captain Daniel McGill, of Oregon City, killed in the pilot house, purser Joseph D. Losey, also of Oregon City, fireman George Warner, and deckhands James Smith, John Cosgrove and John Crowley. The bodies of these men were not immediately recovered. A number of other people were injured, and there were some fortunate escapes.

=== Cause of the disaster ===
The boiler, although built in 1857, had been inspected on October 18, 1874, and found to be in good condition and was “regarded as very strong and perfectly safe.” It was permitted to carry 100 pounds of steam. The cause of the explosion was thought to be a pump failure resulting in the injection of cold water onto red hot heating surfaces in the boiler, creating so much steam that the boiler could not contain it, producing the explosion. The boiler itself was blown to pieces.

=== Charges against the engineer ===
On May 11, 1875, the engineer, John V. Smith, who had been on board at the time of the explosion, was arrested and charged with manslaughter, the allegations being that through want of experience, incompetency, or criminal negligence the explosion occurred. Smith was acquitted of the charge, but the explosion always weighed heavily on his mind, and he was seldom in charge of steamers afterwards.
