= Guards (steamboat) =

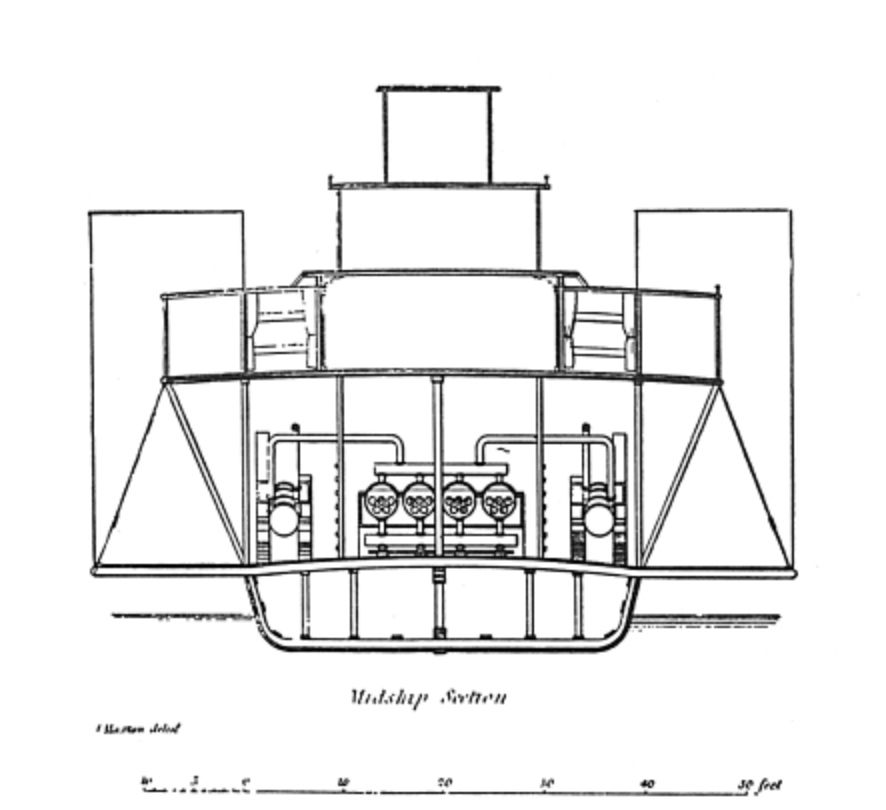
Diagram showing position of guards, engines, hull, cabins and main deck on a steamboat of the 1860s.

Guards on a steamboat were extensions of the main deck out from the boat’s main hull. Guards were originally adopted for side-wheel steamboats to protect the paddle wheels and to provide a mounting point for the outer ends of the paddle wheel shafts. The main deck planking extended out over the guards, and when a steamboat was fully loaded, and sunk deeply in the water, it often appeared that the edges of the guards marked the line of the hull.

The size of the guards was governed, on a sidewheeler, by the width of the paddle-wheels and their housings. On early steamboats operating on the Mississippi and Ohio rivers the overall width of the vessel, counting the guards, did not exceed more than about one-third of the hull width. However, by the 1850s, the width of the guards in extreme cases was more than twice the width of the hull.

For example, the hull of the Jacob Strader, a large vessel (905 tons) built in 1853 for the Cincinnati and Louisville Mail Line, was 27.5 feet wide, but measured over the guards the main deck was 69 feet across. While the Strader was an extreme case, it was common for guards to make the main deck 50 to 75 per cent wider than the hull.

Guards were also used on sternwheelers, where, with the paddle wheel being mounted at the stern, they had no structural function on the vessel. On sternwheelers the guards gave additional room to store freight and fuel, allowed a passage between different parts of the boat, and provided a place for passengers to promenade.

One problem with guards was that they could make the steamboat less stable, and with the type of boilers used on the Ohio-Mississippi boats, even a list of ten or twelve inches to one side could cause the boilers to malfunction, which, if prolonged, could result in an explosion. This was difficult to manage, especially when for example passengers would crowd along one side of a boat to observe an attraction.
