= Chester (sternwheeler) =

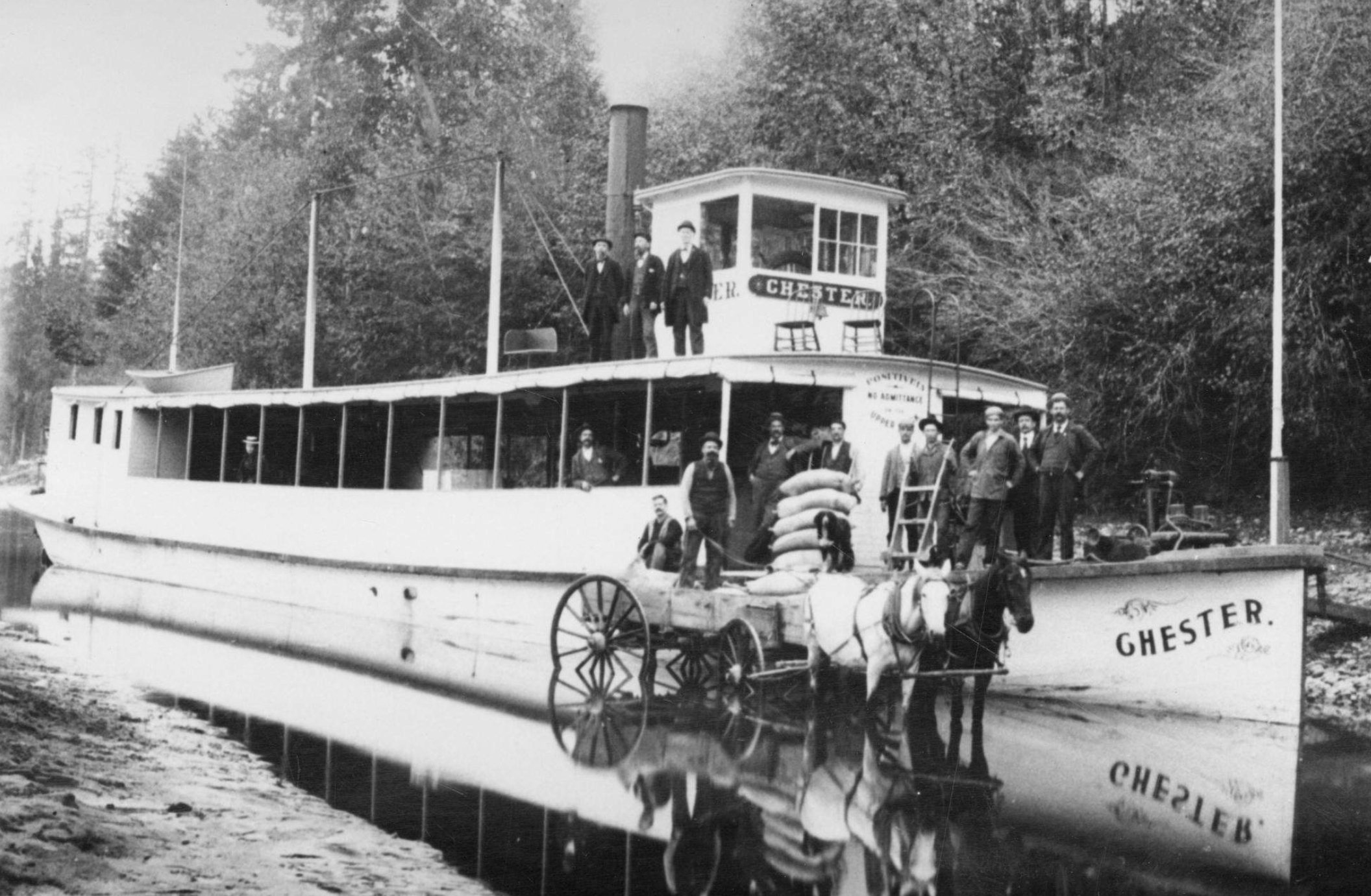
- Chester in the Cowlitz River, 1897

History
- Name: Chester
- Owner: Joseph Kellogg
- Route: Cowlitz River
- In service: 1897
- Out of service: 1917
- Identification: U.S. #127201
- Fate: Abandoned at Kelso, Washington

General characteristics
- Type: inland all-purpose
- Length: 101 ft (30.78 m)
- Beam: 20.9 ft (6.37 m)
- Draft: 5.5 in (140 mm)(1897) 7.5 in (190 mm) (1901)
- Depth: 3.8 ft (1.16 m) depth of hold
- Installed power: twin steam engines, horizontally mounted, cylinder bore 6.0 in (150 mm) and stroke of 2.0 ft (61 cm).
- Propulsion: stern-wheel
- Speed: 30 miles per hour maximum under highly favorable conditions

Chester was a shallow draft steamboat built in 1897 that ran until 1917, mostly on the Cowlitz River in southwestern Washington.

Chester was built to an unorthodox design. When Chester was built it was widely predicted that the boat would be a failure. Instead Chester was a success, and was said to have paid for itself many times over.

Although one of the smallest steamers to operate on the Columbia river system, Chester had an important role to play in connection with the Cowlitz river basin, because it made a connection at Kelso, Washington with larger steamers running to Portland, Oregon.

== Name ==
Chester was named after Chester O. Kellogg, a grandson of Capt. Joseph Kellogg, and son of Capt. Orrin Kellogg.

In March 1906 Chester Kellogg became the Portland dock agent for the Kellogg Transportation Company as a replacement for H. Yount.

== Construction ==
Chester was built in Portland, Oregon by Joseph Supple for Joseph Kellogg. Chester was constructed to draw as little water as possible to be able to operate on the Cowlitz River in southwestern Washington.

=== Design ===
Chester was designed to have the greatest bearing service on the water to keep its draft as little as possible. The weight of the materials used to build the boat was kept as low as possible. On Chester the planks were cut from red cedar. This had the additional advantage of reducing the power needed to drive the vessel. Chester was the first of these types of steamers to be launched.

The hull of Chester was flexible, being kept in its proper shape by system of hog posts and hog chains. This combination of posts and chains held up the boiler, stern and foredeck, and held down the points where the hog posts were stepped. The hull was designed to bend without breaking any of the joints or causing the caulking to break out from between the planks.

It was possible for Chester, when passing upstream over a sandbar where there was less water than the boat's draft, to flex over the bar, so that the forward part of the boat would rise on to the bar, while the spinning of the sternwheel excavated the bar sufficiently to allow the boat to pass.

As built, Chester had no fixed sides to its lower structure area (called a "house"), only tarpaulin covers. Later, apparently by 1907, sides had been added to the lower house and an upper cabin had been added. This increased the vessel's draft.

=== Machinery ===
Chester was driven by a stern-wheel turned by twin steam engines, horizontally mounted, cylinder bore 6.0 in (150 mm) and stroke of 2.0 ft (61 cm). Alternatively, the engines have been reported to have had a bore of 8.0 in (200 mm) and stroke of 3.0 ft (91 cm). The boiler was a locomotive firebox type.

=== Dimensions ===
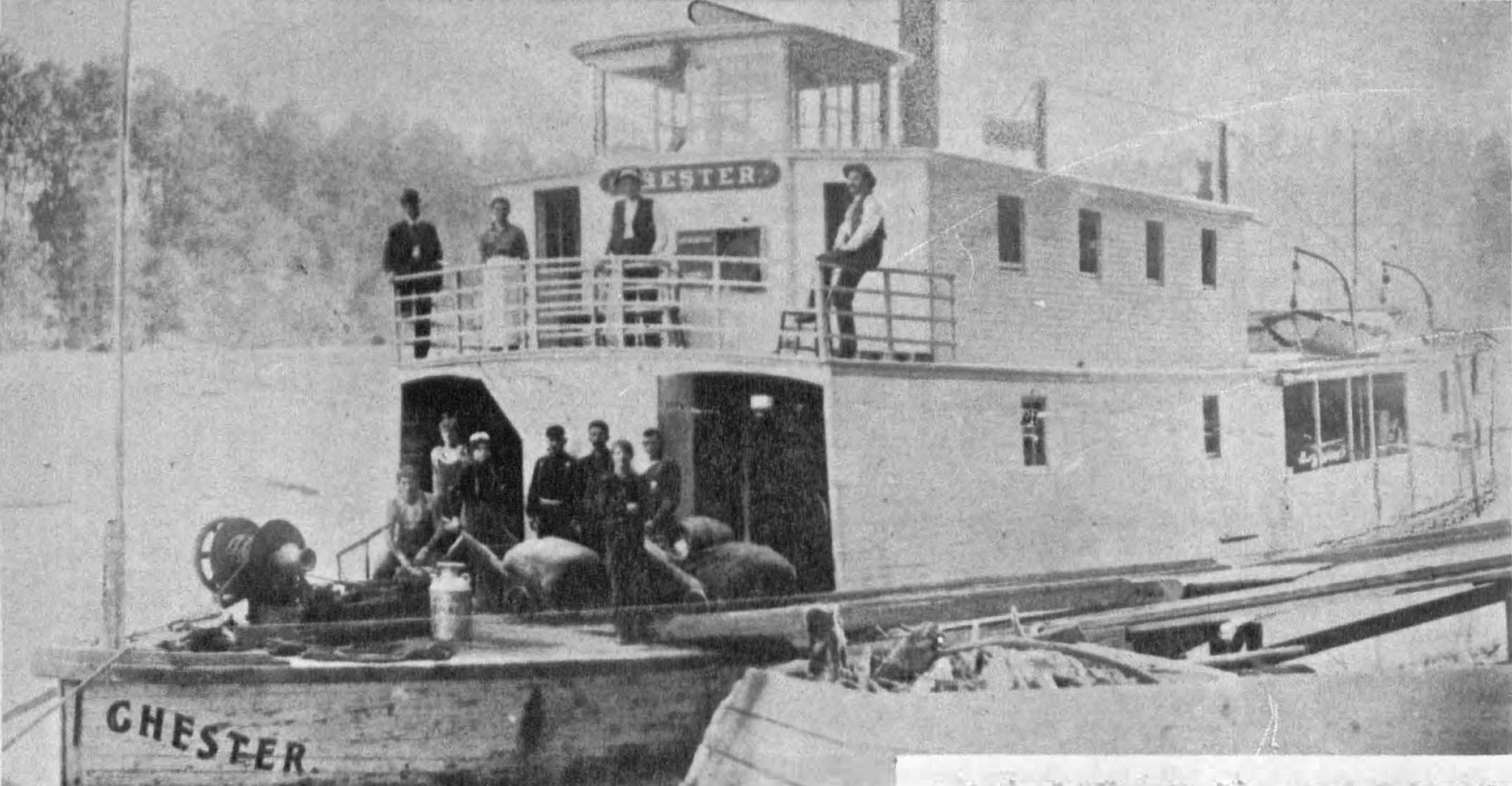
Chester circa 1905 with additional cabin structure added.

Chester was 101 ft (30.78 m) measured over the hull excluding the extension of the deck over the stern, called the "fantail" on which the stern-wheel was mounted. The beam was 20.9 ft (6.37 m). The depth of hold was 3.8 ft (1.16 m).

Chester was reported to have been perhaps the lightest-draft steamboat in the world. As built, Chester drew only 5.5 in (140 mm) of water. By July 1901, the draft had increased to 7.5 in (190 mm) of water.

In 1910, when loaded to full capacity, 60 tons, Chester drew 16 inches of water. This was after additional weight had been added to the original vessel, in the form of added cabins and other structure.

The overall size of Chester was 130 gross tons, a measure of volume and not weight, and 98 registered tons.

The official merchant vessel identification number for Chester was 127201.

=== Model for other steamers ===
The design of Chester was used to construct the Yukon river steamer Koyukuk in 1902. The Tanana and other Alaska sternwheelers were also influenced by the design of the Chester. These steamers were built in Portland and shipped to Alaska in "knocked-down" form to be reassembled on site.

== The Cowlitz route ==
The mouth of the Cowlitz river was on the Columbia river, near Kelso, 45 miles from Portland. The normal head of navigation on the Cowlitz was the town of Toledo, Washington which was 40 miles upstream from the mouth of the river.

The Cowlitz river was also subject to tidal changes. At its mouth the tides could change the water level as much as four feet. This tapered off to zero at a point nine miles up from the river mouth.

Floods, called "freshets" on the river could be extreme, raising the river level as much as 22 feet.

== Operations ==
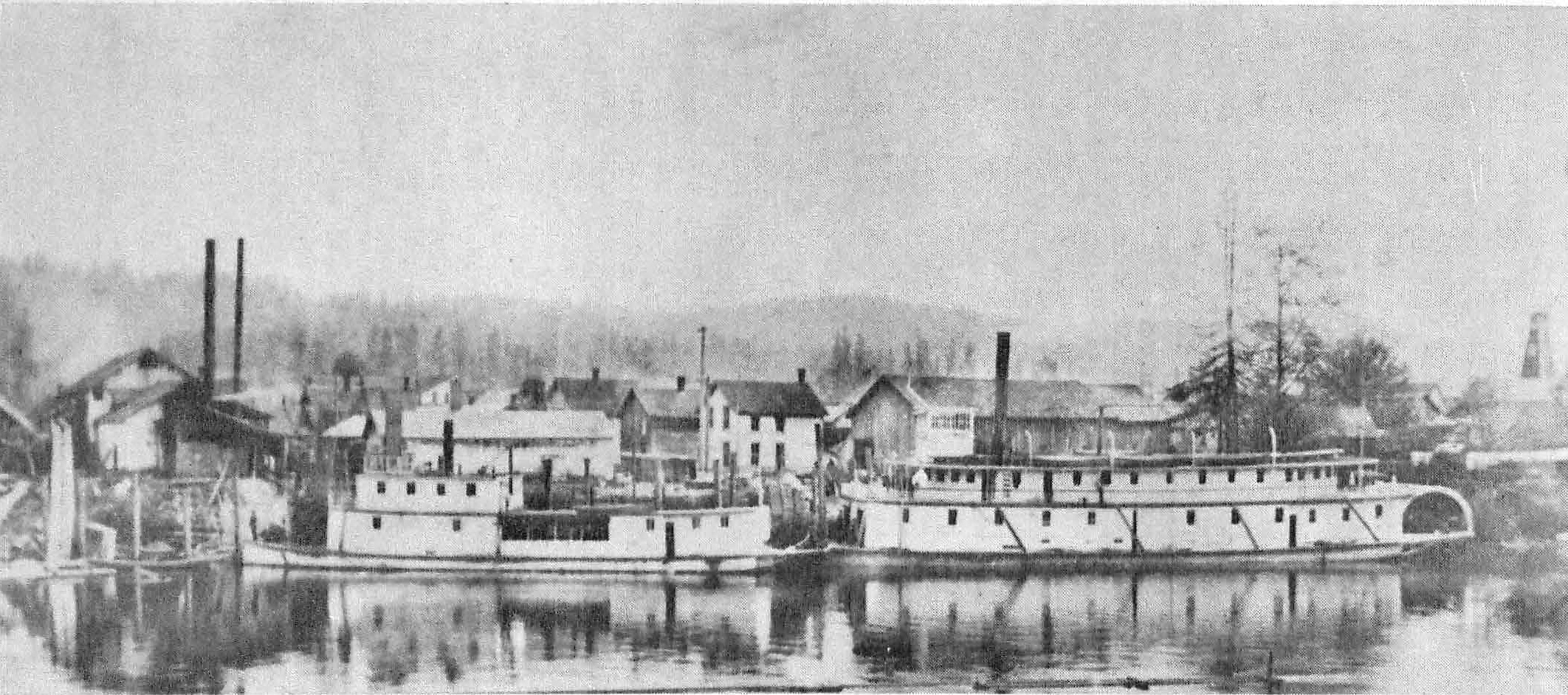
Chester (on left) and Northwest (on right), at Kelso, circa 1905. Chester has the additional cabin structure added after construction which increased the weight and draft of the boat.

Chester was primarily operated on the Cowlitz River, a tributary of the Columbia River which met the Columbia at a point 50 miles downstream from Portland.

In 1905 Chester was owned by the Kellogg Transportation Company and was running on the Cowlitz River between the towns of Castle Rock and Toledo, Washington. At Castle Rock, Chester made a connection with the larger sternwheeler Northwest running out of Portland.

Toledo was the head of navigation on the Cowlitz River. Chester was the only vessel running on the Cowlitz in May 1905, and when it was taken to Portland that month for repairs at the Supple yard, there would be no steamboat service on the river in the absence of Chester.

By 1910 Chester had been replanked several times because its hull was worn out from contact with the river bottom.

In late September 1910, J.T. Reeder was appointed captain of Chester in place of Capt. Albert Otto "Al" Kruse.

In early December 1910, Chester was reported to have made a 15-mile run downstream on the Cowlitz to Castle Rock in the time of 30 minutes. This would have been a usually fast time for Chester, and it was reportedly due to a rapid flow in the river.

== Sinkings, ice, and floods ==
=== Sunk near Olequa Bridge ===
On Friday May 31, 1906, Chester sank in shallow water near the Olequa Bridge after being struck with a large log. The steamer Northwest helped refloat the Chester. Capt. Orrin Kellogg was at the wreck site superintending the work.

All freight on Chester was safely transferred ashore, including a large automobile which belonged to prominent businessman John C. Ainsworth.

On June 8, 1906, Chester was refloated and brought down to Castle Rock for repairs. It was thought that the company might bring legal action against the loggers who had turned loose the log which sank Chester, as this had been done contrary to law and because Chester had recently been sunk from the same cause.

Chester was quickly returned to service, but within a few days had still more trouble with floating logs.

Coming back downriver from Toledo on Sunday, June 10, 1906, the boat encountered a "river full of wild logs." One of the logs struck Chester, making a hole in the hull, but the officers and crew were able to prevent the boat from sinking. The Morning Oregonian commented:

It is said to be against the law for loggers to set logs adrift without accompanying them, but the loggers up this way seem to think they own the river and can do as they please; but after they pay damages a few times it is hoped they will respect the law.

=== Floods ===
In mid-November 1906 Chester was nearly destroyed in a flood on the Cowlitz River when the Kelso rail bridge was carried away. Chester had been moored downstream from the Kelso bridge, and just managed to avoid the debris by escaping down river to a safe place on the opposite bank. With the rail bridge down, the plan became for Chester to transfer rail passengers across the Cowlitz river until the bridge could be reconstructed.

=== Ice ===
In mid-January 1907, ice on the Cowlitz prevented Chester from engaging in operations because of danger to the boat.

== Drownings ==
=== A.P. McKenn 1906 ===
In early December, 1906, A.P. McKenn, a roustabout on Chester fell overboard and drowned when he was trying to rescue another man. The other man was eventually rescued.

=== Arthur "Kelso" Pscherer 1908 ===
At about 1:00 a.m. on the morning of April 11, 1908, Arthur "Kelso" Pscherer, a deckhand on Chester, went missing and was presumed to have fallen overboard and drowned. Pscherer was last seen by the night watchman of the steamer Kellogg crossing the deck of the Kellogg over to the Chester. Pscherer was not thought to have left back across the Kellogg to shore, because all of his effects were still on Chester.

Under the impression that Psherer had fallen in the river and drowned, river men were dragging the river in an effort to recover his body. A reward of $100 was offered for recover of the body. At noon on May 2, 1908, two deckhands of the steamer Nestor, Louis Lindstrom and John Fleshman, found Psherer's body near the Coweeman River, a tributary of the Cowlitz. The body, although badly decomposed, was identified as that of Psherer by local residents who had known him.

== Consideration for other routes ==
=== Rainier-Portland ===
In September 1897 there was talk that the Kellogg company would put Chester on the route between Rainier and Portland, Oregon, running along the slough on the west side of Sauvie Island.

=== Portland-Salem ===
In September 1905, the Oregon City Transportation Company was reported to be considering using Chester on the Willamette River between Portland and Salem, Oregon during low water, but then decided not to do so. The OCTC considered Chester to have too small a carrying capacity, and to be too lightly built, to be hauled over the bars on the Willamette River.

== Dredging operations ==
Navigation on the Cowlitz was often dependent on government-funded dredging and improvement work.

In the Rivers and Harbors Act of June 25, 1910, Congress authorized $22,000 worth of dredging and other navigation improvements to the Cowlitz River to begin in the spring of 1911. The June 25, 1910 act provided for a channel four feet deep from the mouth of the Cowlitz to Ostrander, and from there to Castle Rock the channel would be 2.5 feet deep. Between Castle Rock and Toledo the channel was to be 40 feet wide.

The work would be done by the dredge Cowlitz, which was then operating on the Lewis River. The dredge would start work at Toledo and work downstream.

The channel improvements were expected to draw away some business from the railroads and to allow another light-draft steamer to be operated on the Cowlitz river. The work was to be supervised by Maj. J.F. McIndoe, of the U.S. Army Corps of Engineers.

In April, 1917, lack of government funds for dredging on the Cowlitz and Lewis river forced the dredge Monticello to be tied up at Kelso. Capt. Nelson Delude, who had been in charge of Monticello, shifted over to command Chester temporarily, on the Kelso-Toledo run. Delude had previously worked for the Kellogg company, commanding Chester and Northwest.

== Low water seasons ==
The water was often so shallow in the Cowlitz that cargo could be simply loaded and unloaded from Chester with a wagon. Typically during low water seasons (usually late summer and fall) Chester would be repaired at Portland, generally at the yard of Joseph Supple (1854–1932), or worked on some route other than the upper Cowlitz.

=== Low water 1901 and 1902 ===
In July 1901, Chester was brought in to the Supple yard in Portland for repairs, having been on the Cowlitz route for five years. On Thursday, September 12, 1901, steamboat inspectors Edwards and Fuller inspected Chester at Rainier.

In June 1902, Chester was undergoing repairs, including replanking, at the Supple yards. The Morning Oregonian predicted that once the repairs were complete "she will then be good for another six years."

=== Low water 1906 and 1907 ===
On October 19, 1906, following several months of low water, Chester became the first steamboat to able to navigate on the Cowlitz River.

In early August 1907, floating sawlogs and low water on the Cowlitz forced Chester off the route. Chester would be taken to Portland for repair work.

=== Low water 1909 and 1910 ===
On Saturday, November 8, 1909, the water level had risen sufficiently on the upper Cowlitz for Chester to begin the navigation season.

On June 29, 1910, the Cowlitz had fallen so low that the Kellogg Transportation Company decided to take Chester off the route, even though the steamer drew only 12 inches of water.

Congress had recently appropriated $34,000 for improvements to navigation on the Cowlitz and Lewis rivers, but there was not much hope that dredging would make any different before a natural rise in stream flow restored navigability.

At this time, Chester was connecting at Kelso with the steamer Joseph Kellogg for the run to Portland. During low water in 1910, Chester would be tied up at Kelso.

In mid-October 1910, repairs to Chester were ordered to be made so it could be ready to operate once the navigation season on the Cowlitz resumed. At that time freight could be shipped by water to Kelso on the Joseph Kellogg, but no further upriver due to low water on the Cowlitz. Chester was finally able to return to service on November 10, 1910, having been out of operation since July 2, 1910.

=== Low water 1911 and 1912 ===
On February 6, 1911, the water at Toledo was only 11 inches deep. This was unusually low for that time of year. With Chester then drawing 14 inches of water, the closest it could get to Toledo was four miles downstream.

On February 9, 1911, the water in the Cowlitz was so low that Chester was forced to suspend operations to Castle Rock and tie up at Kelso. However, by February 16, 1911, heavy rains had raised the river level so that Chester could at least reach Castle Rock again. It was not until March 29, 1911, that the river had deepened sufficiently, to 5 feet at Kelso, to allow Chester to attempt to reach Toledo again. Still by April 4, Chester still could not make Toledo, and freight bound for that town had to be off-loaded at a point four miles downstream and taken into Toledo on wagons.

Low water persisted for a long time in 1911, and Chester, following a period of repairs in Portland, was only reported to be able to resume operations to Toledo on Tuesday, November 21, 1911.

In 1912, low water in the upper Cowlitz forced Chester to make its last run for the season from Kelso to Toledo on August 1, even though the boat drew only 12 inches of water.

=== Low water 1916 ===
In 1916, low water prevented from July 29 to November 8 prevented Chester from running from Kelso to Toledo. The water was so low on the Cowlitz in 1916 that the steamer Kellogg could not come up to its usual dock at Kelso. Instead, Chester had to be used as a transfer vessel, running freight between the Kellogg, moored at the mouth of the Cowlitz, and Kelso.

== Disposition ==
Chester was abandoned in 1917 at Kelso, Washington.
