= Joseph Kellogg (sternwheeler) =

Stern-wheel driven steamboat

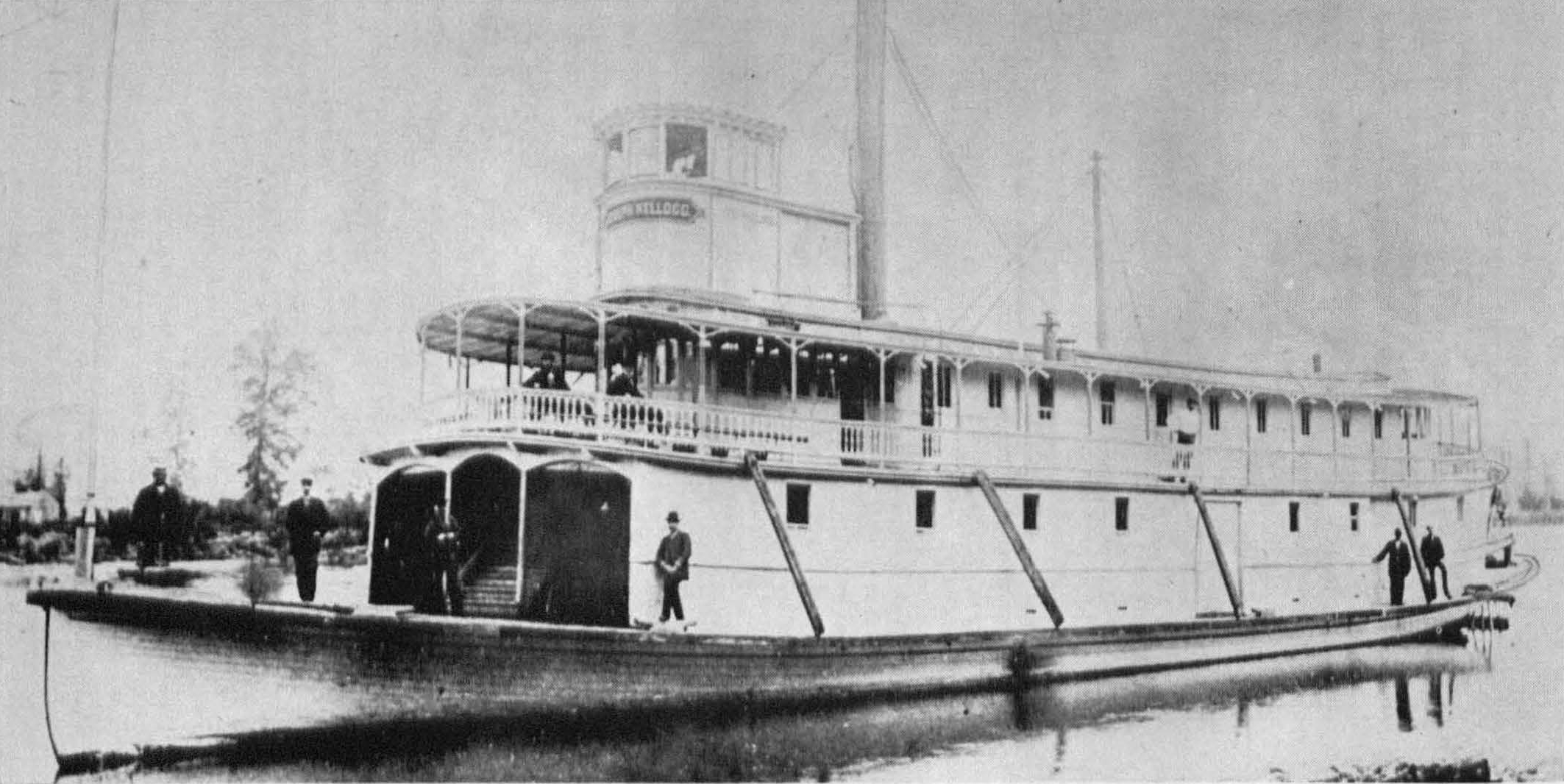
- Joseph Kellogg circa 1885

History
- Name: Joseph Kellogg (1881-1921); Madeline (1921-1929)
- Owner: Kellogg Trans. Co.; Northwestern Trans. Co. Harkins Trans. Co.
- Route: Willamette, Columbia, and Cowlitz rivers.
- In service: 1881
- Identification: US #76267 (1881-1900); 72431 (1921-1929)
- Fate: Abandoned 1929

General characteristics
- Type: inland all purpose
- Tonnage: 322 GRT; 272 RT (1881-1900); 462 GRT; 342 RT (1900-1921); 408 GRT; 336 RT (1921-1929)
- Length: 127.7 ft (38.92 m) (1881-1900); 139 ft (42.37 m) (1900-1929) (measured over hull)
- Beam: 23.4 ft (7.13 m) (1881-1900); 26.5 ft (8.08 m) (1900-1929) (measured over hull)
- Draft: 4.5 ft (1.37 m) (1900-1921) (varied depending on load).
- Depth: 3.4 ft (1.04 m) (1881-1900); 7.2 ft (2.19 m) (1900-1929) depth of hold
- Installed power: twin steam engines, horizontally mounted: cylinder bore 12.5 in (32 cm); stroke 4 ft 6 in (137 cm)
- Propulsion: stern-wheel
- Speed: about 20 miles per hour maximum

Joseph Kellogg was a stern-wheel driven steamboat that operated on the Willamette, Columbia, and Cowlitz rivers for the Kellogg Transportation Company. It was named after the company's founder, Joseph Kellogg (1812–1903). The sternwheeler Joseph Kellogg was built in 1881 at Portland, Oregon.

Joseph Kellogg remained in service for almost 50 years, from 1881 to 1929, and as such was one of the longest serving steamers on the Columbia river system. It was rebuilt at least once, and had to be refloated a number of times after sinking, but it remained a profitable boat for its owners for a long time.

Joseph Kellogg was rebuilt in 1900, also at Portland. In 1921 the name of this steamer was changed to Madeline after it was sold to Harkins Transportation Company. Madeline was abandoned in 1929.

== Design and construction ==
Work on Joseph Kellogg began about the middle of April 1881. The hull was built of cedar except where greater strength was needed, and then white oak was used. The cabins, offices, dining rooms, and seats were built of Oregon ash and maple, with walnut trimmings. The furniture was built from Oregon woods by the firm of Shindler & Chadbourne. Louis Paquet supervised the hull construction. The designs for the rest of the work, including the designs for the cabins, saloon, staterooms and railings, were done by E.E. McClure. All the painting, inside and out, was done by A.D. Brundage. The steamer was launched at Portland, Oregon, upriver from Smith's Mill, in early August 1881.

As built in 1881, Joseph Kellogg was 127.7 ft (38.92 m) long, exclusive of the extension of the main deck over the stern, called the "fantail", on which the stern-wheel was mounted. The beam was 23.4 ft (7.13 m), exclusive of the guards. The depth of hold was 3.4 ft (1.04 m). The overall size of the vessel was 322 gross tons, a measure of volume and not weight, and 272 registered tons. The official merchant vessel registry number assigned in 1881 was 76267.

The deck house and upper works of Joseph Kellogg were built of cedar and other light woods, giving the vessel greater buoyancy and allowing it greater speed. As built there were 16 staterooms with 32 beds. The boat had a "unique kitchen and model pantry" which was characterized as "the envy of every frugal housewife whose good fortune leads her to travel upon it." The steamer had an elegantly designed ladies cabin.

The engines for Joseph Kellogg came from the older steamer Dayton. Dayton had been built at Canemah, Oregon in 1868. The boiler was wood-fired, at least as initially constructed.

== Operations 1881-1900 ==
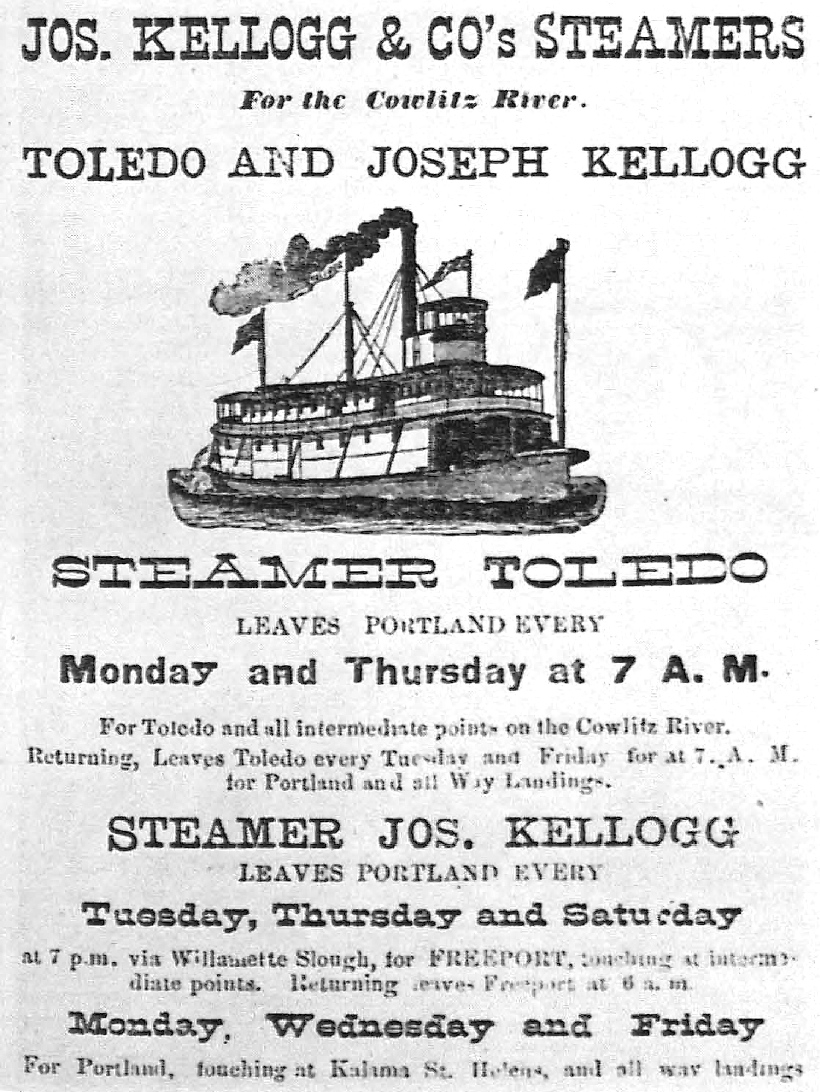
Advertisement for Cowlitz River service by steamers Joseph Kellogg and Toledo, circa 1885

Joseph Kellogg was placed on a route running from Portland to the Cowlitz River. Joseph Kellogg was intended to replace the dismantled sternwheeler Dayton on the route from Portland to Monticello, W.T. (now a part of Kelso, Washington).

Joseph Kellogg was reported to have made its first trip to Monticello on October 27, 1881. According to a contemporaneous source, every member of the boat's company was a member of the Kellogg family.

When the Kellogg Line built another steamer in 1889, the Northwest, Joseph Kellogg made runs from Portland to Northport, Washington (now part of Kelso) and made a transfer to Northwest to proceed further upriver to Castle Rock, Olequa, and Toledo.

Until 1890 Joseph Kellogg was commanded by Charles Kellogg and Orrin Kellogg (1846–1924), the sons of Joseph Kellogg. After 1890 W.P. Whitcomb assumed command.

Joseph Kellogg provided important transportation and financial services for the farmers and settlers in the Cowlitz Valley, according to a report from 1887, describing the business of Orrin Kellogg:

He practically brings the market to the door of these farmers. Oftentimes when the hay, grain and vegetables are loaded, the farmer can get his money by going to the purser;s office as the captain brings the buyers along with him on the boat; if not, he receives the products, puts them in the market at Portland, and sells them, purchases the articles which the farmer orders bought and brings the same and delivers them at the landing. He can sell the products better and purchase the goods lower than the farmer could if he were present, and only charges the simple freight on products and goods.

== Sinkings, collisions and casualties ==
Between 1881 and 1895 Joseph Kellogg was snagged several times and sank, but was always raised without much difficulty, and was still in good condition in 1895.

=== Drownings among crew ===
On April 12, 1887, Sherman S Evans, a deckhand on Joseph Kellogg, drowned after falling overboard when the boat was moored at the foot of Yamhill Street in Portland.

Just over twenty years later, on July 7, 1907, another dockhand, G. Graham fell off Joseph Kellogg while the boat was lying at Rainier, Oregon. Rescue efforts were made, but Graham drowned before he could be reached.

On the night of June 13, 1910, Peter Smith, the night watchman on Joseph Kellogg, went missing and was believed to have drowned. Smith was last seen on deck as he chopped wood. When Smith was noticed to be missing for some time by other crew members, a search was instituted, but he could not be located. Smith had worked on various steamers on the Willamette and Columbia rivers for many years.

=== Collision with Alarm and snags ===
In April 1889, a collision happened between Joseph Kellogg and the propeller steamboat Alarm. The collision resulted in the Portland, East Portland, and Albina Transportation Company, owners of Alarm, bringing a lawsuit in the United States District Court against the Joseph Kellogg, alleging that Alarm had sustained $140 in damage as a result of the collision. The claimants alleged that the collision was solely the fault of Joseph Kellogg being handled carelessly by Charles H. Kellogg, an unlicensed pilot.

As a result of the suit, Joseph Kellogg was seized by the U.S. Marshal's service. The owners of Joseph Kellogg were able to obtain its release from seizure by posting bonds in the amount of $300.

In January 1893, Joseph Kellogg hit a snag near Caples, Washington, and had to be beached to escape sinking, leaving the boat in what was reported to be a badly damaged condition.

On Friday October 12, 1894, Joseph Kellogg sank while it was taking on cargo on the Cowlitz river not far from the river's mouth. The falling tide caused the boat to settle on a snag, making a hole in the hull. Barges and wrecking equipment were secured. The extent of the damage was not immediately known.

The tide had ebbed out unusually far, and the boat hit the snag where it was thought the water was deep enough for the boat to pass. The steamer was beached near Glibbet's mill, and as of Sunday, October 14, was lying there with the bow in the mud and seven feet of water in the engine room. Even so, the damage was said to be "not very heavy." Wrecking barges were dispatched to the scene from Portland, and the steamer was expected to be raised and returned to Portland for repair on that Sunday the 14th. Damage was reported to be $500 by the Steamboat Inspection Service.

=== Stolen boat incident ===
In September 1889 someone stole one of the small boats of the Joseph Kellogg while the steamer was lying at a wharf in Astoria. In July 1890, a boat with the name "Kellogg" on the bow was found in the possession of one John Anderson, at Anderson's ranch on the Oregon side of the Columbia river opposite Coffin Rock. An investigation was conducted, which led to the arrest of Anderson by Constable Al Thomas, who transported Anderson to Portland for examination before a magistrate.

=== Unlicensed pilot ===
In November and December 1888, Charles H. Kellogg handled Joseph Kellogg as pilot without having a pilot's license on the Columbia and Willamette rivers. On Friday, February 8, 1889, pled guilty to the charge of operating a vessel without a pilot's license, and was fined $100.

== Schedules, excursion, and cargo work ==
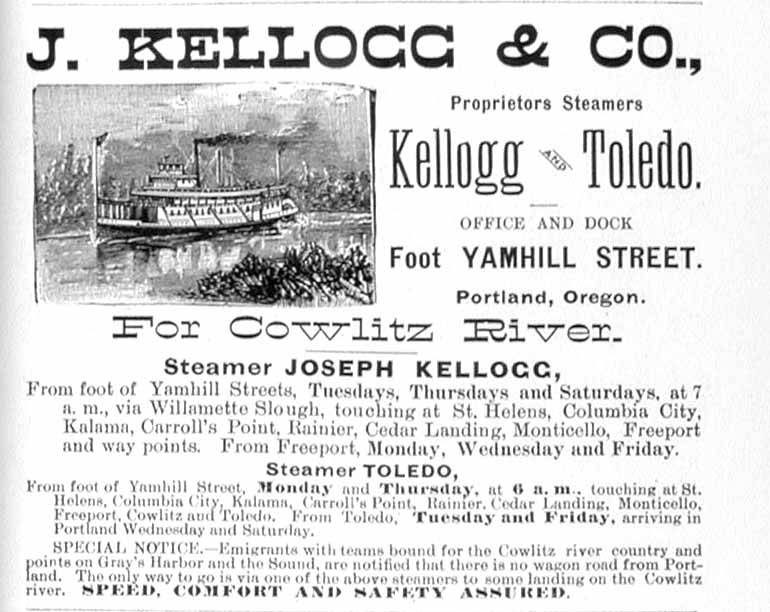
1887 advertisement for steamer service on the Cowlitz River by Joseph Kellogg and Toledo

=== 1882 schedule ===
In 1882, Joseph Kellogg was running on the following schedule: Leaving Portland from the wharf at the foot of Yamhill Street for Freeport, W.T. on Tuesdays, Thursdays, and Fridays at 7:00 a.m. via the Willamette Slough, stopping at St. Helens, Columbia City, Kalama, W.T., Carroll's Point, Rainier, Cedar Landing, Monticello, and all intermediate points.

Returning, Joseph Kellogg departed Freeport on Mondays, Wednesdays, and Fridays at 6:00 a.m. The steamer remained on this schedule until at least August 1882, and later.

=== 1893 schedule ===
In late October 1893 Joseph Kellogg was running on a route from Portland to Rainier, Oregon, on the following schedule: leave Rainer at 5:00 a.m. daily except Sunday, arrive Portland at 10:30 a.m.; returning, leave Portland at 1:00 p.m., arriving back at Rainier at 6:00 p.m.

=== Early excursion work ===
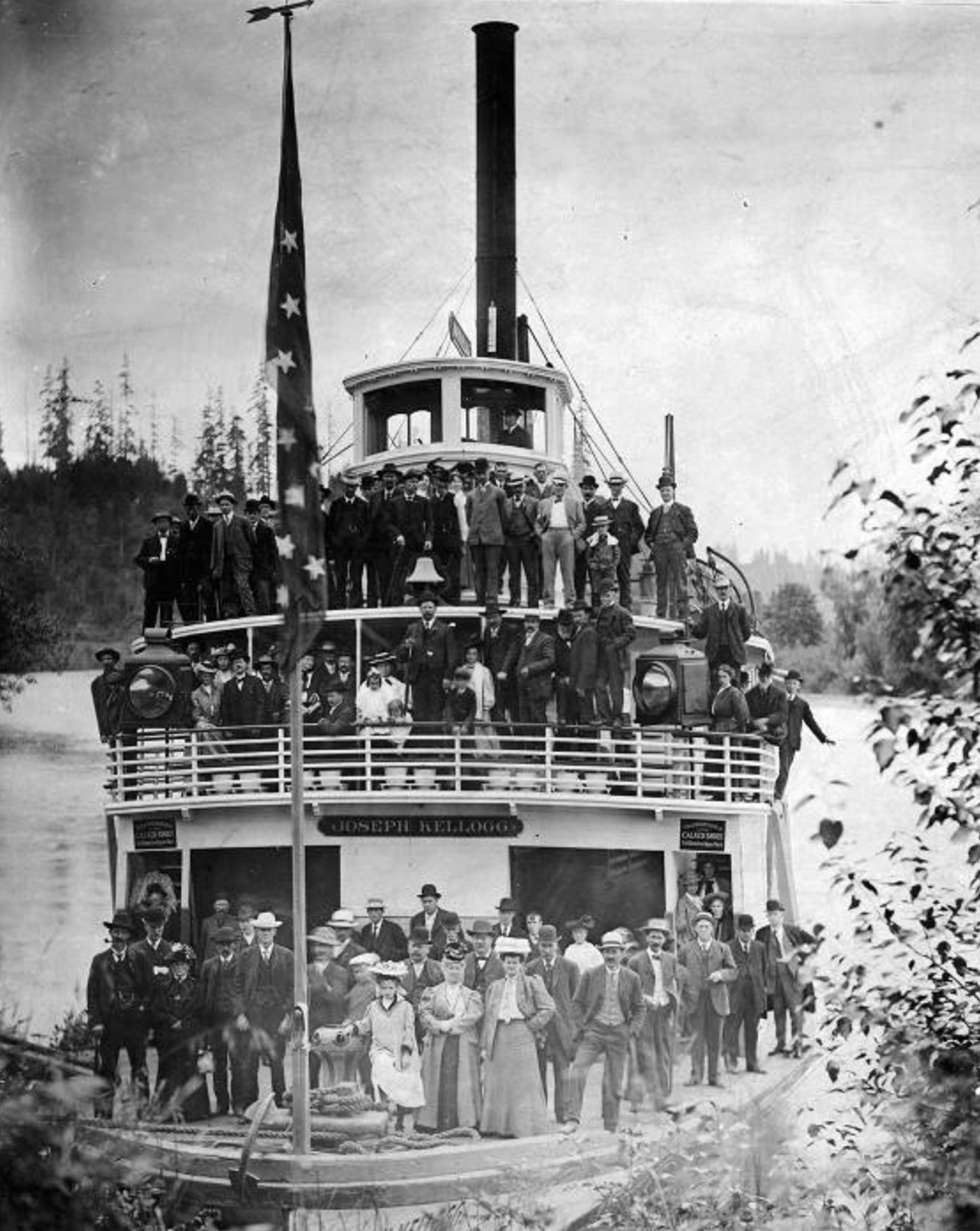
Joseph Kellogg apparently on an excursion, circa 1900

Joseph Kellogg also ran on excursions, including one on July 4, 1882, to Vancouver, W.T, under the personal command of Joseph Kellogg, who was then 70 years of age, and one of the oldest steamboatmen on the river.

On September 24, 1884, there was to be a grand torchlight parade in Portland for the Republican nominees for president, James G. Blaine and vice-president, John A. Logan. Joseph Kellogg would carry people to the parade at half fare.

=== Cargo ===
A cargo shipped out of Kelso in March 1896 on Joseph Kellogg included 350 sacks of potatoes, 64 bales of hops, and 2500 pounds of smelt. On the Wednesday before March 7, 1889, Joseph Kellogg shipped 12,000 pounds of smelt.

In later years, Joseph Kellogg was placed on the wheat trade on the Columbia River. On November 13, 1905, Joseph Kellogg arrived in Portland with one of the few full cargoes of wheat brought from the Inland Empire on the portage railroad around Celilo Falls. The cargo was composed of 2,755 sacks of wheat, or 183 tons. Joseph Kellogg was then under charter to the Regulator Line, which was operating other steamers in the wheat service.

Transport of wheat offered some additional revenue opportunities for some deckhands. On the night of November 17, 1906, Portland police arrested O. Rood, a deckhand on Joseph Kellogg, and charged him with drunkenness. Police claimed that Rood, along with three others who escaped, had sold several sacks of wheat to a saloon keeper in the area of Front and Alder streets. Rood claimed that he had done no wrong, because the grain he had sold had been sweepings only from the deck of the Joseph Kellogg.

== Competition and refit in 1891 ==
=== Competition with Iralda ===
In September and October 1891 competition was keen between Joseph Kellogg and the propeller steamer Iralda. Iralda was then running under Captain Newsome on a route from Portland to Rainier, extending it to Stella, Washington, for a round trip distance of 120 miles covered daily. As of September 11, 1891, Joseph Kellogg was carrying passengers for free, resulting in a large daily list.

=== 1891 machinery refit ===
In late 1891 Joseph Kellogg was withdraw from service to be refitted with a new boiler and a larger stern-wheel. Joseph Kellogg was returned its route by December 4, 1891, and was reported to be capable of increased speed.

== Reconstruction 1900 ==
Joseph Kellogg was reconstructed in Portland in 1900 by Charles Nelson. The machinery from Dayton, built in 1868, continued to be used in the reconstructed vessel.

Reconstruction was done at the Portland Shipyard, and the vessel was approaching readiness for its trial trip on September 6, 1900. Capt. Joseph Kellogg, then age 89, personally built the model for the reconstructed steamer, and supervised its construction.

The reconstructed vessel was 139 ft (42.37 m) long measured over the hull, with a beam of 26.5 ft (8.08 m) and depth of hold of 26.5 ft (8.08 m). and depth of hold of 7.2 ft (2.19 m).

The rebuilt Joseph Kellogg of 1900, at 462 gross tons and 342 registered tons, was much larger than the 1881 original boat. As part of the reconstruction, the cabins from the 1881 boat were shifted over to a new hull.

A new merchant vessel was assigned to the rebuilt Joseph Kellogg, 72431.

== Operations 1900-1921 ==
=== Excursions to Columbia Gorge ===
In the summers of 1905 and 1906, Joseph Kellogg was used on excursions to Multnomah Falls The steamer left from Portland at 8:45 a.m. and returned at 5:30 p.m. Round trip fare was one dollar.

=== Strike by deckhands ===
On August 29, 1906, the deckhands on Joseph Kellogg went on strike. The deckhands wanted longshoremen's wages for loading and unloading the steamer. The owners of the boat were reported to be having some difficulty in locating replacement hands for the strikers.

=== Wrecked 1906 ===
Not long after 1:00 p.m. on October 2, 1906, Joseph Kellogg ran on some rocks shortly after departing the Cascades Locks and Canal bound downriver to Portland. The steamer sustained a large hole in the bow which required it to be beached.

Joseph Kellogg had been moving slowly but was blown over onto the rocks by the strong prevailing wind in the Columbia River Gorge. There were a large number of passengers on board. They were taken on board the sternwheeler Dalles City back to Portland. Temporary repairs were expected to be completed by October 4, after which Joseph Kellogg would proceed to Portland under its own power for a haul out and a more permanent hull repair.

=== 1906 ferry service ===
In the fall of 1906, flood waters washed out the Northern Pacific Railway line between Portland and Tacoma. By November 18, 1906, rail service had been restored from Portland to Castle Rock. From Castle Rock, Northern Pacific would operate the steamers Joseph Kellogg, Georgie Burton, and Undine to carry traffic to point about ten miles up the Cowlitz River where rail transport to Tacoma could be resumed.

=== Ice in 1907 ===
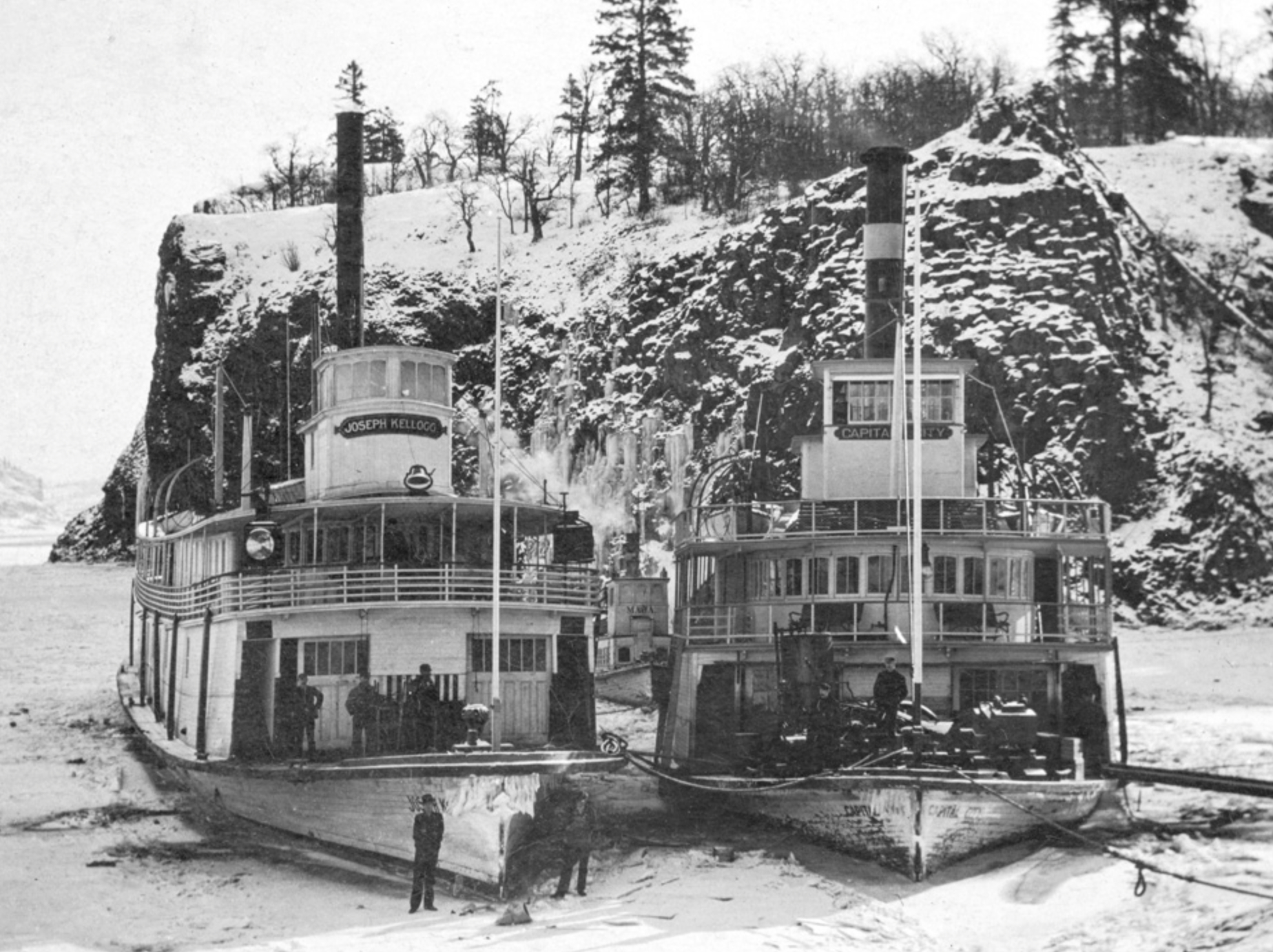
Steamers Joseph Kellogg (left) and Capital City (right) frozen in ice near Hood River, January 17, 1907. Smaller steam tug Maja is visible between the two larger steamers.

In January 1907 ice blocked navigation in the Columbia Gorge. The temperature was 8 degrees below zero, the coldest it had been in 8 years in Hood River. Joseph Kellogg, and another steamer, the sternwheeler Capital City, were frozen in the ice, and were abandoned by their officers and crews, who went to Portland.

Captain Frederick H. "Fred" Sherman and a watchman remained on board Joseph Kellogg to keep an eye on the vessels. The steamers were considered to be in a safe place until a thaw set in. This was at Stanley's Landing three miles upriver from Hood River. The small steam tug Maja was also trapped with Joseph Kellogg and Capital City.

=== Charter and excursion work ===
In April 1907 Joseph Kellogg was operating under charter to the north bank railroad to help construct a rail line along the north bank of the Columbia river.

On June 16, 1907, the Commonwealth Coal Company chartered Joseph Kellogg for a free trip for businessmen from Portland to take them to inspect the company's mining properties near the Cowlitz river. There were additional chartered excursions to the mines that summer, with the last one scheduled for August 25, 1907, although the later trips were restricted to stockholders, the company being anxious to sell its stock at the price of $14 a share.

Joseph Kellogg was engaged in a number of charter excursions for various organizations such as the Y.M.C.A. and the Royal Hibernians. The steamer made numerous runs from Portland to The Dalles.

=== Low water 1907 ===
Joseph Kellogg was put back on the Cowlitz river run in the summer of 1907. On August 4, 1906, the water in the Cowlitz river was too low to allow even the smaller steamer Chester to reach Telodo, the traditional head of navigation, from Kelso, near the mouth of the river. Instead, Joseph Kellogg would run on the Cowlitz, but only to Ostrander, Washington, about four miles upriver from Kelso.

=== Mechanical refit 1911 ===
In May 1911, Joseph Kellogg was taken off the Cowlitz River route to have a new boiler and sternwheel shaft installed at the Supple yard in Portland. In place of Joseph Kellogg the Sarah Dixon would be operated on the Cowlitz river run under charter from the Shaver Transportation Company. Kellogg Transportation Co. was reported to be considering building a new shallow-draft steamer with the machinery removed from the Joseph Kellogg.

=== Fast trip to Kelso ===
On Sunday, June 16, 1912, Joseph Kellogg made what was believed to be a record fast trip to Kelso from Portland in three hours and five minutes. The total distance was 58 miles, with the steamer having to comply with speed limitations going downriver in the Willamette. The return trip took about three and a half hours.

=== Automobile transport ===
In July 1913, Joseph Kellogg carried a party of automobile excursionists on this trip who were returning to Puget Sound from the Rose Festival. Roads between Vancouver, Washington and Kelso were then so poor that automobiles often had to be transported by water to Kelso.

=== Low water in the Cowlitz 1913 ===
On Friday, September 26, 1913, the water level in the Cowlitz River had fallen to 4.5 ft (1.37 m) at Kelso. Joseph Kellogg, which drew 4.5 ft (1.37 m) of water could not reach Kelso and had to tie up at Rainier, Oregon. The steamer was reported to be considering using the tide to reach Kelso in the following week.

=== Charter to People’s Navigation Company ===
In March 1919, Joseph Kellogg was operated under charter to the People's Navigation Company, running from Portland to The Dalles, while the P.T. Company's other steamer, the sternwheeler Tahoma was under repair in Portland.

== Sale to Northwestern Transportation Company ==
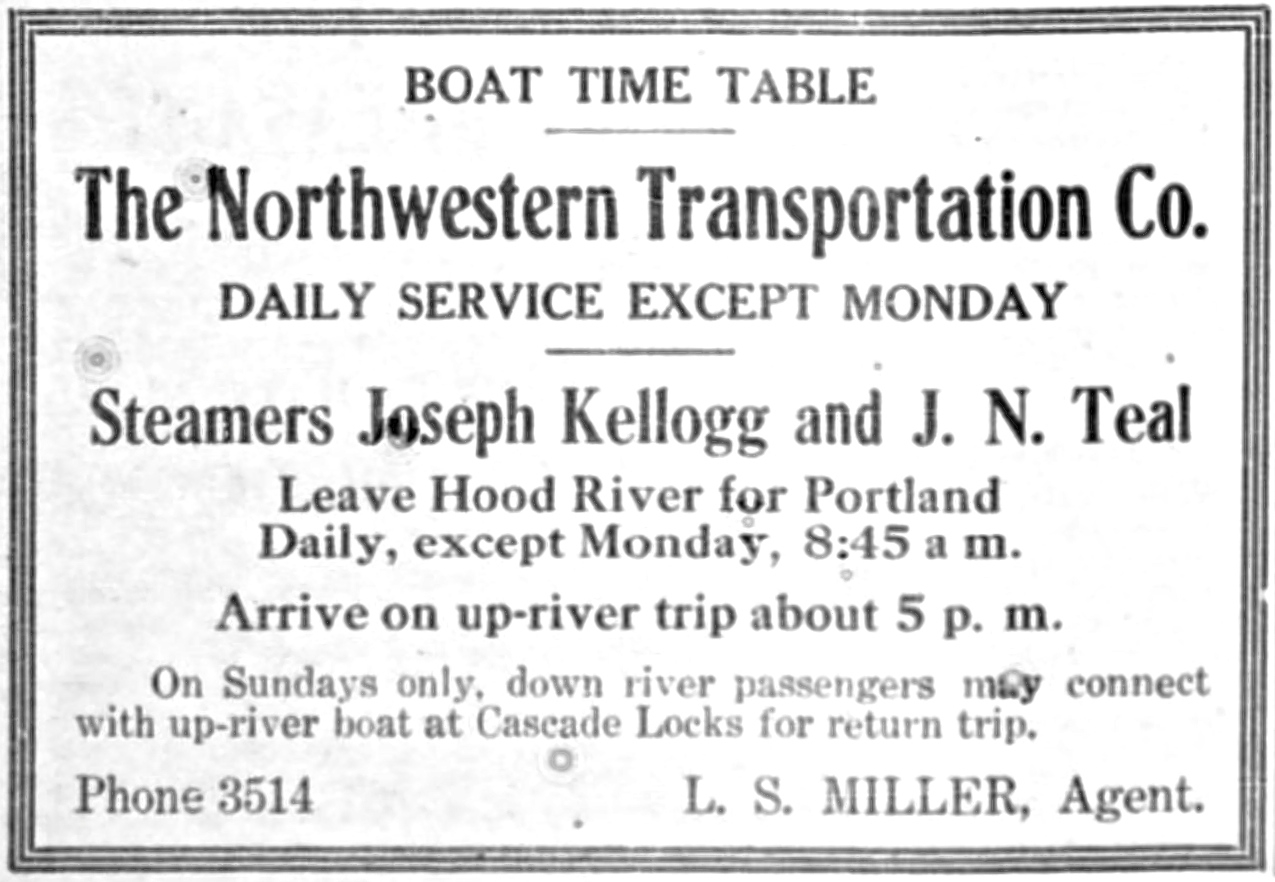
Advertisement for steamers of the Northwestern Transportation Company, placed May 6, 1920, in the Hood River Glacier

On April 1, 1920, the Kellogg Transportation Company sold Joseph Kellogg to the Northwestern Transportation Company, who were the owners of the sternwheelers Olympian and J.N. Teal. The price was not disclosed publicly.

The purchase was occasioned by the need of the Northwestern Transportation Company to move the large amount of freight that had been accumulating in The Dalles. The water level in the Columbia had fallen too low to allow the Olympian to reach The Dalles, and J.N. Teal was out of service in dry dock.

Joseph Kellogg would leave the Taylor Street dock in Portland for The Dalles on Tuesday, Thursday, and Saturday nights. Once repairs to J.N. Teal were complete, Joseph Kellogg would operate on alternate days running to the days with J.N. Teal.

The new owners planned to add a texas, that is, an upper deck cabin structure, and to improve the crew's quarters.

== Sale to Harkins Transportation Company ==
In 1921 Joseph Kellogg was acquired by Harkins Transportation Company, renamed Madeline and assigned a new official merchant vessel number, 77341. In the years just after World War I, Harkins Transportation Co. was the last major surviving passenger steamship line operating on the Columbia River.

== Operations as Madeline ==
=== Fare war with Iralda ===
A fare war broke out in the summer of 1921 between Harkins Transportation and Madeline's old rival, Iralda.

This had been the first rate war on the Columbia in many years. It began when Iralda, operated by Lawrence H. Holman (1885-1941), cut its rates to $1 each way from Portland to Astoria.

The Harkins line responded by lowering its fares to $1 on some of the runs of its propeller steamer Georgiana. Madeline was running on the Astoria round, that summer, departing every other evening at 7:30 p.m. from Portland. Fares on Madeline were not affected by the rate war.

=== Steamer service to The Dalles ===
By August 1922, the Harkins line had also acquired the Iralda, and intended to maintain daily steamer service to The Dalles from Portland using both Iralda and Joseph Kellogg.

In July 1922, Harkins Transportation Co. planned to put Madeline on a route running tri-weekly from Portland, at the Alder Street dock, to The Dalles. The business opportunity arose from the withdrawal of J.N. Teal to the Snake River to replace the sternwheelers Spokane and Lewiston which had been destroyed by fire in July 1922.

The Harkins line was going to seek out business from fruit shipments to the Portland market, and was considering establishing new agencies and arranging for new warehouses.

Madeline would make connections with Georgiana, Lurline, and Undine, providing through freight service from Astoria to The Dalles.

== Disposition ==
Madeline was abandoned in 1929.
