= Northwest (sternwheeler) =

1889 steamboat in United States

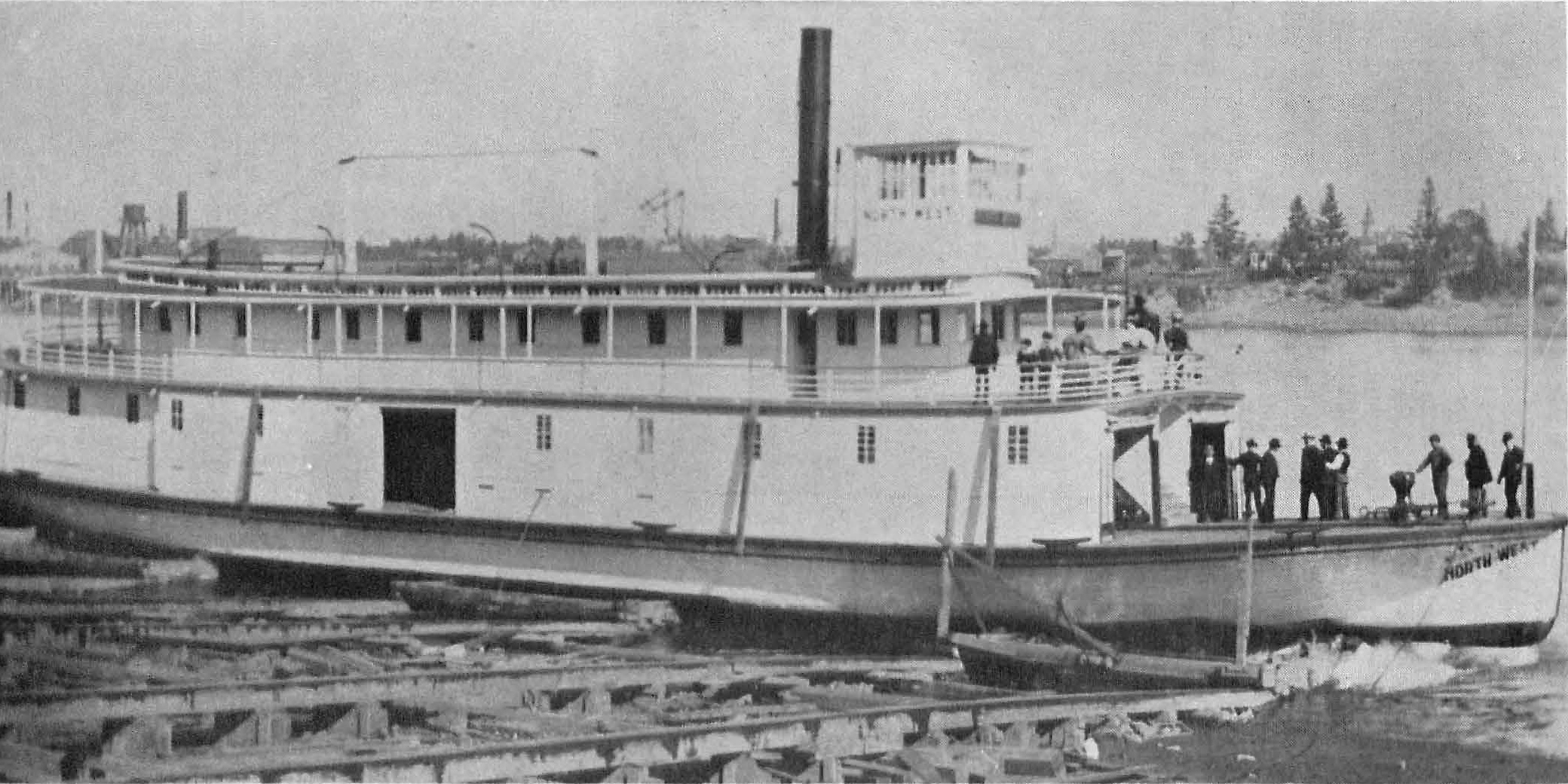
- Launch of Northwest at Kelso, Washington, 1889.

History
- Name: Northwest
- Owner: Kellogg Transportation Co.(1889-1907); North Coast Land Co.(1907)
- Route: Columbia, Cowlitz and lower Willamette (1889-1907); Skeena River (1907)
- In service: 1889
- Out of service: 1907
- Identification: U.S. #130459
- Fate: Sunk on the Skeena River

General characteristics
- Tonnage: 324 GRT; 301 RT
- Length: 135 ft (41.15 m)
- Beam: 28 ft (8.53 m)
- Draft: 11 in (28 cm) light; 22 in (56 cm) with 90 tons freight
- Depth: 3.8 ft (1.16 m) depth of hold
- Installed power: twin steam engines, horizontally mounted: cylinder bore 12.5 in (32 cm); piston stroke 4 ft 6 in (137 cm)
- Propulsion: stern-wheel

Northwest was a steamboat that operated on the Columbia, Cowlitz and lower Willamette rivers from 1889 to 1907. In 1907 Northwest was transferred to Alaska, where it sank on the Skeena River

This vessel should not be confused with several similarly named vessels operating at about the same time in the same region, including in particular the Northwest, a sternwheeler built in 1877 at Columbus, Washington, and dismantled in 1885.

== Construction ==
Northwest was built at west Kelso, Washington in 1889. Joseph Kellogg himself supervised its construction.

== The Cowlitz River route ==
Northwest was specifically designed to run on the Cowlitz River. The Kellogg Transportation Company already had two sternwheelers running on the Cowlitz, the Joseph Kellogg and the Toledo. When the water was high on the Cowlitz, Joseph Kellogg could travel as far as Toledo, Washington, the conventional head of navigation on the river. Toledo also operated to the town of Toledo, which was named after the steamboat.

In the late fall of 1887 business on the Cowlitz was so good that Toledo could not handle it all, so the company decided to build a new steamer, which was to become the Northwest.

== Dimensions and design ==
Northwest was 135 ft (41.15 m) long exclusive of the extension of the deck over the stern called the "fantail" on which the stern-wheel was mounted. The beam was 28 ft (8.53 m) exclusive of the long protective timbers along the upper sides of the hull called guards.

Northwest had a depth of hold of 3.8 ft (1.16 m). Northwest drew 11 in (28 cm) of water when light (without cargo) and 22 in (56 cm) when laden with 90 tons of freight.

As built, there were five passenger staterooms on board. Twelve additional berths were installed in 1897. The overall size of the steamer was 324 gross tons (a measure of volume and not weight) and 301 registered tons. Northwest was fitted with electric lights.

The official merchant vessel registry number was 130459.

== Engineering ==
Northwest was driven by a stern-wheel which was turned by twin single cylinder steam engines, each with cylinder bore 12.5 in (32 cm); piston stroke 4 ft 6 in (137 cm). These engines generated 9.6 nominal horsepower. Alternative engine size reported to be cylinder bore 12.0 in (30 cm); piston stroke 4 ft (120 cm).

== Early career ==
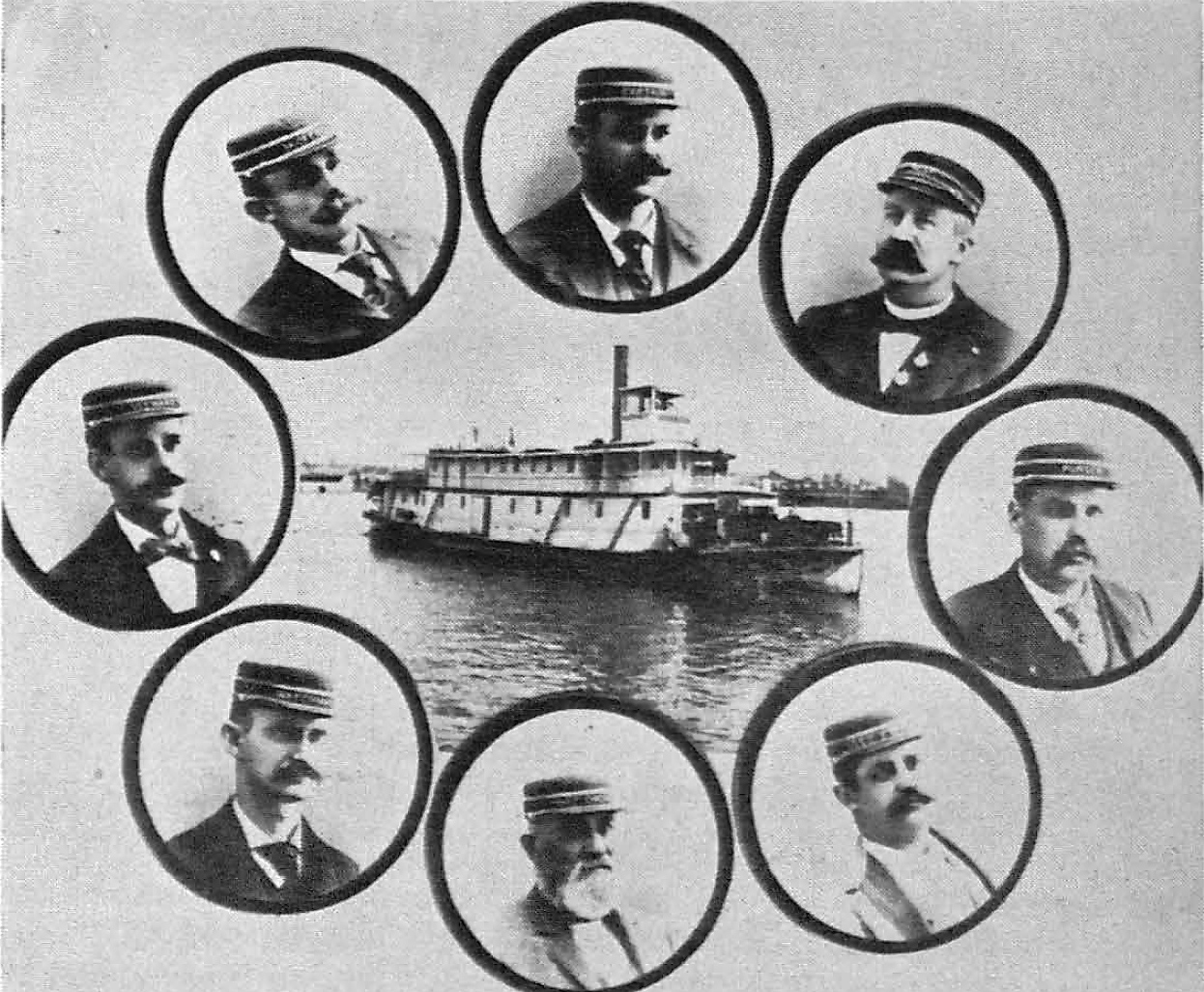
Northwest and officers, circa 1895.

Northwest made its first trip on the Cowlitz River just before Christmas 1889. According to one history, from 1889 to 1895 Northwest was operated on the Cowlitz River under Captains Orrin Kellogg and his uncle, Edward Kellogg.

A typical round-trip fare from Toledo to Portland cost $2.50. Freight was shipped at $3.00 per ton. The minimum charge for small items such as packages was 25 cents.

=== Flood rescue ===
During a flood in Portland in early February, 1890, Northwest and its crew salvaged two warehouses from floating down river first by attempting to remove their contents before the flood reached them and then, after the buildings had floated free into the current by chasing them as they drifted along.

=== Willamette river service ===
In January 1891, Northwest was running on the route from Portland to Salem, Oregon. Northwest continued to operate on the Portland-Salem run at least through early April 1891, when plans were being made to transfer the steamer to a route on the Columbia. Northwest and another steamer owned by the Kellogg company, the Toledo, were viewed as opposition boats on the Willamette river by one newspaper, and their withdrawal to run on the Lewis and Cowlitz rivers was seen as a blow to competition.

=== Homicide on board ===
On afternoon of Sunday October 11, 1891, when Northwest was in the Cowlitz River near Freeport, Washington, a deckhand Dan Boyd, while slightly intoxicated, threw another deckhand, Charles McLane, over the side and into the river. This produced the death of Charles McLane. There was reportedly no provocation for the crime. Boyd was arrested and placed under the guard of Constable Medlock. While guarding Boyd, the constable accidentally dropped his revolver which discharged, shooting himself through the knee.

== Early operations on the Cowlitz river ==
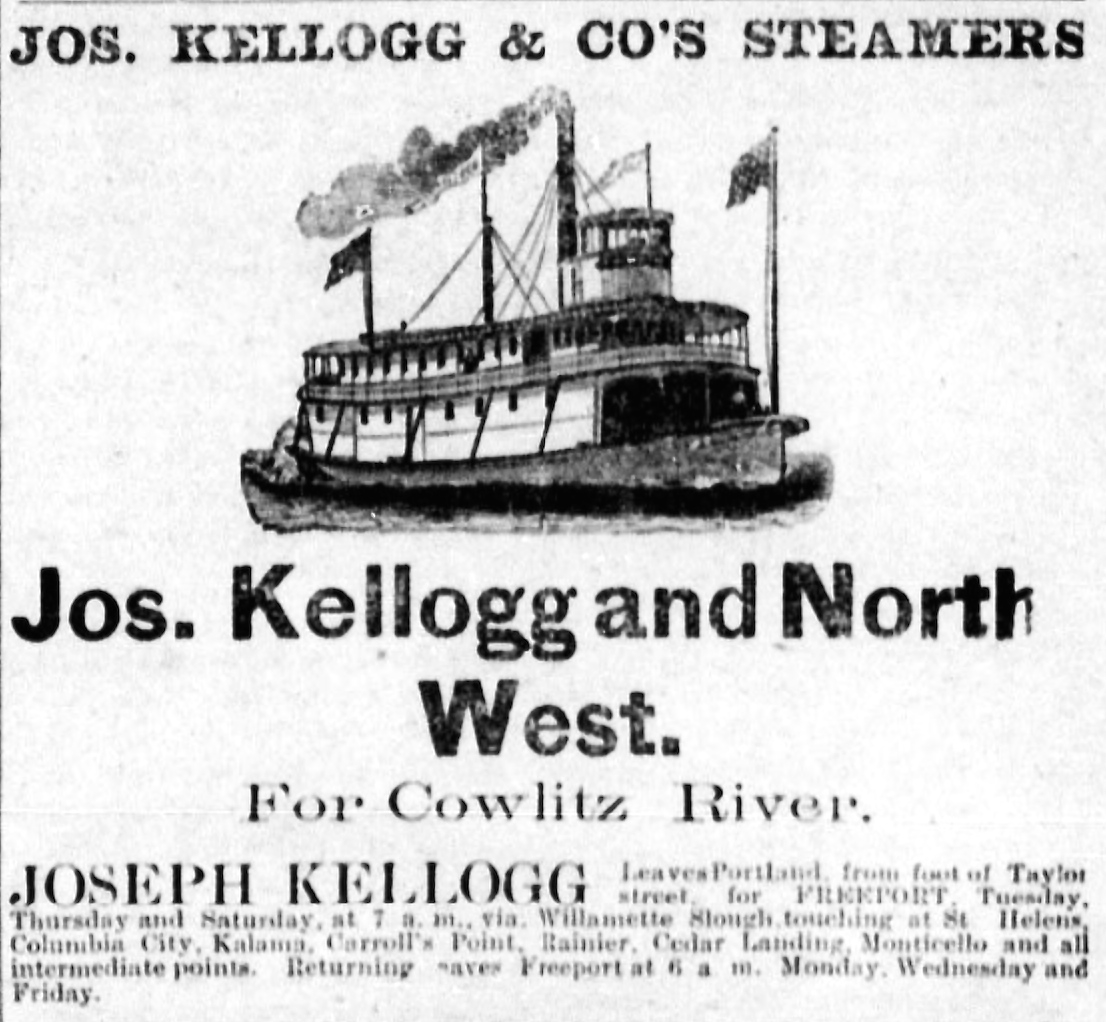
Advertisement placed in the Oregon Mist (St. Helens), by Kellogg Trans. Co., August 21, 1891.

=== 1891 schedule ===
By September 11, 1891, Northwest was running on a route from Kelso to Portland. Northwest ran on the following schedule: Leave Kelso Monday, Wednesday and Friday at 5:00 a.m.; Leave Portland Tuesday, Thursday, and Saturday at 6:00 a.m. Northwest made connections with the Northern Pacific Railway line at Kelso, Castle Rock and Olequa for traffic bound southbound to Portland or northbound toward Puget Sound.

Northwest ran on this schedule up to November 24, 1893. Business then fell off on the river so that Northwest was making only one trip a week.

In April 1896 Albert Otto "Al" Kruse was purser on the Northwest.

=== Mining boom spurs business ===
In the spring of 1897 a mining boom caused business for the Northwest so much that the steamer could return to its schedule of three trips per week. In April 1897, Northwest was making night trips between Portland and the Cowlitz river, departing Portland on Mondays, Wednesdays, and Fridays at 10:00 p.m., and returning to Portland on Tuesday, Thursday, and Sunday nights.

Northwest could not operate year-round on the Cowlitz river to Toledo due to low water, generally seasonal, on the river. To address this issue, the Kellogg Transportation Company built the small very light draft sternwheeler Chester. When Northwest could not run on the Cowlitz due to low water, passengers and cargo would be transferred to Chester. Deckhands on Northwest would find themselves having day duty on Chester and night duty on Northwest.

In the summer of 1901, the mining district around Mount St. Helens, then described as a "former" volcano, was reported to have significant prospects. The Morning Oregonian recommended taking either the Northwest or the Northern Pacific railroad to Castle Rock or Winlock, Washington, then proceeding overland by stage coach to Toledo, and from there up various roads and trails to the mining district.

=== Schedule 1902-1905 ===
On July 18, 1902, H. Holman, agent for the Kellogg Transportation Company, advertised Northwest as running on the route from to Toledo, on the following schedule: Leave Portland from the wharf at the foot of Salmon street at 10:00 p.m. for Kalama, Carroll's Point, Rainier, Kelso, and Toledo, arriving at Toledo at 10:00 a.m. the following day. Returning, Northwest departed Toledo on Tuesdays, Thursdays, and Sundays at noon, arriving at Castle Rock at 5:30 p.m., and arriving at Portland early in the morning.

The larger steamer Joseph Kellogg also ran on the same route on alternating days, except Kellogg drew too much water to go further upriver than Kelso.

Northwest remained on this schedule at least until September 1905

== Later career on the Cowlitz ==
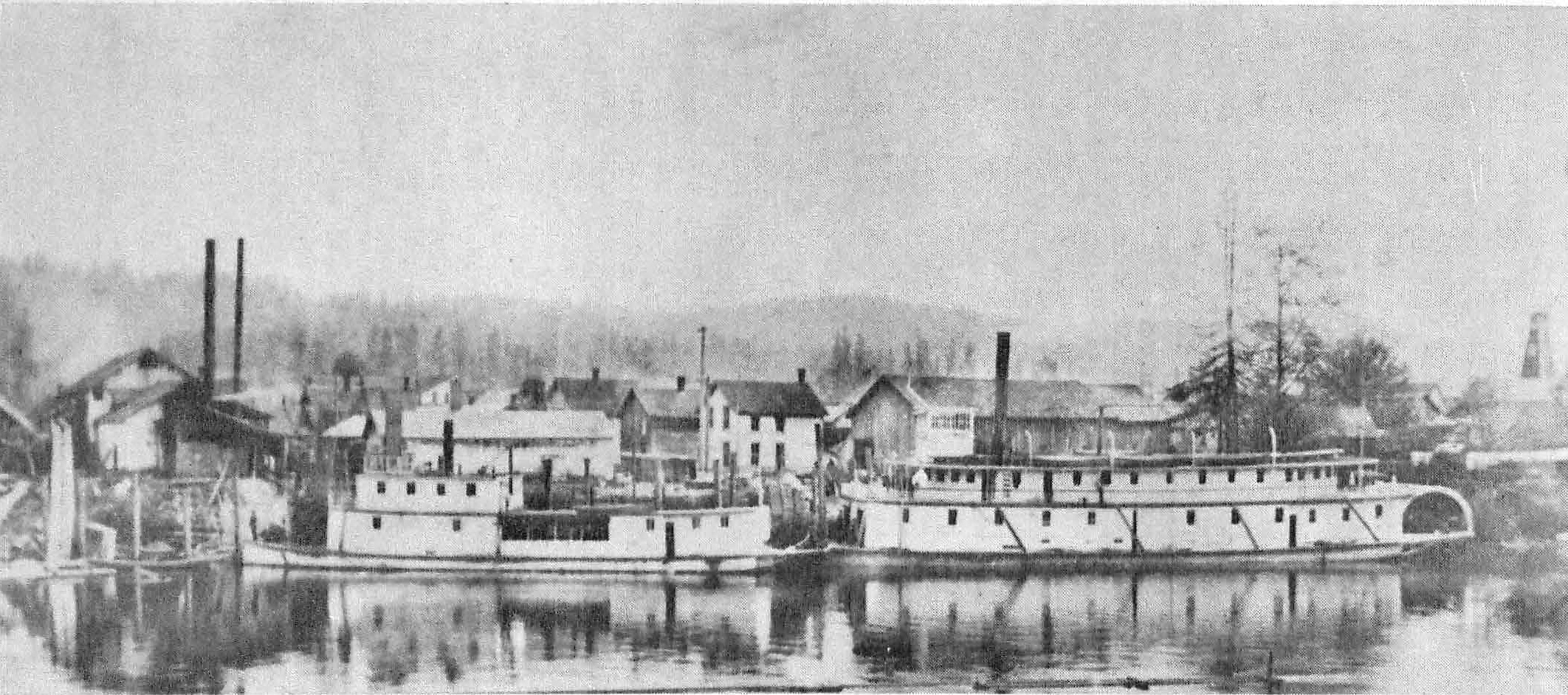
Chester (on left) and Northwest (on right), at Castle Rock, circa 1905.

=== Labor dispute ===
On September 10, 1902, marine engineers on a number of vessels went on strike. The total number of engineers in the union was about 140, and of these about 70 walked out on the first day of the strike. The engineers left their vessels as the boats returned to Portland.

Among the reasons for the strike was the rate of pay for engineers, who sought a 10 percent increase. The highest wage then paid on the river for a chief engineer was $100 per month. The engineers proposed that wages be set depending on the type of steamer, and dividing the steamers then operating into first, second and third classes.

First class boats, such as the Bailey Gatzert would pay their chief engineers $110 under the proposal from the union. Second class boats, which were more numerous than the first class, and which included Northwest, would pay chief engineers $100 per month and assistants $75 per month.

Wages were to be in addition to accommodations on board while in service. The engineers also wanted $5 per day for harbor or towing work lasting less than three days, with 12 hours constituting a day. Boatyard service would be compensated at $3.50 per day, with 9 hours being a day.

=== 1906 schedule ===
In April 1906 the schedule had been altered somewhat, with Northwest departing Portland on Monday and Thursday at 6:00 a.m. for Toledo, Castle Rock, and way points, and returning to Portland on Wednesdays and Saturdays at 2:00 p.m. This route was being advertised as the "best and cheapest route to the St. Helens mining district." As with the 1902 schedule, the steamer Kellogg ran on alternate days, but no farther than Kelso.

=== Drownings in 1906 and 1907 ===
At about 1:30 a.m. on August 31, 1906, John L. Sinclair (1885–1906), a deckhand on Northwest, fell off the boat and into the Cowlitz river, where he drowned. The cause of the accident was not immediately known, but Sinclair was reported to have been slightly under the influence of liquor. Sinclair's parents lived in Oregon City.

News of Sinclair's drowning was passed to Oregon City Police Chief Burns by long-distance telephone call, and he gave the news to Sinclair's parents. Following a search of the river, Sinclair's body was dragged up the afternoon of the day of the drowning, by Mrs. Alex Day, of Kelso.

Early in the morning of February 7, 1907, Jack Neil, cook on Northwest, lost his footing while trying to board. He stumbled and fell off the gangplank into the river.

According to one report, another crewman jumped into the water and grabbed hold of Neil, but the cook could not be resuscitated. The incident occurred while Northwest was moored at Portland.

However, conflicting stories later emerged as to whether Neil's fall into the river had been caused by a fight or altercation. Nevertheless, Deputy Coroner Arthur L. Finley found that Neil's death had been accidental.

== Sunk in the Cowlitz river ==
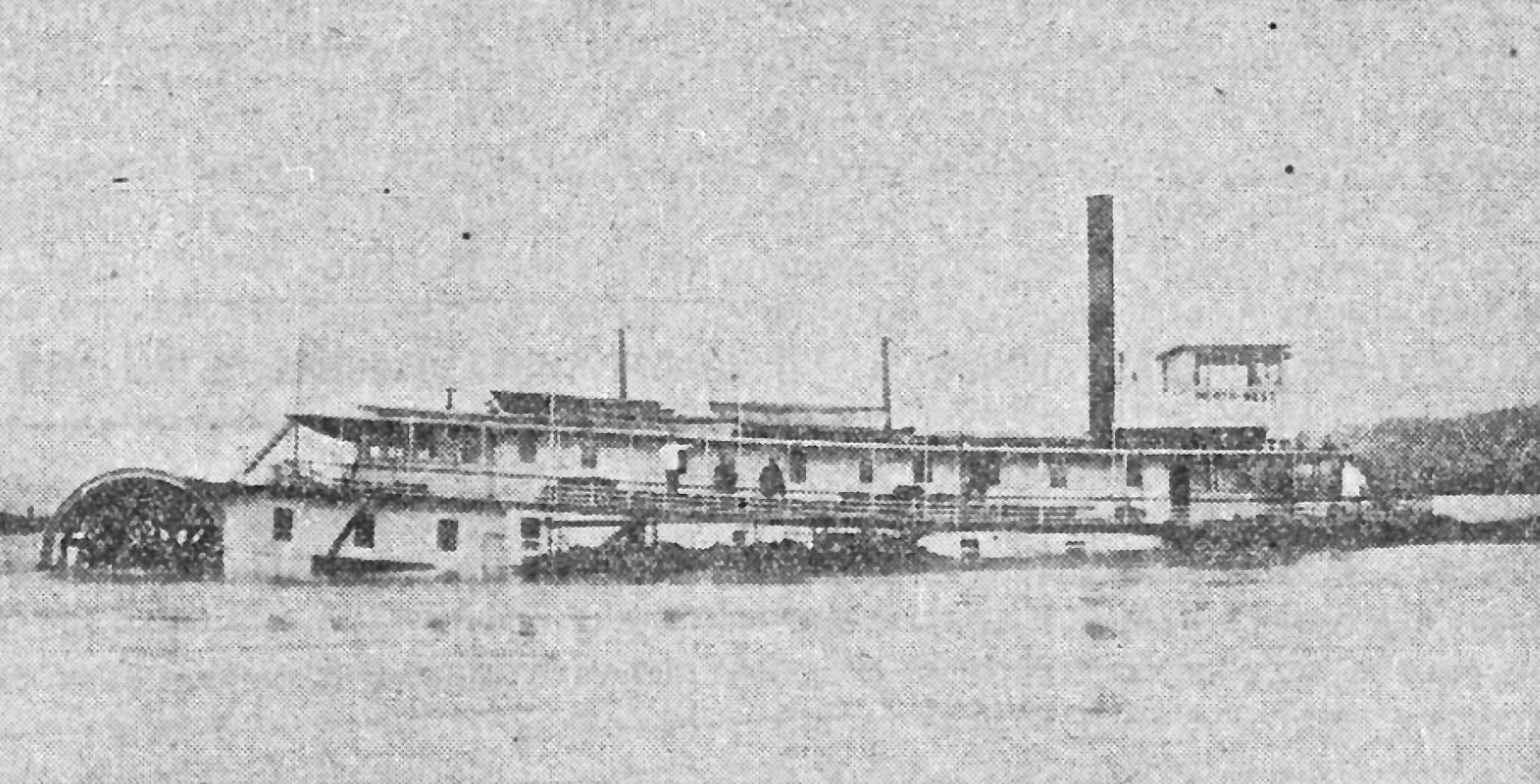
Northwest sunk in the Cowlitz River, November 5, 1906.

On Friday, November 2, 1906, Northwest, running back on the Cowlitz river to Portland, struck a rock about three miles upriver from Kalama. Northwest was beached immediately and passengers and crew taken off the boat with no harm.

The next day, the sternwheeler Georgie Burton was dispatched to the scene, carrying divers, wrecking equipment, and towing two barges.

The Kellogg Transportation Company chartered the sternwheeler Altona to take the place of Northwest until the sunken boat could be returned to service. The company anticipated that Northwest could be raised with little difficulty.

By November 8, 1906, Northwest had been raised and was being taken to Portland by the sternwheeler Wauna, supported by two wrecking barges, to be repaired. Northwest was returned to service on November 20, 1906.

== Charter by Northern Pacific ==
In mid-November 1906 the line of the Northern Pacific Railway was washed out, and the railroad had to charter steamboats to transfer passengers from Castle Rock around the washouts. At first the railroad chartered Undine, but when the water level in the Cowlitz fell too low for Undine, the railroad hired Northwest.

== Transfer to British Columbia ==
According to one source, in 1907 Northwest was purchased by the North Coast Land Company to be used to support its land development at Telkwa in the Bulkley Valley. Another source, states that Northwest was sold to the Grand Trunk Railway to be transferred to the Skeena River.

=== Preparations for transfer ===
The steamer arrived at Astoria, Oregon on the afternoon on April 9, 1907, with Capt. G.W. Adams in command, from Portland and Vancouver en route to Vancouver, British Columbia, and thereafter to the Skeena River.

Originally the plan was to send Northwest north alone under its own power, but this was judged too risky, although several similar runs had been made by river boats unassisted or unattended by tugs. Instead the decision was made to hire a tug to escort Northwest, but as of April 11, 1907, no tug had been available.

While waiting, work was done to strengthen Northwest for the trip, including boarding up the bow, and stiffening the hull. This work was supervised by Capt. A. Crowe, of Portland. According to one report, this strengthening work was done at Vancouver, Washington.

=== Voyage north ===
An escort tug was located by April 12, to proceed in company with Northwest. Northwest would use its own power and the tug would only assist in an emergency.

On April 15, 1907, at 1:35 p.m., Northwest and the tug Tatoosh departed Astoria for British Columbia. Northwest arrived in Vancouver BC without incident 34 hours later.

=== Refit in Vancouver ===
After arriving in Vancouver, Northwest was "thoroughly overhauled and made to comply with the Canadian regulations governing steamships." The steamer's boiler had been condemned, and had to be replaced, which delayed the boat's entry into service.

According to the Daily Colonist:

As fitted up she is now complete with modern boilers of ample capacity and engines fitted for the development of the high power required on the Skeena river. She has all modern conveniences, electric lights, search lights, full passenger accommodation and a passenger capacity of 150, stateroom accommodation adequate to the needs on the river and a freight capacity of 150 tons.

== Operations on the Skeena River ==
On May 18, 1907, under the command of Captain Bonser, Northwest left Vancouver bound for Port Essington, BC, at the mouth of the Skeena River. Northwest was reportedly the "swiftest and most comfortable" of the Skeena river steamers, and was intended to make weekly round trips between Port Essington and the head of navigation on the Skeena, Hazelton, BC, a distance of 180 miles.

Northwest was then owned by the B.C. Transportation & Commercial Co., of which C.C. Holiday was the general manager. The company was reorganized from the New Commercial Company of Grand Forks, ND which had settled over 20,000 people in Alberta and the Canadian Northwest. The company was backed by Canadian and American capitalists of ample means.

On Friday, June 14, 1906 Northwest was able to reach Hazelton, BC on the Skeena River with a full load of cargo and all the passengers the steamer could carry. Most of the passengers were settlers bound for the Bulkley Valley.

Northwest had made it through the Kitselas Canyon which normally was impassable during the high water of that time of year. Northwest was scheduled to depart downriver on Saturday, June 15, to be able to make connections with coast steamers at Port Essington, BC.

== Disposition ==
Northwest was wrecked on the Skeena River in 1907. According to a contemporaneous wire report, Northwest was a total wreck on the Skeena River. Northwest had been carrying 100 tons of freight and a large number of passengers the time of the wreck. All the passengers and part of the cargo were saved. The boat had been owned by the British Columbia Transportation & Commercial Company when the wreck occurred.
