= James Clinton (sternwheeler) =

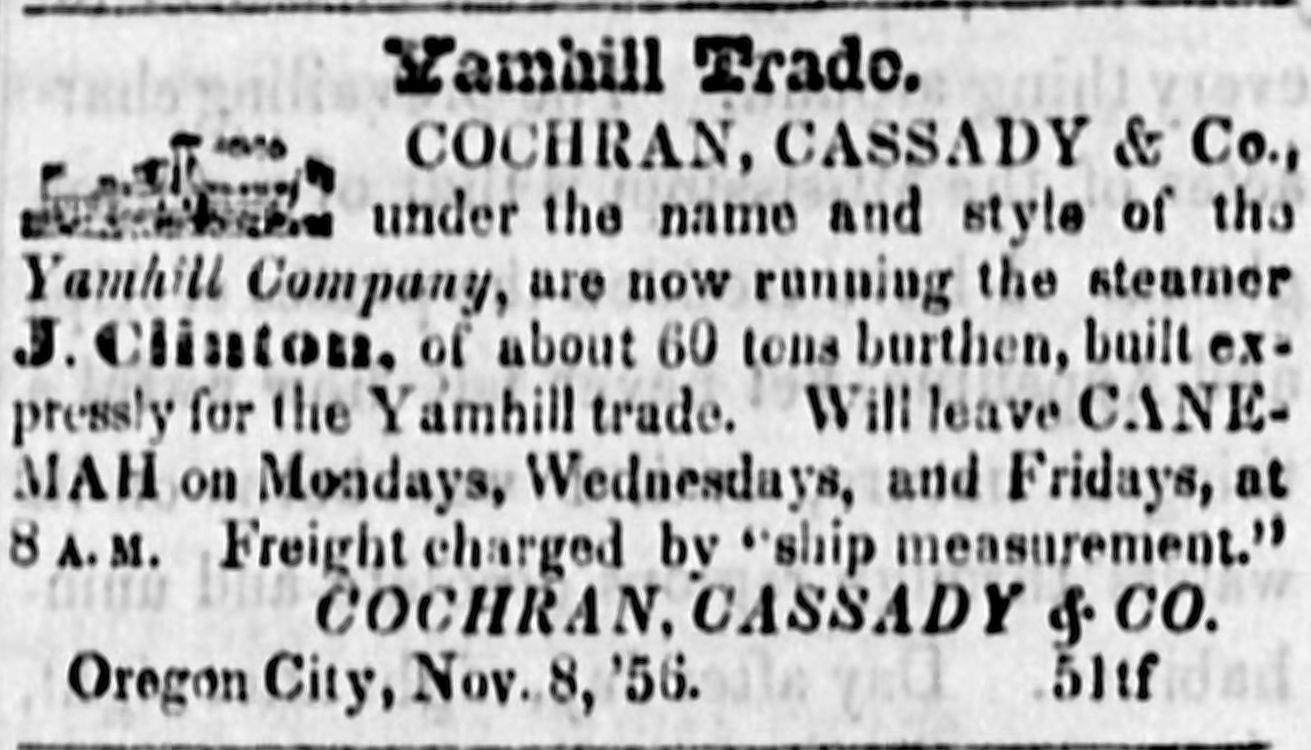
- Advertisement for James Clinton Nov. 15, 1856

History
- Name: James Clinton
- Owner: Cochran, Cassady & Co.; James D. Miller; People’s Transportation Co.
- Fate: Destroyed by fire April 23/24, 1861, at Linn City, Oregon

General characteristics
- Type: inland steamship
- Length: 90 ft (27.4 m) exclusive of fantail
- Beam: 16 ft (4.9 m) exclusive of guards
- Depth: 4 ft (1 m) depth of hold
- Propulsion: twin steam engines, horizontally mounted; stern-wheel

James Clinton was a steamboat which operated on the upper Willamette River from 1856 to 1861. Although the Clinton was said to have been "not a very good boat.", it was the first steamer ever to reach Eugene, Oregon. James Clinton was destroyed in April 1861, when a large fire broke out at Linn City, Oregon in a shoreside structure near to where the vessel was moored.

== Construction ==
James Clinton was built at Canemah for the Yamhill River trade by Cochran, Cassedy & Co. The boat was designed to go to Dayton and Lafayette, on the Yamhill, during most of the year. Construction of the steamer was underway by April 5, 1856. The boat was expected to be placed in operation in June 1856. The builders were captains Cassidy, John Gibson, and John Wilson Cochran.

Clinton was launched on July 19, 1856. At that time, the only steamers operating above Willamette Falls were Enterprise and Hoosier.

James Clinton was 90 feet long, exclusive of the extension over the stern, called the "fantail, on which the stern-wheel was mounted. The boat was driven by twin steam engines, horizontally mounted, each with bore of 9 in (228.6 mm) and stroke of 4 ft (1.22 m).

With the completion of Clinton in early October 1856, there were now five steamers operating on the Willamette above the falls. In addition to Clinton, there was the sternwheeler Enterprise and the side-wheelers Hoosier, Franklin (ex Minnie Holmes ex Fenix), and Canemah. In addition, a sixth vessel, the sidewheeler Portland was being brought up around the falls.

== Operations ==
James Clinton made its trial trip on Monday, October 6, 1856. The initial officers of the boat were: John Cochran, captain; John Boston, clerk; Christian E. Sweitzer, pilot; and Willam Cassedy, engineer.

On November 8, 1856, Cochran, Cassady & Company, the owners of James Clinton, doing business as the Yamhill Company, placed the steamer on a schedule running to the Yamhill River from Canemah, departing every Monday, Wednesday, and Friday.

=== First steamboat to Eugene ===
On March 12, 1857, James Clinton was the first steamer to reach Eugene It took the Clinton three days to reach Eugene City from Corvallis. The distance on the river between the two cities was 53 miles. The citizens of Eugene had promised to purchase $5,000 worth of stock in the Clinton if the steamer could reach the city, and it was later said that "it is altogether probable that Captain Cochrane would have taken her through if it had required three weeks instead of three days." When the Clinton did arrive in Eugene, the entire town turned out to greet the steamer.

Two of the leading investors were brothers A.A. and David McCully. They and other persons in Eugene and Harrisburg directed their considerable shipping business to the Clinton instead of hauling it overland by ox team to New Orleans Landing, which was the previous head of navigation. New Orleans or Orleans Landing was opposite of Corvallis. The stock subscriptions from the Harrisburg and Eugene investors formed the basis of the very successful People's Transportation Company, and financed a new steamer, the Surprise, built at Canemah in 1857.

The McCullys invested $3,000 in the Clinton to achieve independence from steamboat lines.

=== Sale to James D. Miller ===
In 1858 James D. Miller purchased the James Clinton.

=== Trouble at Woodyville ===
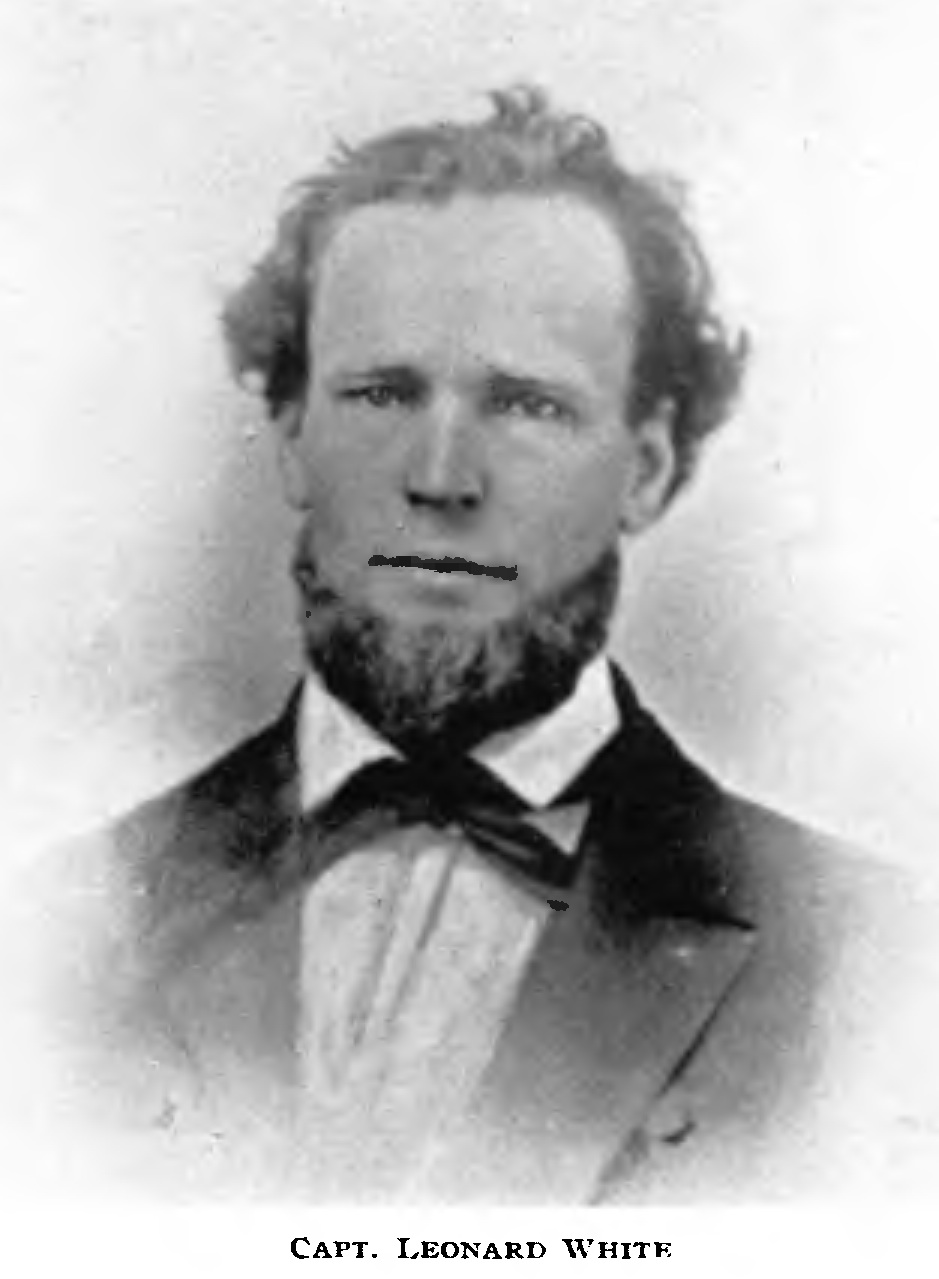
Leonard White, a captain of James Clinton

In 1852 or 1853, a man named Woody set up a saloon at a place on the Willamette River about two miles north of the present town of Junction City, from which Woody dispensed a type of liquor known as "blue ruin." Woody had a large number of relatives and these and others formed a settlement which was called Woodyville, or more commonly, Woody's Landing.

The Woodys declared Woody's Landing to be the head of navigation on the Willamette, and for a time this appeared to be the case. However, they were prone to pilfering the goods dropped off at the landing, and if anyone complained, they were roughed up by one or more of the large and bellicose members of the Woody family, or Woody tribe, as they came to be called.

The local shippers tired of having to deal with the Woody tribe, and established a different landing, Coffman's, up a slough which cut through a part of the Woody land claim. The Woodys claimed the steamboat could not use the slough, and threatened a trespass action. They also felled small trees along the banks of the slough to impede navigation, which the Clinton had to clear out, often with the help of locals who disapproved of the Woodys.

=== Continued problems at Lancaster ===
The Woodys eventually sold out to the Mulkeys, who changed the name of the place to Lancaster. While there had been some hope for improved relations with the advent of the Mulkeys, they soon proved to be just as bad, so much so that they became known as "Woody Tribe No. 2."

On the night of Friday, January 21, 1859, the Clinton, running under command of Leonard White, came near to destruction at the hands of the Mulkeys who wanted to stop it from calling at landing downstream from Eugene City. The Clinton needed to reach a warehouse at Coffman's Landing, which was situated on a slough that ran on the west side of the Willamette River. The slough ran through a land claim on which another warehouse, in Lancaster was located. The Mulkeys, as the Woodys before them, were opposed to use of the slough by the Clinton to reach Coffman's Landing, and had threatened a lawsuit for trespass.

On the night of January 21, the Clinton had arrived at Lancaster after dark, and waited until 10:00 p.m. for the moon to rise. Woodyville was located about two miles north of present-day Junction City

While they were waiting, they heard people chopping down small trees alongside the banks of the slough. When the steamer began moving up the slough, it took two hours to clear out the obstructions. While the crew of the steamer was doing this, the people who had cut down the smaller trees, cut nearly through a large tree, and waited with lanterns for the steamer to approach. When the boat did so, the people on the bank started chopping avidly at the tree, bringing it just a few seconds too late to destroy the steamer.

Leonard White recognized four of the wood choppers and knew the names of three of them.

=== Later operations ===
The McCully brothers, who had invested $3,000 into the Clinton, were instrumental in founding the People's Transportation Company in the early 1860s. They brought the James Clinton into the P.T. Company as one of its first boats. On March 10, 1860, the James Clinton continued to make regular trips to Lafayette, Oregon, running three times a week, Mondays, Wednesdays, and Fridays from Canemah under Capt. James D. Miller. On Mondays, James Clinton left Oregon City promptly at 8:00 a.m., due to its schedule carrying the mail to Champoeg. The Clinton made connections at Oregon City with the steamer Express running on the lower river to Portland.

== Destruction by fire ==
James Clinton was destroyed by fire at Linn City on the night of April 23/24, 1861. The Clinton and another steamer, Relief, having arrived in the afternoon, were moored in the boat basin upriver from the works of the Oregon Milling and Transportation Company, The fire originated in the company's warehouse and quickly spread. There was later talk that the cause might have been arson.

People tried to save the two vessels, both built entirely of wood, and they were successful in the case of the Relief, which even so was still damaged. The Clinton however caught fire, burned to the water's edge, and sank. Loss to the owners of the Clinton, Capt. James D. Miller, John T. Apperson, and others, was about $6,000.
