= Alert (1865 sternwheeler) =

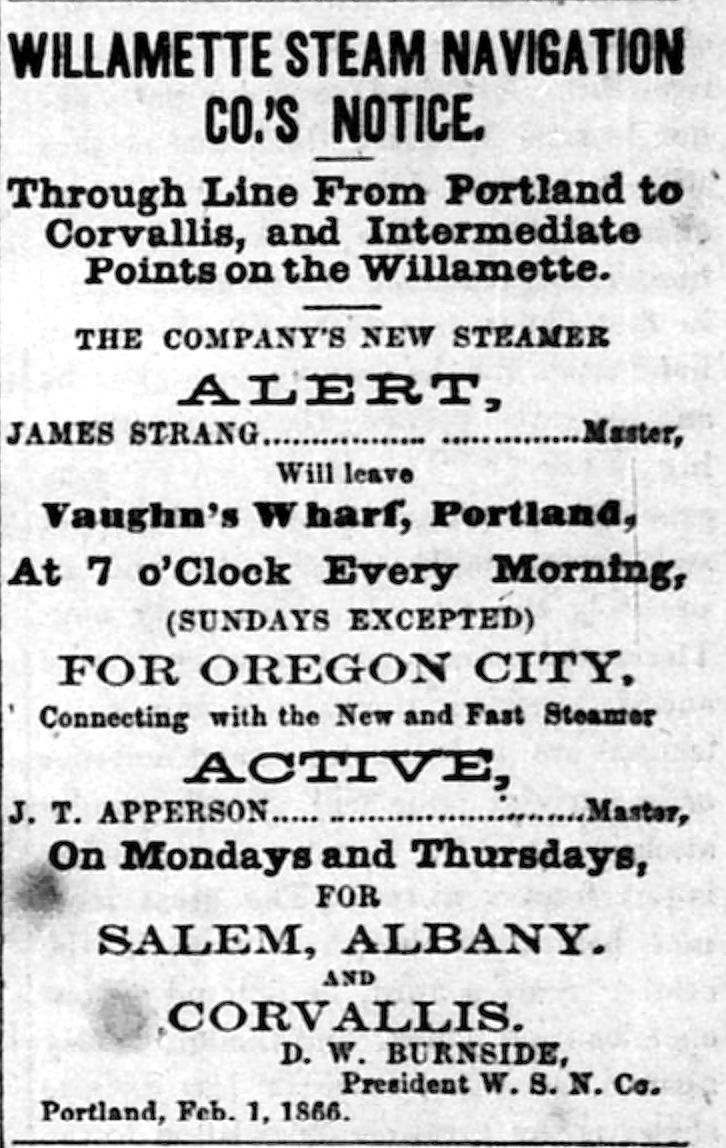
- Advertisement for Alert and other steamers, March 17, 1866.

History
- Name: Alert
- Owner: Willamette Steam Navigation Co.; People's Transportation Co.
- Route: Willamette River
- Builder: Louis Paquet
- In service: 1865
- Out of service: 1875
- Identification: US# 1233
- Fate: Dismantled

General characteristics
- Type: inland steamboat
- Tonnage: 340.83 gross tons
- Length: 135 ft (41.1 m), exclusive of fantail
- Beam: 25 ft (7.6 m), exclusive of guards
- Depth: 5 ft (2 m) depth of hold
- Installed power: twin steam engines, single-cylinder, horizontally mounted, each with bore of 16.5 in (42 cm) and stroke of 5 ft (1.52 m), 13 nominal horsepower.
- Propulsion: stern-wheel

Alert was a sternwheeler steamboat which operated on the Willamette River, in Oregon, United States, from 1865 to 1875. Originally built for and owned by the Willamette Steam Navigation Co., it was soon acquired by the People's Transportation Company, a steamboat line which held a near-monopoly on Willamette River transportation. This vessel was rebuilt in 1871, and ran until 1875, when it was dismantled.

== Construction and dimensions ==
Alert was built at Oswego, Oregon, in 1865 by the firm of Paquet & Brown, and launched on December 8, 1865. Alert was 135 ft (41.1 m) long, exclusive of the extension of the main deck over the stern, called the "fantail" on which the stern-wheel was mounted. Alert had a beam (width) of 25 ft (7.6 m) and depth of hold of 5 ft (1.5 m).

Alert measured out at 340.83 tons according to the official merchant vessel registry. The official merchant vessel registry number was 1233.

Alert was driven by two single-cylinder steam engines, horizontally mounted, each with a cylinder bore of 16.5 inches and a piston stroke of 60 inches. In 1874, the steam engines of Alert developed 74 horsepower.

== Operations ==
=== For Willamette Steam Navigation Company ===
Alert made its trial trip on January 18, 1866. The initial officers of Alert were James Strang, master; Edward Fellows, engineer; H. H. Johnson, purser; Jerry Driscoll, mate.

As of March 1866, Alert was operating on a daily run (Sundays excepted) from Portland to Oregon City, departing from Vaughn's wharf at 7:00 a.m. under Capt. James Strang. At Oregon City, the route connected with the steamer Active, which, under John T. Apperson, master, departed Mondays and Thursdays for Salem, Albany, Corvallis and downriver waypoints. At that time, Alert and Active were both owned by the Willamette Steam Navigation Company, of which D. W. Burnside was president.

=== For People's Transportation Company ===
In December 1866, Alert was owned by the People's Transportation Company, of which Asa Alfred McCully (1818–1886) was president. Capt. Ephraim Weston Baughman took over as master after the steamer had been acquired by the People's Transportation Company. According to one source, in 1868, Baughman was succeeded by captains Joseph Kellogg and George A. Pease. Another, contemporaneous, source, states that Captain Kellogg was in charge of Alert on the Portland to Oregon City run as of December 1, 1866.

Under the winter shipping arrangements of the company, Alert departed Portland daily at 7:00 a.m., for Oregon City, where it connected with steamers running to points on the upper Willamette River, upstream from Willamette Falls. The Reliance ran on Mondays and Thursdays to Corvallis, Oregon; the Fannie Patton ran to the same city on Tuesdays and Fridays; the Active ran every Wednesday for Harrisburg, Lancaster, and Eugene; and Union ran on Mondays, Wednesdays and Fridays for Dayton and Lafayette on the Yamhill River.

In late September 1869, Alert used a bell to sound its arrival, in a dense fog, at the dock in Oregon City. While bells were used for such purposes on Mississippi River steamboats, this was departure from the tradition of Willamette River steamboats, which generally employed the steam whistle in lieu of a ship's bell.

On the Saturday morning before December 4, 1869, a steward on Alert, a young man named Foote, committed suicide by jumping overboard and drowning. Foote entered the ladies cabin, and as he went out, spoke to some women, telling them goodbye, and then immediately went to the stern of the boat and jumped over. Foote was reported to have been recently discharged from the East Portland Insane Asylum.

== Reconstruction and disposition ==
Sources appear to differ on the disposition of the steamer Alert. According to one source, Alert was condemned in 1871. Alert was rebuilt and renamed E.N. Cooke. Another (non-contemporaneous) source states that Alert was rebuilt in 1871 as the steamer E.N. Cooke, U.S. merchant vessel registry number 8762. Another source states that by June 1871, Alert had been broken up, with the machinery to be installed in a new boat.

=== Reconstruction ===
The steamer appears to have been rebuilt in 1871. In late March of that year, the People's Transportation Company was reported to be planning to build two new boats, one to replace Alert and another to replace Reliance. The new boats were to be 150 ft (45.7 m) long, of 250 tons, designed after a model by Capt. Joseph Kellogg.

In April 1871, "work had been commenced on the new steamer Alert", which was expected to be the largest and best-furnished steamer ever to run between Oregon City and Portland. On June 2, 1871, the new Alert was reported to be almost ready to be launched. On Monday, June 12, 1871, the old Alert was taken out of service, to be dismantled so that the machinery could be placed in the new Alert. The new Alert was reported to be in operation on Tuesday, August 22, 1871, carrying as cargo a large boiler from a repair shop in Portland to the woolen mills in Oregon City.

=== Disposition ===
Alert (#1233) and E.N. Cooke (#8762) were both listed separately on the 1874 merchant vessel registry. This continued to be the case three years later. By the next year, only E.N. Cooke was listed. Alert is recorded as having been dismantled in 1875.
