= Active (sternwheeler) =

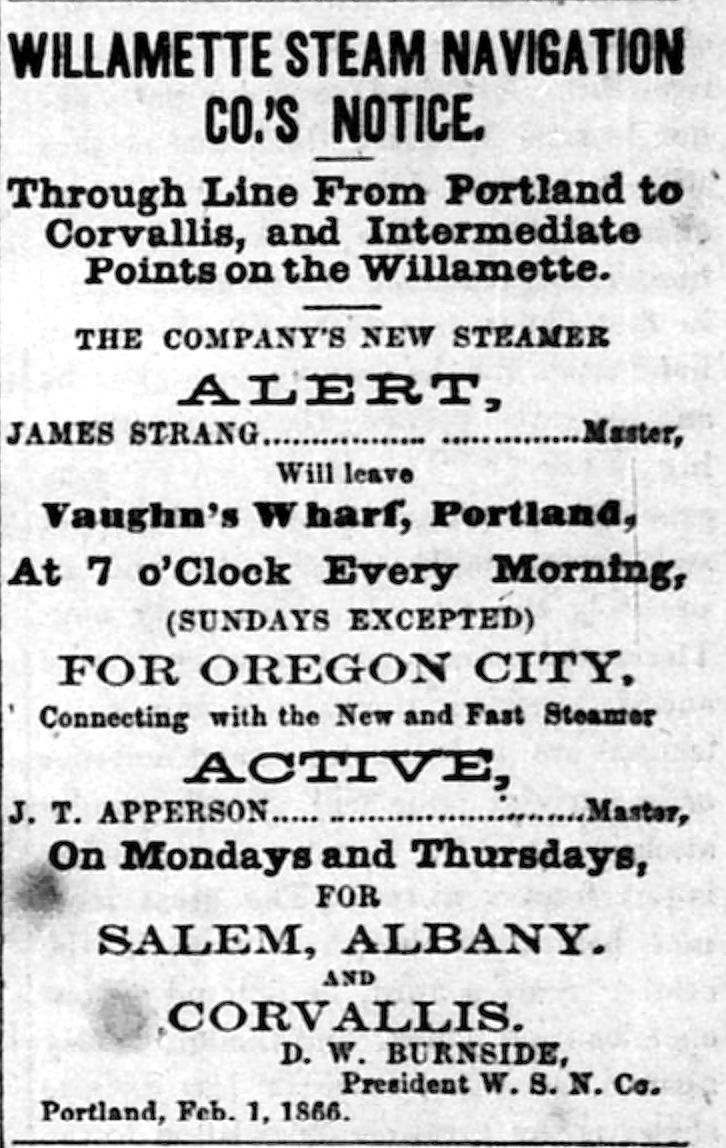
- Advertisement for Active and other steamers, placed March 17, 1866

History
- Owner: (1) Willamette Steam Navigation Co.; (2) People's Transportation Co.; (3) Oregon Steamship Co. (Ben Holladay)
- Route: Willamette River
- In service: 1865
- Out of service: 1872
- Identification: U.S. # 1232
- Fate: Dismantled at Canemah, OR

General characteristics
- Class & type: riverine all-purpose
- Tonnage: 259.74 gross tons
- Length: 122 ft (37.2 m) over hull (exclusive of fantail)
- Beam: 23 ft (7.0 m) over hull (exclusive of guards
- Depth: 5.1 ft (1.55 m)
- Installed power: twin steam engines, horizontally mounted, each with bore of 14 in (36 cm) and stroke of 4.5 ft (1.4 m), 13 nominal horsepower
- Propulsion: stern-wheel

Active was a stern-wheel driven steamboat that operated on the upper Willamette River from 1865 to 1872. During its short operational life, Active was owned by several different steamboat companies. It was dismantled in 1872 at Canemah, Oregon.

== Construction ==
Active was built at Canemah, Oregon for the Willamette Steam Navigation Company.

== Dimensions ==
Active was 122 ft (37.2 m) long, measured over the hull, and exclusive of the extension of the main deck over the stern, called the "fantail", on which the stern-wheel was mounted. Active had a beam of 23 ft (7.0 m) exclusive of the protective timbers along the upper sides of the hull called the guards. The depth of hold was 5.1 ft (1.55 m).

The overall size of the steamer was 269.74 gross tons, which was a measure of volume, not weight. The official merchant vessel registry number was 1232.

== Engineering ==
Active was driven by a stern-wheel, turned by twin steam engines, horizontally mounted, each with bore of 14 in (36 cm) and stroke of 4.5 ft (1.4 m), generating 13 nominal horsepower.

== Operations ==
Upon completion, Active was commanded by John T. Apperson, who was also a stockholder in the steamer's first owner, the Willamette Steam Navigation Company.

=== Competition with the People's Transportation Company ===
The W.S.N. company had been formed to give competition to the dominant steamer company on the river, the People's Transportation Company. The P.T. Company, as it was known, had bested a number of rivals, but the challenge of the W.S.N. Co., in October 1865, was one of the most serious it had faced.

The W.S.N. built Active at Canemah as well as the steamer Alert at Oswego, to make the run from Portland to Oregon City. The new company gained control of the upper Willamette steamer Echo, running both Active and Echo on the upper Willamette against the P.T. Company.

Fares dropped fast, so that a passenger could go from Portland to Oregon City for free, then on to Salem fifty cents, with meals and berth free, and then on to Albany for one dollar and to Corvallis for $1.50. Freight rates dropped to fifty cents per ton for shipments from Portland to Oregon City.

The steamboats of the rival companies tested their speed against each other on a daily basis. On one occasion, Active and the Reliance, a P.T. Company boat, raced all the way from Canemah to Salem. The speed contests between Reliance and Active were remembered many years later by one old steamboat man as the "most exciting boat racing I have ever seen."

=== Merger of the rival lines ===
By March 1866, the competition had grown too much for both companies, and they decided to merge. In 1866, when Willamette Steam Navigation Company sold all of its assets, including the steamer Active to the People's Transportation Company, Capt. George Jerome took over, followed a few years later by Capt. George A. Pease.

=== Sale to Holladay interests ===
On September 6, 1871, the People's Transportation Company, apprehensive that the pending completion of the locks at Oregon City would bring a new challenge to its near-ten-year monopoly, voted to dissolve the corporation and sell all its assets, including the steamer Active, to Ben Holladay's company, the Oregon and California Railroad, for $200,000.

== Disposition ==
Active was dismantled in 1872 at Canemah, Oregon.
