= Parents of Murdered Children Memorial =

Monument in Oregon City, Oregon, US

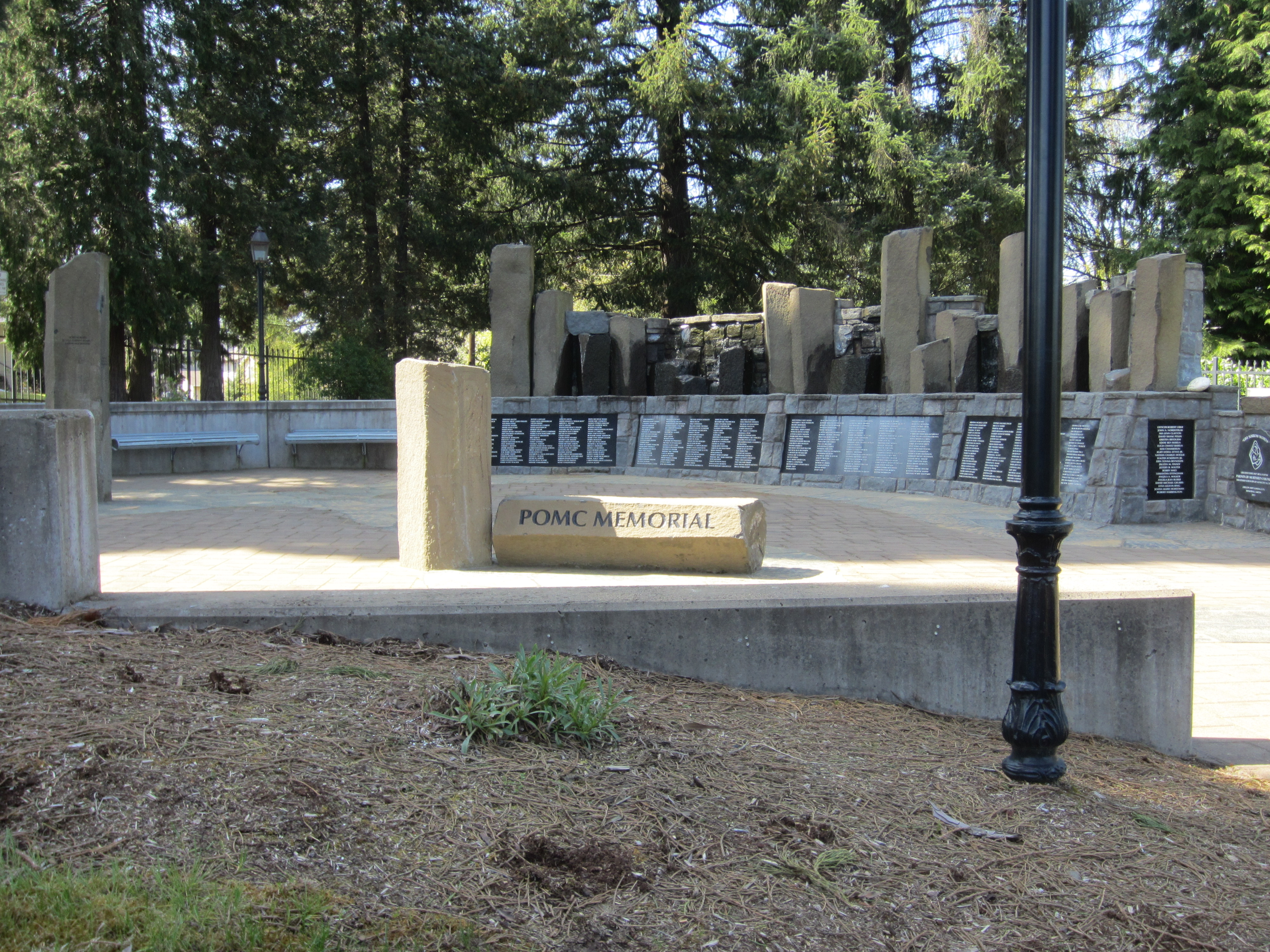
- The memorial in 2018
- Interactive map of Parents of Murdered Children Memorial
- Location: Oregon City, Oregon, U.S.
- Coordinates: 45.34354°N 122.59092°W
- Completion date: 2013
- Opening date: September 2013
- Dedicated to: child murder victims

The Parents of Murdered Children Memorial, sometimes abbreviated as the POMC Memorial, is a memorial to child murder victims, located at Mountain View Cemetery in Oregon City, Oregon, in the United States. The memorial was dedicated in September 2013, becoming the first of its kind in the Pacific Northwest and the eighth in the United States.

== Description ==
The memorial, located in the northwest corner of Mountain View Cemetery in Oregon City, has been described as a "beautiful place for anyone who has lost a loved one or child due to homicide". It features an Oregon/Washington Memorial Wall, a lighted curved wall that encompasses benches, freestanding basalt columns, a spiral-shaped stone walkway and a waterfall over more stonework. It cost $400,000 in cash and in-kind contributions. The memorial was the first of its kind in the Pacific Northwest and the eighth in the United States at the time of its September 2013 dedication.

== History ==
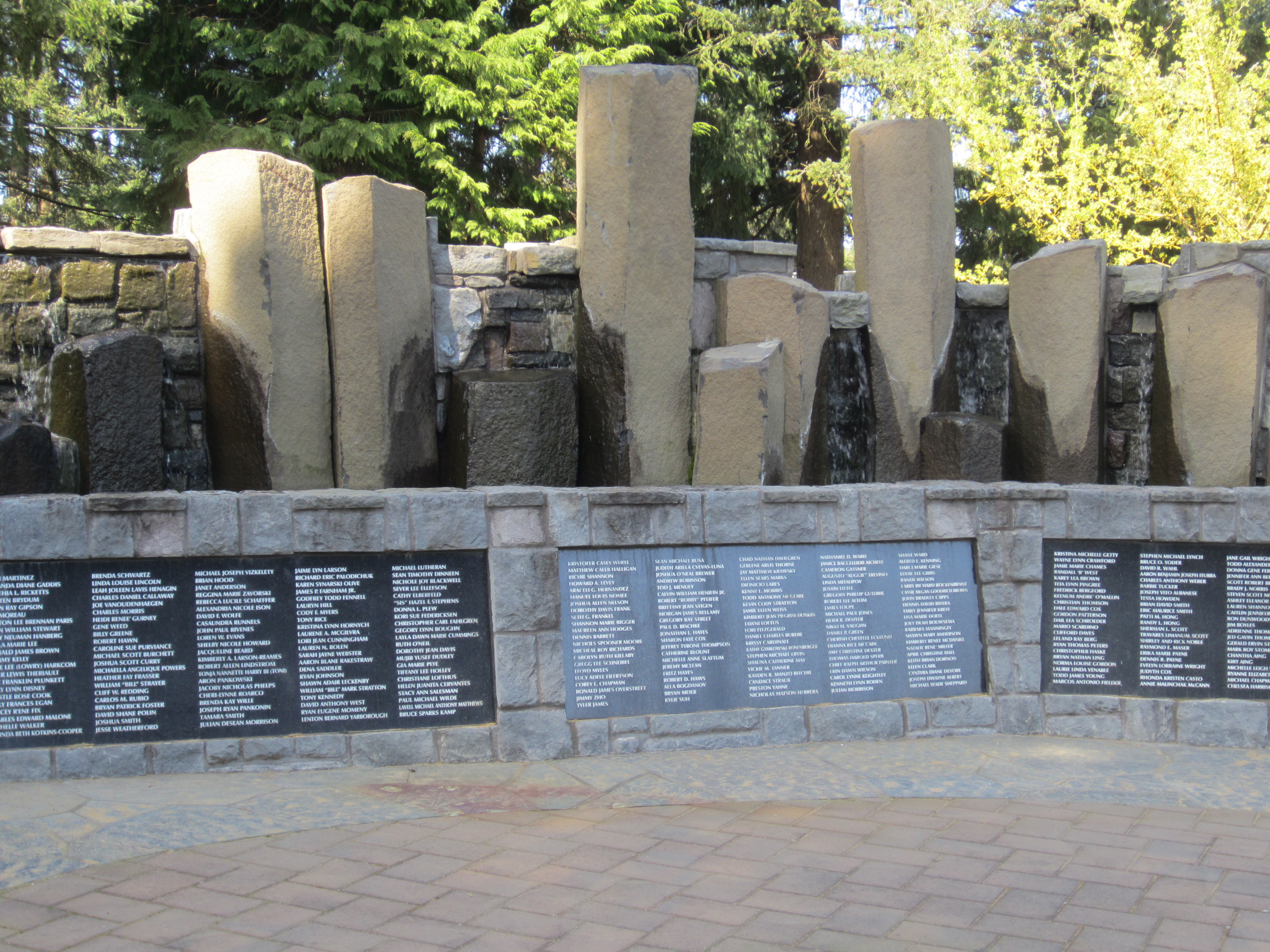
The memorial in 2018

Efforts to construct the memorial were led by Mary Elledge, leader of the Portland area chapter of Parents of Murdered Children (POMC), whose son Rob was murdered.
