= Echo (1865 sternwheeler) =

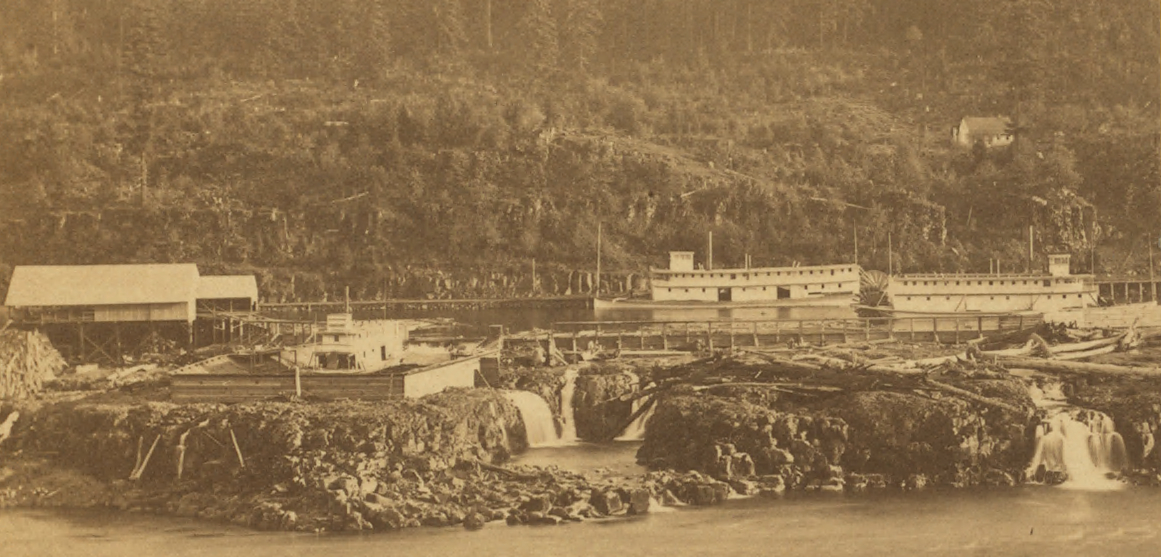
- Steamboats in boat basin at Oregon City circa 1865

History
- Name: Echo
- Owner: Willamette Steam Navigation Company and later others
- Route: Willamette River
- Launched: 1865
- Identification: US 8142
- Fate: Dismantled at Canemah, 1873

General characteristics
- Type: inland shallow-draft passenger/freighter
- Tonnage: 273 gross
- Length: 122 ft (37 m)
- Beam: 25 ft (7.6 m)
- Depth: 4 ft (1.2 m) depth of hold
- Installed power: twin steam engines, horizontally mounted, 10" bore by 36" stroke, 6 horsepower nominal
- Propulsion: sternwheel

Echo was a sternwheel steamboat that operated on the Willamette River from about 1865 to 1873 and was one of the first steamboats to carry what was then considered a large cargo out of Eugene, Oregon.

== Construction ==
Echo was built for the Willamette River Steam Navigation Company (WRSN) at Canemah, Oregon, a small town just above Willamette Falls which is now part of Oregon City. Echo's owners as shown on her licensing papers were A. P. Ankeny and John Gates. was launched May 22, 1865 and made her trial trip July 27 in command of Capt. Miles Bell, who was then in the service of the Willamette Steam Navigation Company. Captain Cochran succeeded Bell as master, and captains Pease and Sebastian Miller also handled the vessel for a while. Other sternwheelers built and run by WRSN included Alert and Active.

== Operations ==
Echo ran between Portland and Eugene, Oregon, a city which until 1853 bore the name "Skinner's Mudhole". By April 1869 Echo was running on the Willamette between Eugene and Springfield, carrying as much as 101 tons of freight, which up to then was the heaviest cargo ever embarked from Eugene. For a short time Echo, running above Willamette Falls, ran in conjunction with the steamer U.S. Grant, running below the falls.

== Ownership changes ==
In March 1866, WRSN and its boats were acquired by the People's Navigation Company, sometimes called the People's line. In 1871, People's line sold all its assets to Ben Holladay's Oregon Steamship Company.

== Disposition ==
Echo was dismantled at Canemah in 1873.

== See also ==
- Echo (sternwheeler 1901)
- Echo (steam tug)
