= Willamette Steam Navigation Company =

Defunct American steamship line

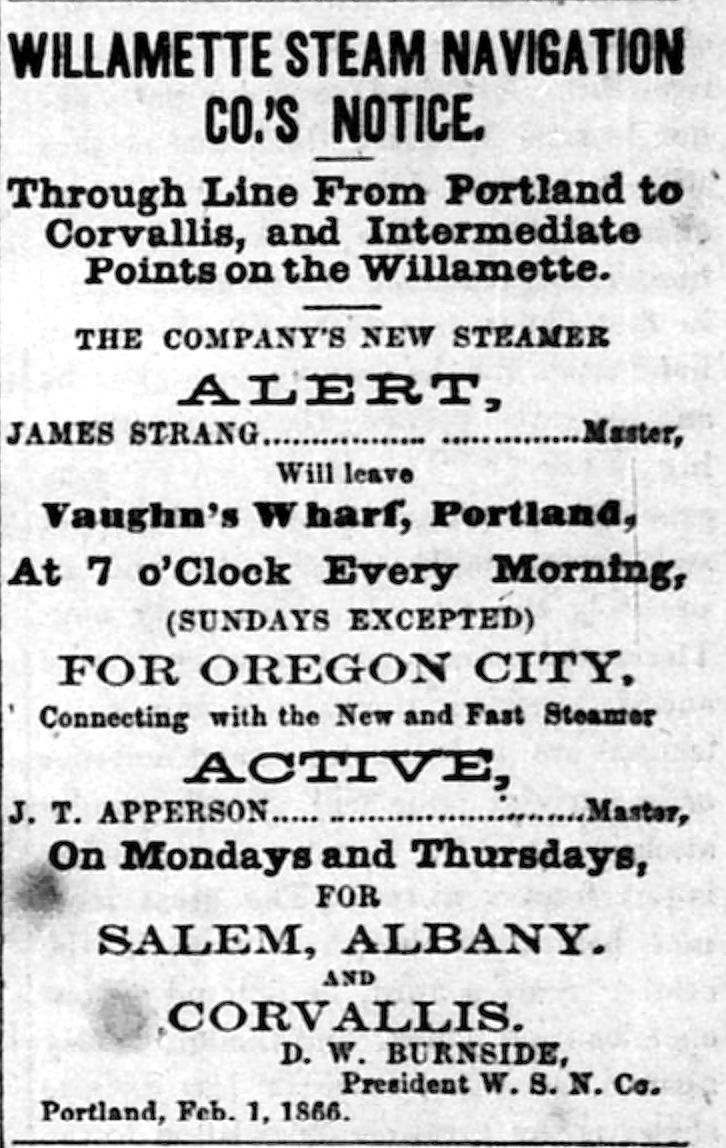
- Founded: 1865
- Defunct: 1867
- Fate: sold to People's Transportation Company
- Successor: People's Transportation Company
- Headquarters: Portland, Oregon

The Willamette Steam Navigation Company (W.S.N.) was an American company incorporated in October 1865 to challenge the monopoly on Willamette River inland steam navigation that the People's Transportation Company was attempting to establish.

== Overview ==
Officers of W.S.N. were D. W. Burnside, president, Portland co-founder Asa L. Lovejoy (1808-1882), vice-president, and John T. Apperson, secretary. Apperson also served as captain on one of their boats. The steamers Active and Alert were constructed, and they controlled the Echo and one or two others. Alert was put on the Portland to Oregon City run, and Active and Echo worked above Willamette Falls from Canemah (now Oregon City) to Corvallis.

Nicholas Haun (also seen spelled Hann and Hahn), was also reported to have been a president of the company.

Like previous challengers to the monopoly, the Willamette Steam Navigation Company soon sold out to the People's Transportation Company in March 1866.
