= James D. Miller =

American steamboat captain (1830–1914)

Captain James D. Miller
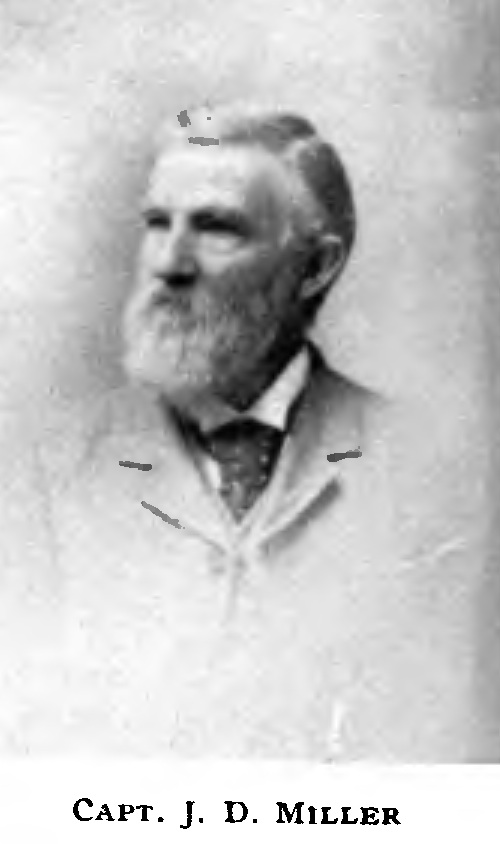
- Born: February 13, 1830; Salem County, New Jersey, US
- Died: July 24, 1914 (aged 84); Spokane, Washington, US
- Occupation: Steamboat captain
- Children: James D. Miller, possibly others

James D. Miller (1830–1914) was a steamboat captain in the Pacific Northwest from 1851 to 1903. He became well known for his long length of service, the large number of vessels he commanded, and the many different geographical areas in which he served.

== Migration to Oregon ==
Capt. James D. Miller arrived on the Pacific Coast in 1848. Arriving in Oregon Miller traded his horses and mules for an acre of land just north of Oregon City, Oregon at a place called Clackamas City.

== Flatboat navigation on the Willamette ==
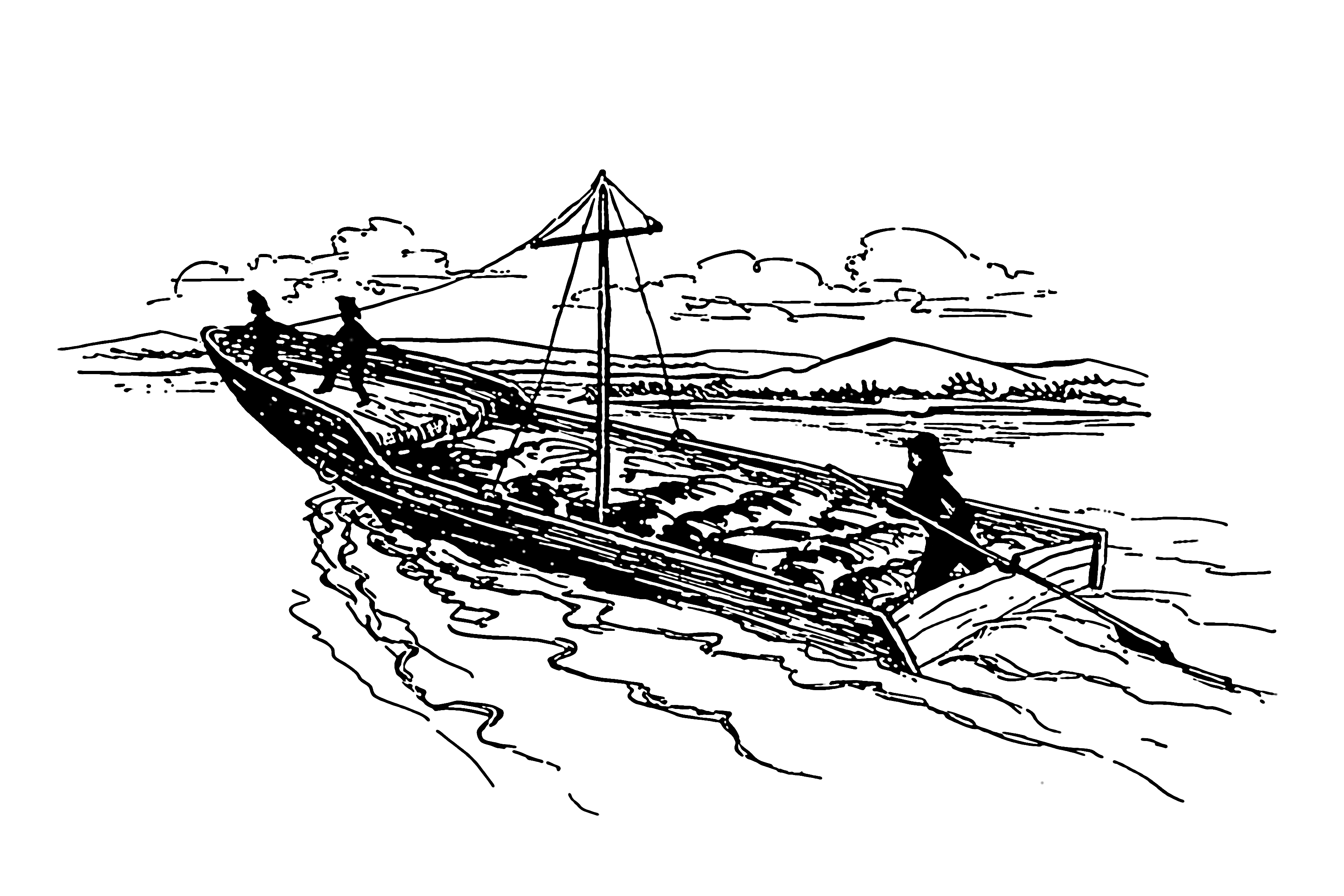
A typical flat boat, or bateau

In the spring of 1850, Miller began running a flatboat between Canemah just above Willamette Falls on the Willamette River and Dayton, on the Yamhill River. Miller built a flatboat 65 feet long, which was capable of hauling 350 bushels of wheat. He hired four members of the Klickitat First Nation as crew and poled and rowed the boat up the Yamhill River to Dayton and Lafayette. It took two days to go up from Canemah, and one day to return. Miller charged $35 a ton to haul cargo to upriver farmers, mostly consignments from merchants on the lower Willamette (the part of the river below Willamette Falls). Coming down river Miller charged 50 cents a bushel to carry out the farmers' wheat. His chief expenses were the salaries of his First Nations crew, which were $16 per man for each trip.

== Start in steamboating ==
Miller had been in the flatboat business for about a year when on May 19, 1851, the first steamboat appeared on the upper Willamette. This was the small sidewheeler Hoosier. Although small and crude, Hoosier was capable of hauling much more cargo and wheat than any flatboat. Miller was soon out of business, however he did manage to be hired by Hoosier's owner, John Zumwalt. On board Hoosier, Miller worked as the bookkeeper, purser, pilot, deckhand and roustabout. In the fall of 1856 with his brother-in-law Silas R. Smith, Miller bought Hoosier and the next year built another steamboat Hoosier No. 2 and operated the vessel on the Willamette between Champoeg and Butteville and up the Yamhill River. Later, they rebuilt Hoosier' No. 2 and called her Hoosier No. 3.

In 1858 Miller sold an interest in Hoosier No. 3 to E.M. White and with his associates purchased the sternwheeler James Clinton and ran her until April 23, 1861, when the Clinton was destroyed by a dockside fire at Linn City, Oregon. In 1860 he took the machinery out of Hoosier and placed it in the steam scow Yamhill.

== Snake River mines and purchase of the Unio/Union ==
Soon after this Miller sold his interest in Yamhill to Capt. John T. Apperson, and with Capt. George A. Pease went to the Snake River mines. Meanwhile Apperson had built the sternwheeler Unio whose unusual name derived from Captain Apperson's uncertainty about who might prevail in the American Civil War which had just begun, as well as a significant number of Confederate sympathizers who might be among his customers. Returning from there in December, 1861, Miller bought the Unio from Captain Apperson, and, not caring what his Southern-inclined customers might think, quickly added the final "n" to her name.

== House washed away by flood ==
Miller's home was destroyed, along with most of Linn City, in a flood of the Willamette River on December 1, 1861. Miller's home was thought to be the safest structure in the town, and other people sheltered there. But as the water rose, it became obvious they would have to evacuate the structure, which was done just before the building was swept away.

== Steamboat pilot on the Willamette ==
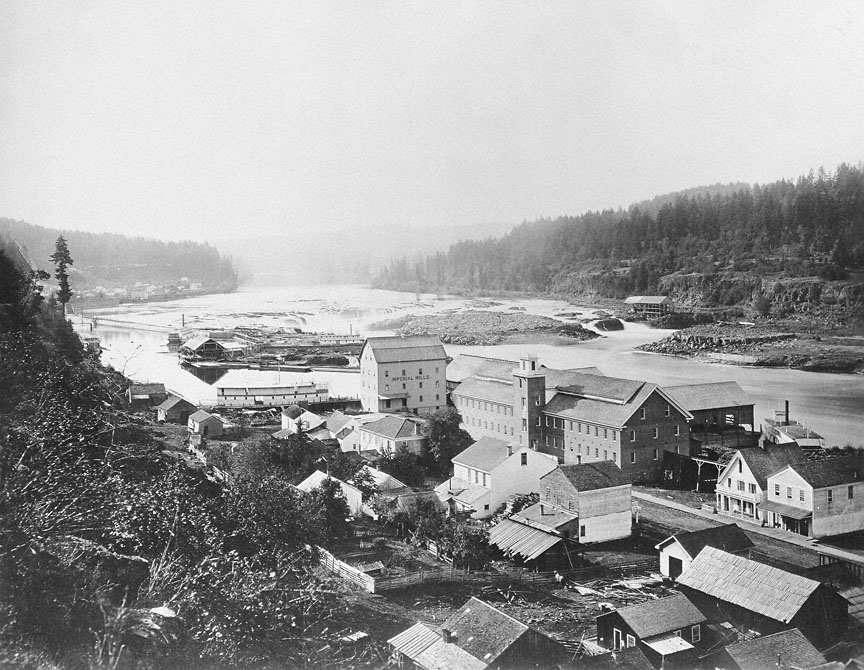
Oregon City, and Willamette Falls in 1867

Except for a short time in 1862, when he was on the Mountain Buck and Julia Barclay, Miller ran Union on the Willamette River until 1866 when the vessel was acquired by the People's Transportation Company. From the Union Miler went as pilot on the Fanny Patton with Capt. George Jerome. After that, Miller moved to the Enterprise (built 1863) with Capt. Sebastian "Bas" Miller, remaining with Enterprise until that vessel was dismantled.

In 1868 Miller piloted the new steamer Albany with Capt. Lon Vickers. After a short term on Albany Miller entered the milling business at Oregon City. Soon afterward he served on the People's Transportation Company's steamers Onward, Senator and E.N. Cooke Miller was a passenger on Senator when she was blown up in 1875 near the Alder Street dock in Portland, Oregon. The Miller next day took command of the E. N. Cooke, and ran her until the Oregon Steam Navigation Company absorbed the People's Transportation Company.

== Financial losses in the flour business ==
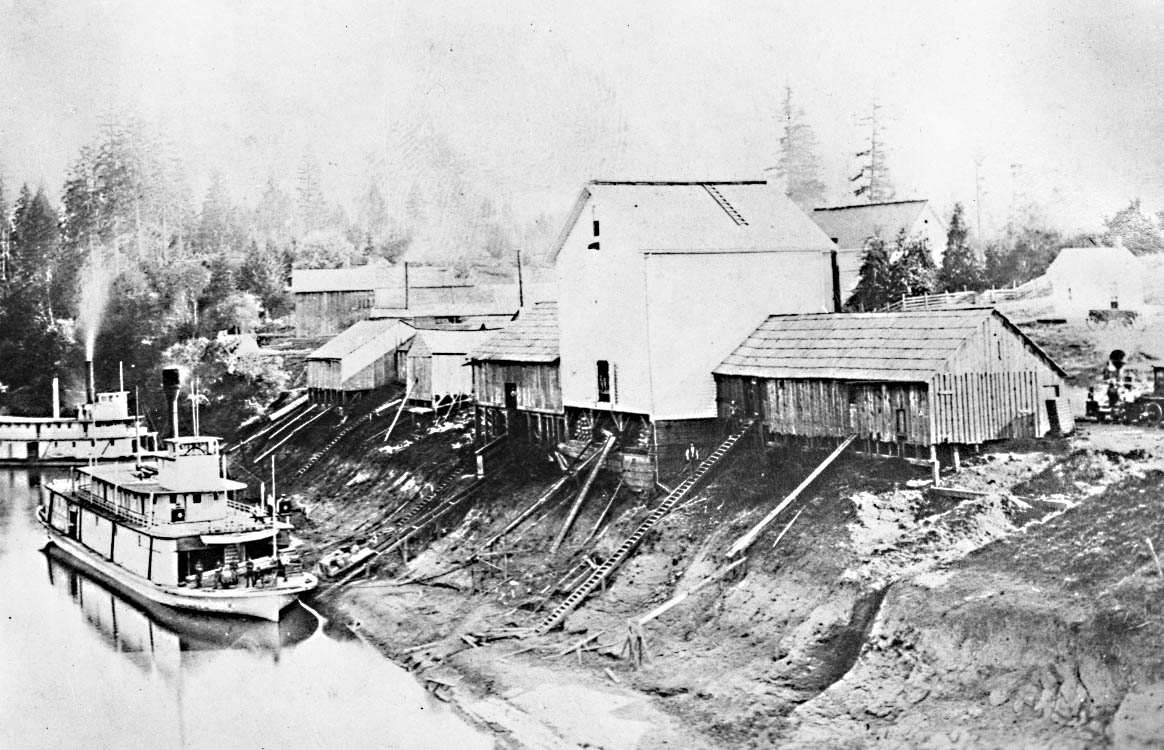
Steamer A.A. McCully, on the Yamhill River at Dayton, Oregon

In 1878 he purchased C. P. Church's interest in some flour mills, and also bought the steamer A.A. McCully. Miller removed the geared machinery from A.A. McCully and installed it in the steamer Success. Miller ran Success up the Willamette River to Eugene, Oregon. In 1879 Miller suffered some financial reverses, losing not only his mill interest but Success as well, which he had turned over to Z.J. Hatch. Miller then took command of the City of Salem, and ran her until 1881 for William Reid, carrying railroad material to Ray's Landing and Dayton, Oregon.

== Work in Idaho and eastern Washington ==
For health reasons Miller resigned from the command of City of Salem, and with Church and others bought the flour mills at Walla Walla, Wash. Terr. From there Miller went to Sand Point, Idaho and ran the Henry Villard on Lake Pend Oreille. From the Henry Villard he went to the Katie Hallett, running on the Clarks Fork Yellowstone River.

== Return to the Willamette Valley ==
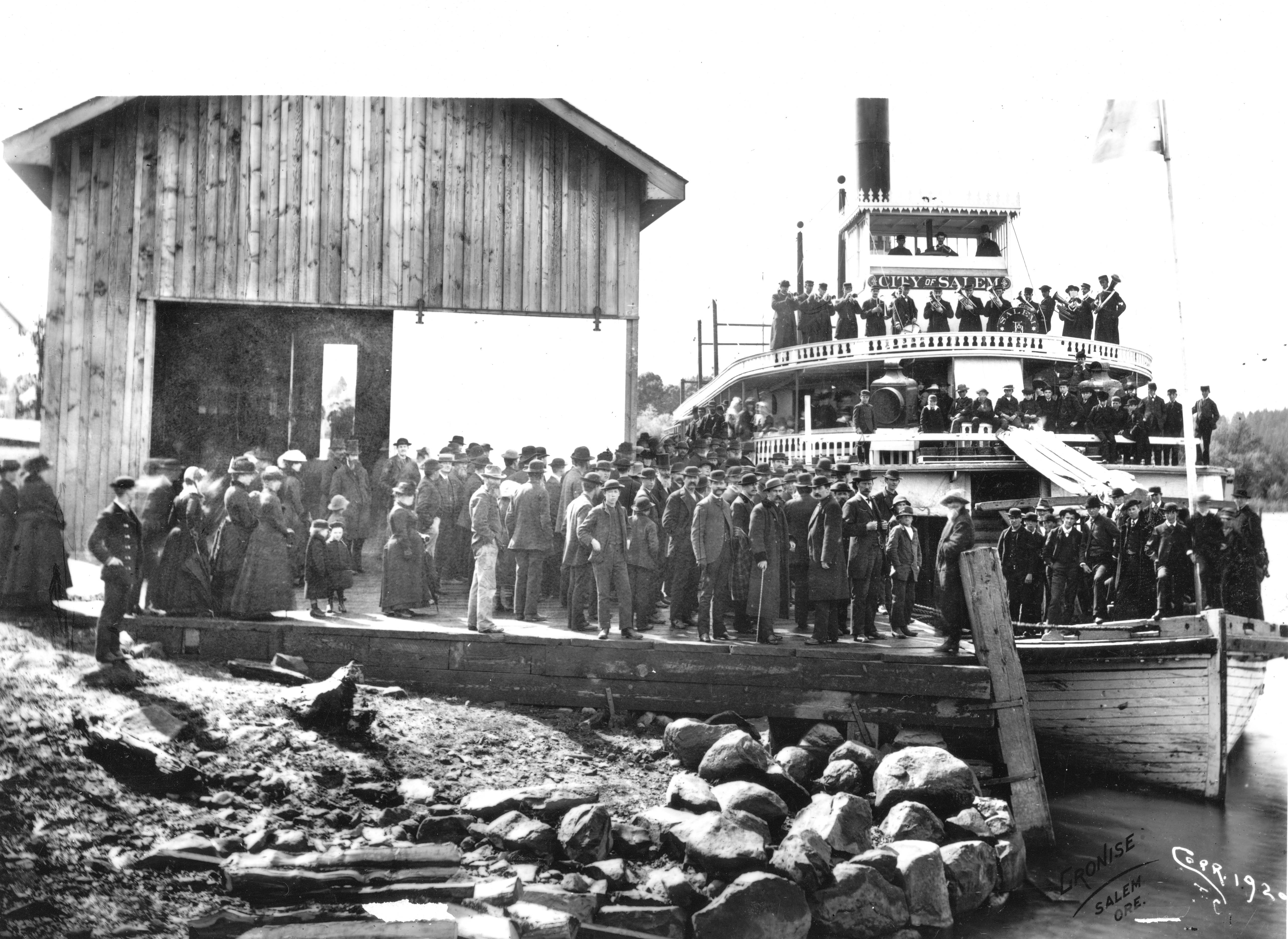
City of Salem sternwheeler on the Willamette River

In the spring of 1882 Miller returned to Walla Walla, sold out the mill and went to Dayton, Oregon. In 1886, he retired to a farm, returning to the river again in 1889, again running the City of Salem, this time between Fulquartz and Ray's landings until 1890.

== Construction of sternwheeler Norma in Idaho ==
Miller then went to Huntington, Oregon and superintended the building of the Norma, making the first trip with her into the Seven Devils' Country. This was a run 60 miles downriver into Hells Canyon to Seven Devils Landing, and then back upriver to Huntington. Returning to Portland he served on the Governor Newell, Three Sisters, Toledo and Joseph Kellogg during 1891–92.

== Relocation to the Kootenay region ==
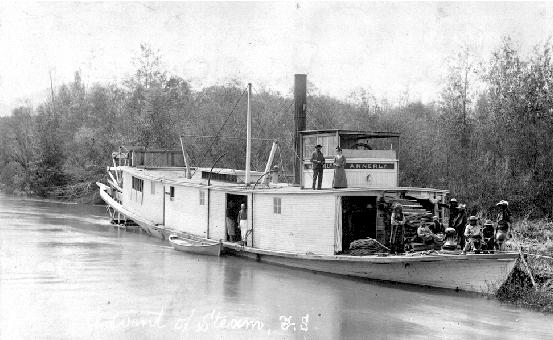
Annerly, first steamboat on the Upper Kootenay River

In 1893, Miller went to Montana and took command of the steamer Annerly, running on the upper Kootenay River between Jennings, Montana and Fort Steele, BC.. He remained there until August 1894, when he went to Puget Sound, purchased the steamer Halys, and had her shipped inland to be placed on the lower Kootenai River, running out of Bonner's Ferry, Idaho. Miller commanded steamboats in the Kootanay region until 1901.

== Destruction of the Gwendoline ==
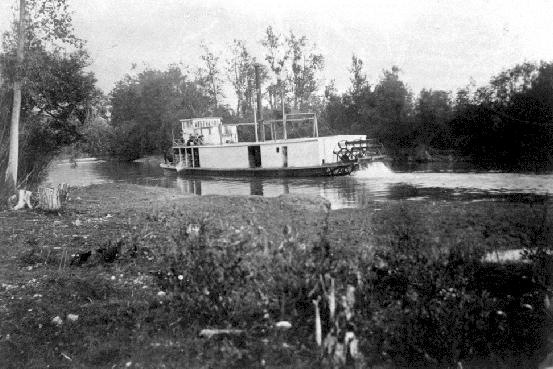
Gwendoline

Completion of the British Columbia Southern Railway in October 1898 had the effect of idling the three major steamboats on the upper Kootenay River, all of which Miller had commanded at various times: J.D. Farrell, North Star, and Gwendoline. Miller had the idea of moving Gwendoline by rail to the Lardeau River and Kootenay Lake which appeared to be a route where she could generate revenue. (The Kootenay River, which ultimately flowed into Kootenay Lake, was unnavigable below Jennings because of Kootenay Falls. Miller paid $500 in shipping fees and arranged to have Gwendoline loaded on three flat cars. The rail line tracked along the canyon face, and at one point there appeared to be not enough room for the steamer to squeeze past. The rail crew shifted the steamer over away from the cliff face and a bit closer to the canyon rim. Unfortunately the steamer was shifted too far, and tipped over off the flat cars and tumbled down into the canyon, landing bottom up, a total loss.

== Steamboat operations out of Wenatchee ==
In 1902 to 1903, Miller commanded steamboats on the reach of the Columbia River above Wenatchee, Washington.

== Death and legacy ==
Captain Miller died in Spokane, Washington on July 24, 1914.

Probably no other person had a longer career in the steamboat business in the Pacific Northwest. Over the course of his career, Miller commanded 36 steamboats, on the Tualatin, Willamette, Columbia and Kootenay rivers, among which were the vessels already named as well as Elwood, Multnomah, Undine, and Chelan. Captain Miller's son, James D. Miller, was also a steamboat pilot.
