= Hoosier (1851 sidewheeler) =

The Hoosier was the first steamboat to operate above Willamette Falls on the Willamette River in Oregon. It was built by John Kruse, and owned by John Zumwalt. James D. Miller worked on this boat and in 1856 became its owner.
