= Unio (sternwheeler) =

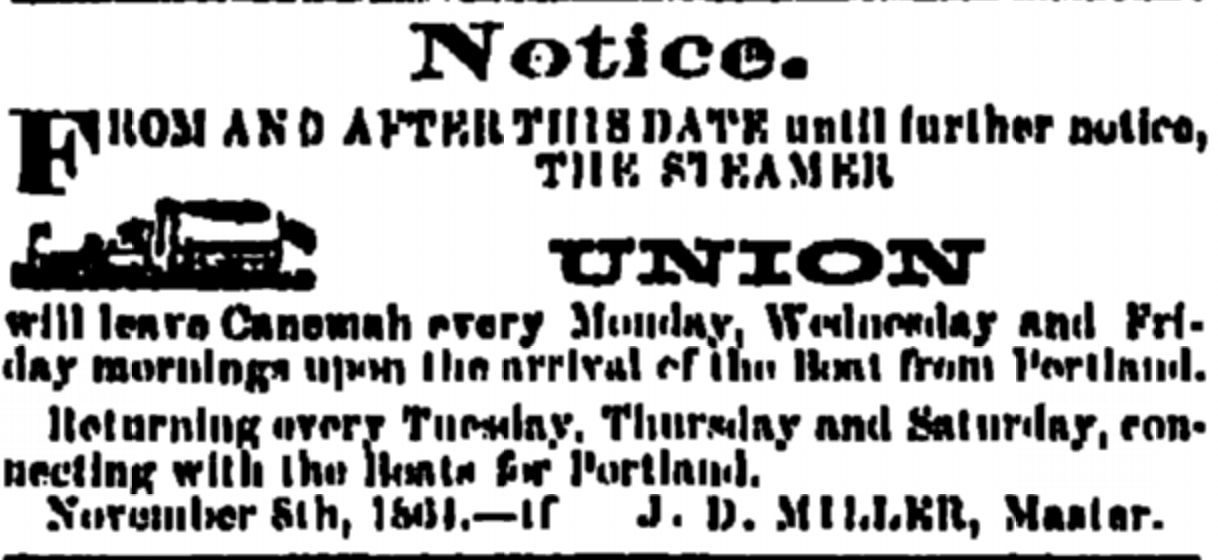
- Advertisement for steamer Union ex Unio, February 22, 1865

History
- Name: Unio, later, Union
- Owner: John T. Apperson, James D. Miller, People’s Transportation Co.
- Route: Willamette and Yamhill rivers
- Builder: J.T. Apperson
- Launched: October 1865, at Canemah, OR
- In service: 1861
- Out of service: 1869
- Identification: U.S. 25165
- Fate: Sunk on Yamhill River near Lafayette, OR, salvaged, dismantled.
- Notes: Boiler and engines to a new steamer built for Umpqua River service.

General characteristics
- Type: inland steamship
- Tonnage: 111.59
- Length: 96 ft (29.3 m), and after reconstruction, 191 ft (58.2 m)
- Beam: 16 ft (4.9 m)
- Draft: about 4 ft (1 m) when loaded
- Decks: three (freight, passenger, boat)
- Installed power: twin steam engines, single cylinder, 9-inch bore, 48-inch stroke
- Propulsion: sternwheel

Unio was a small sternwheel-driven steamboat which operated on the Willamette and Yamhill rivers from 1861 to 1869. This vessel is primarily remembered for its having been named Unio when built in 1861, in the first year of the American Civil War, and then having the name completed, to Union, by a new, staunchly pro-Union owner, James D. Miller. Union appears to have sunk in 1869, been salvaged, and then dismantled, with the machinery going to a new steamer then being built for service on the Umpqua River.

== Construction ==
The steamer Unio was built at Canemah, Oregon by Capt. John T. Apperson, and launched on October 19, 1861. With the American Civil War in progress, Apperson left off the final “n” on the name. Unio was placed on the Yamhill River route from Oregon City.

Unio was small, with dimensions reported to have been 96 feet long, probably exclusive of the fantail, and 16 foot beam (width). The boat drew about 4 feet of water when loaded. The steamer was driven by two engines, each with a 9-inch bore and a 48-inch stroke. Unio was measured at 111.59 tons for the United States merchant vessel registry. The official merchant vessel registry number was 25165.

Upon launch, Unio was reported to be capable of running up the Willamette River to Salem and further in low water, and a prosperous business was anticipated for the steamer, should the state fair be held in Salem the next year.

== Regular service ==
Unio was expected to make its first trip from Canemah to Lafayette on Saturday, November 23, 1861.

By early December 1861, Unio was making regular trips from Canemah to Lafayette, under Captain Apperson.

Capt. James D. Miller bought Unio from Captain Apperson in December 1861, after he had returned from work on mines along the Snake River. It was Miller who added the final “n” and thereafter the vessel became known as the Union. The name change occurred prior to April 22, 1862, when Miller was reported to be the captain of the boat, and Apperson the clerk.

On Friday, October 3, 1862, Union was the first boat of the season to arrive at Salem, coming down river from Oregon City. The steamer returned the next morning with passengers bound for the Oregon State Fair.

Except for a short time in 1862, when he served as commander on the Mountain Buck and the Julia, Captain Miller operated the Union until 1865 when he sold it to the Willamette Steam Navigation Company, of which J.T. Apperson was the secretary. The next year the boat was sold to the People's Transportation Company.

In December 1866, Union was owned by the People's Transportation Company, of which Asa Alfred McCully (1818–1886) was president. Under the winter shipping arrangements of the company, the steamer Alert departed Portland daily at 7:00 a.m., for Oregon City, where it connected with steamers running to points on the upper Willamette River, upstream from Willamette Falls. The Reliance ran on Mondays and Thursdays to Corvallis, Oregon; the Fannie Patton ran to the same city on Tuesdays and Fridays; the Active ran every Wednesday for Harrisburg, Lancaster, and Eugene; and Union ran on Mondays, Wednesdays and Fridays for Dayton and Lafayette on the Yamhill River.

In 1867 and 1868, Captain George Jerome was in charge of Union.

In June 1868, officers of Union included Capt. J.T. Apperson, engineer Edward Fellows, and steward Allen.

== Disposition ==
On Tuesday, January 19, 1869, Union was sunk in the Lafayette rapid on the Dayton River. Initial reports of the sinking could provide no information as to the extent of any damage to the boat. In late September 1869, Josiah B. Leed (1829–1889) doing business as J.B. Leeds & Company bought the boiler and engines of the Union to be installed on a steamer, later to be named Swan, being built for use on the Umpqua River.

Nicholas Haun (also seen spelled Hann, Hahn, and Horn), formerly of the Willamette Steam Navigation Company, was an owner of the new steamer. Swan, a similar sized sternwheeler, was built by Hiram Doncaster (b.1838) across the Umpqua river from Gardiner, Oregon. With Haun in command, Swan became the first and only steamboat to reach Roseburg, Oregon on the Umpqua river, a journey of 100 miles which took 11 days.
