= Annerly =

Steamboat

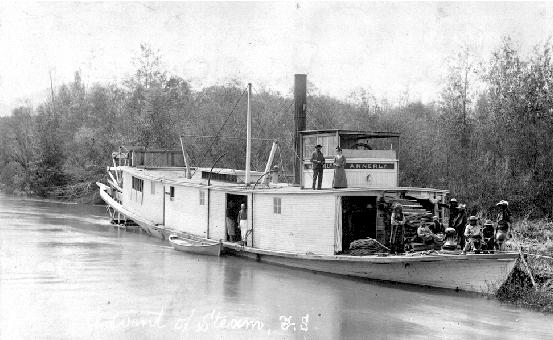
- Annerly The crewmen on the foredeck appear to be members of local Indian tribes, who commonly served as crew of steamboats in the Kootenay region.

History

Canada
- Name: Annerly (US #106963)
- Owner: Depuy & Jones
- Route: Kootenay River in Montana and British Columbia
- Launched: 1892, at Jennings, Montana
- Fate: Dismantled 1896

General characteristics
- Type: Inland passenger/freighter
- Tonnage: 128 gross tons; 79.5 registered tons
- Length: 92.5 ft (28 m)
- Beam: 16 ft (5 m)
- Depth: 4.4 ft (1 m) depth of hold
- Installed power: twin steam engines, horizontally mounted
- Propulsion: sternwheel

Annerly was a sternwheel steamboat that operated on the upper Kootenay River in British Columbia and northwestern Montana from 1892 to 1896.

== Design and construction ==
Annerly was built in 1892 at Jennings, Montana on the Kootenay River for the partnership of Dupuy & Jones. Annerly was a small steam vessel with scant accommodations.

== Operations on Kootenay River ==
Annerly was the first American steamer to run on the upper Kootenay river. Annerly first arrived at Fort Steele, BC, then the principal settlement in the region, in May, 1893.

During the navigation seasons (generally fall and spring) of 1893 through 1895, Annerly was operated from Jennings, Montana north up the Kootenay River across the international border into British Columbia to a point on the river known as North Star Landing, upriver from Fort Steele. Annerly loaded ore at North Star landing and then transported the ore south to Jennings to connect with the Great Northern Railway. Annerly's commanders included Capt. James D. Miller (1830–1914) and Capt. Irvin B. Sandborn.

== Rescue mission in Jennings Canyon ==
Operations on the Kootenay river were made hazardous by the Jennings Canyon. Of the six sternwheelers that were employed on the upper Kootenay River, only Annerly was not wrecked or seriously damaged in the canyon. Steamers sometimes ran in pairs through the canyon. On July 12, 1896, Annerly under Captain Sandborn, was running Jennings Canyon ahead of Rustler. Rustler hit a rock which made a hole in the hull near the boiler. Captain Sandborn's wife noticed something wrong with Rustler and called out to her husband. Sandborn then turned Annerly around and went back up the canyon. He arrived in time to take off all 19 of Rustler's passengers and crew just before Rustler was washed off the rock and rolled over.

== Dismantled ==
Annerly was dismantled in 1896.
