= Lancaster, Oregon =

Unincorporated community in the state of Oregon, United States

- Unincorporated community
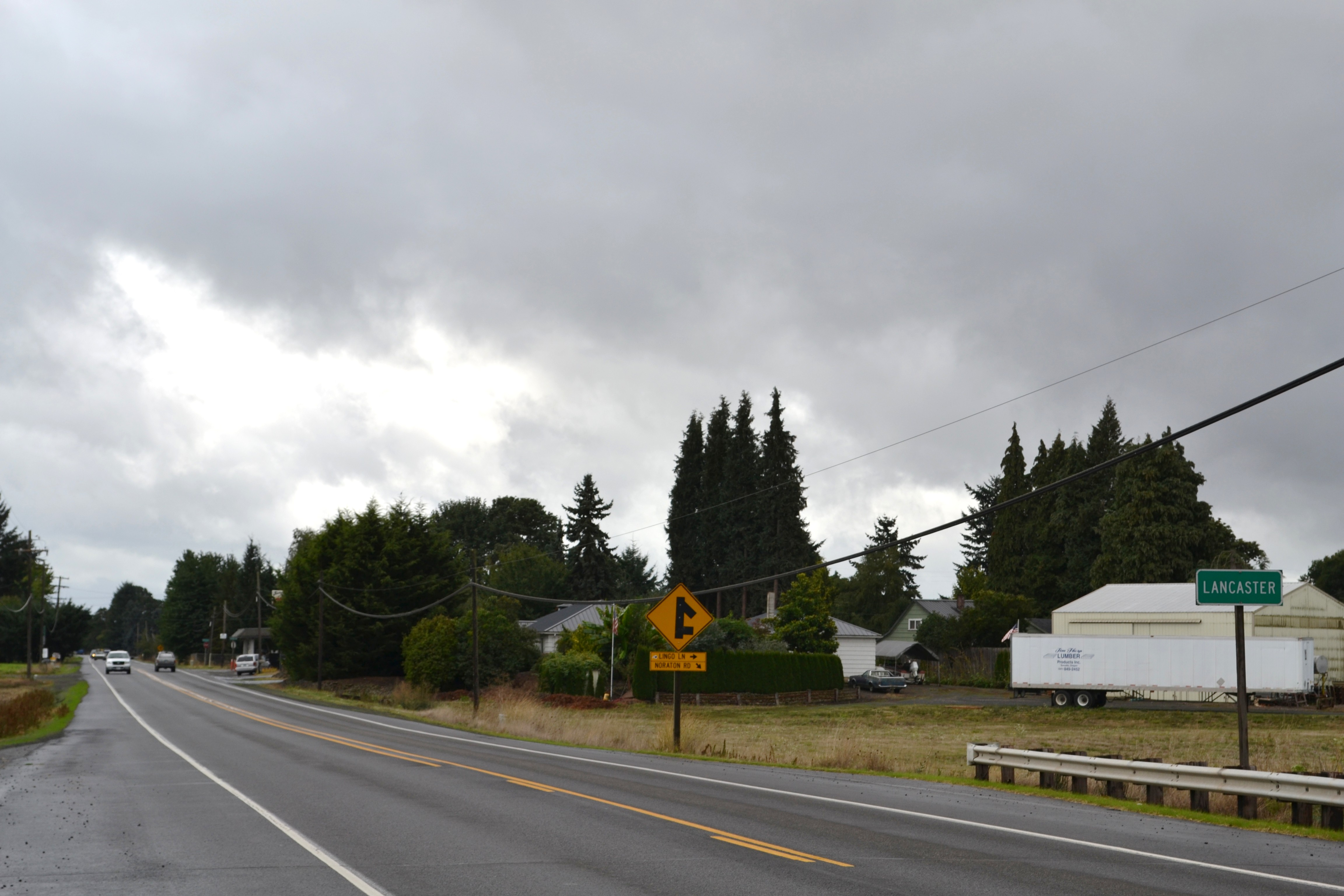

- Location within Oregon Location within the United States
- Coordinates: 44°15′10″N 123°11′44″W
- Country: United States
- State: Oregon
- County: Lane
- Elevation: 315 ft (96 m)
- Time zone: UTC-8 (Pacific (PST))
  - Summer (DST): UTC-7 (PDT)
- GNIS feature ID: 1122931

Lancaster is an unincorporated community in Lane County, Oregon, United States. It is located about two miles south of Harrisburg and two miles north of Junction City, on Oregon Route 99E near the Willamette River.

== History ==
The first post office in the area was named Freedom, established in 1858. The name was changed to Lancaster in 1866 and to Junction City in 1872. It is likely the office was moved south two miles after the last renaming.

About 1852 or 1853, a man named Woody started a "house of entertainment" (aka a roadhouse) at this locale, which he named "Woodyville". It was also known as Woody's Landing. The property was bought by Johnson Mulkey, who built a sawmill at the site and changed the name to Lancaster. The sawmill was still operating in 1861 and likely longer. Two stores operated at the site, which was chosen for its proximity to the southernmost navigable point on the river and a prosperous agricultural district, with hopes of the place becoming a viable town. The Great Flood of 1862 changed the course of the river, leaving the town too far from the main channel, however, and the Oregon and California Railroad bypassed Lancaster, so Junction City became the more important community.

== See also ==
- Steamboats of the Willamette River
