= Mountain View Cemetery (Oregon City, Oregon) =

Cemetery in Clackamas County, Oregon

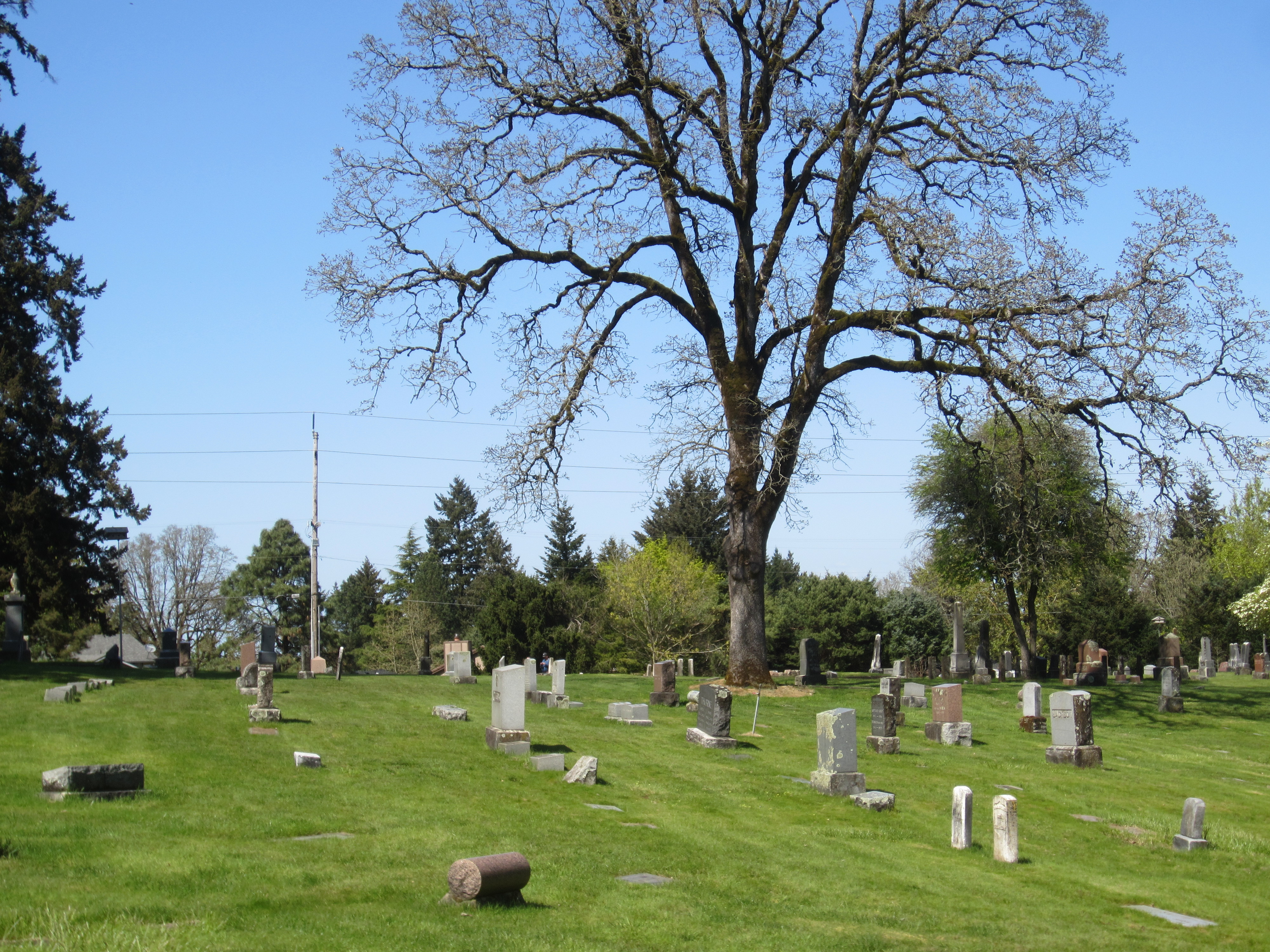
- Part of the cemetery in 2018

Details
- Location: Oregon City, Oregon
- Country: United States
- Coordinates: 45°20′32″N 122°35′24″W
- Website: https://www.orcity.org/cemetery
- Find a Grave: Mountain View Cemetery

Mountain View Cemetery is a pioneer cemetery in Oregon City, Oregon, United States. It is located above Newell Creek Canyon, with views of Mount Hood to the east.

The cemetery features the Parents of Murdered Children Memorial.
