= John T. Apperson =

American politician (1834–1917)

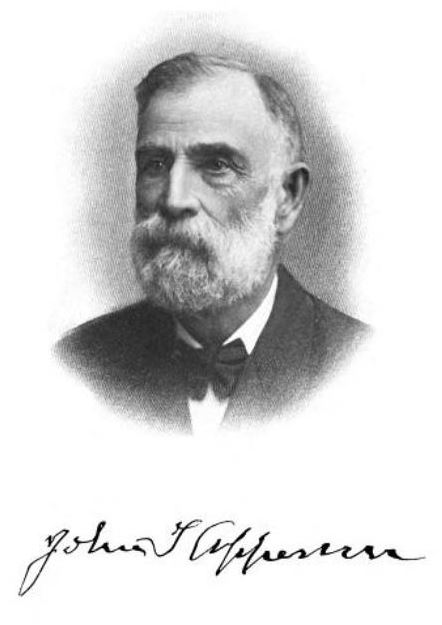

Member of the Oregon Senate from the 3rd and 4th district
- In office 1878–1881
- Preceded by: John Myers
- Succeeded by: John Myers
- Constituency: Clackamas County

Member of the Oregon House of Representatives from the 4th district
- In office 1870–1871 and 1889–1890

Personal details
- Born: December 23, 1834 Christian County, Kentucky
- Died: April 3, 1917 (aged 82) Oregon City, Oregon
- Resting place: Mountain View Cemetery, Oregon City, Oregon
- Party: Republican
- Profession: Steamboat owner and captain

John T. Apperson (December 23, 1834 – April 3, 1917) was an American steamboat captain and military officer who also served in the Oregon Legislative Assembly. He was born in Christian County, Kentucky, son of Beverly Apperson and Jane Gilbert Tubbs. He was a steamboat captain and owner on the Willamette River in the 1850s. He served as a first lieutenant in Company "E" of the Oregon Cavalry during the American Civil War.

He was the sheriff of Clackamas County. He served in the Oregon House of Representatives in 1870 and in the Oregon State Senate from 1878 to 1881, but was defeated when he ran for reelection in 1882. In 1889, he served again in the Oregon House of Representatives, after being elected to a seat in 1888.

== Steamboat owner ==
In 1861, Apperson built the steamboat Unio on the Willamette River at Canemah, Oregon and operated it from its launching in October 1861 to December of the same year, when Apperson sold the boat to another steamboat captain, James D. Miller. Despite having sold Unio to Miller, Apperson as of April 1862, held a position on the boat as clerk.

== Death ==
Apperson died on April 3, 1917, at his home in the Park Place neighborhood of Oregon City, where he had resided with his wife, Mary Ann Elliott Apperson. He is buried at the Mountain View Cemetery in Oregon City.
